= History of social democracy =

Social democracy originated as an ideology within the labour movement whose goals have been a social revolution to promote socialism within democratic processes. In a nonviolent revolution as in the case of evolutionary socialism, or the establishment and support of a welfare state. Its origins lie in the 1860s as a revolutionary socialism associated with orthodox Marxism. Starting in the 1890s, there was a dispute between committed revolutionary social democrats such as Rosa Luxemburg and reformist social democrats. The latter sided with Marxist revisionists such as Eduard Bernstein, who supported a more gradual approach grounded in liberal democracy and cross-class cooperation. Karl Kautsky represented a centrist position. By the 1920s, social democracy became the dominant political tendency, along with communism, within the international socialist movement, representing a form of democratic socialism with the aim of achieving socialism peacefully. By the 1910s, social democracy had spread worldwide and transitioned towards advocating an evolutionary change from capitalism to socialism using established political processes such as the parliament. In the late 1910s, socialist parties committed to revolutionary socialism renamed themselves as communist parties, causing a split in the socialist movement between these supporting the October Revolution and those opposing it. Social democrats who were opposed to the Bolsheviks later renamed themselves as democratic socialists in order to highlight their differences from communists and later in the 1920s from Marxist–Leninists, disagreeing with the latter on topics such as their opposition to liberal democracy whilst sharing common ideological roots.

In the early post-war era, social democrats in Western Europe rejected the Stalinist political and economic model, which was then current in the Soviet Union. They committed themselves either to an alternative path to socialism or to a compromise between capitalism and socialism. During the post-war period, social democrats embraced the idea of a mixed economy based on the predominance of private property, with only a minority of essential utilities and public services being under public ownership. As a policy regime, social democracy became associated with Keynesian economics, state interventionism and the welfare state as a way to avoid capitalism's typical crises and to avert or prevent mass unemployment, without abolishing factor markets, private property and wage labour. With the rise in popularity of neoliberalism and the New Right by the 1980s, many social democratic parties incorporated the Third Way ideology, aiming to fuse economic liberalism with social democratic welfare policies. By the 2010s, social democratic parties that accepted triangulation and the neoliberal shift in policies such as austerity, deregulation, free trade, privatization and welfare reforms such as workfare, experienced a drastic decline. The Third Way largely fell out of favour in a phenomenon known as Pasokification. Scholars have linked the decline of social democratic parties to the declining number of industrial workers, greater economic prosperity of voters and a tendency for these parties to shift from the left to the centre on economic issues. They alienated their former base of supporters and voters in the process. This decline has been matched by increased support for more left-wing and left-wing populist parties, as well as for Left and Green social democratic parties that reject neoliberal and Third Way policies.

Social democracy was highly influential throughout the 20th century. Starting in the 1920s and 1930s, with the aftermath of World War I and that of the Great Depression, social democrats were elected to power. In countries such as Britain, Germany and Sweden, social democrats passed social reforms and adopted proto-Keynesian approaches that would be promoted across the Western world in the post-war period, lasting until the 1970s and 1990s. Academics, political commentators and other scholars tend to distinguish between authoritarian socialist and democratic socialist states, with the first representing the Soviet Bloc and the latter representing Western Bloc countries which have been democratically governed by socialist parties such as Britain, France, Sweden and Western social democracies in general, among others. Social democracy has been criticized by both the left and right. The left criticizes social democracy for having betrayed the working class during World War I and for playing a role in the failure of the proletarian 1917–1924 revolutionary wave. It further accuses social democrats of having abandoned socialism. Conversely, one critique of the right is mainly related to their criticism of welfare. Another criticism concerns the compatibility of democracy and socialism.

== Late 18th century to late 19th century ==
=== Revolutions and origins in the socialist movement (1793–1864) ===
The concept of social democracy goes back to the French Revolution and the bourgeois-democratic Revolutions of 1848, with historians such as Albert Mathiez seeing the French Constitution of 1793 as an example and inspiration whilst labelling Maximilien Robespierre as the founding father of social democracy. It was Friedrich Engels who, in the second chapter of his 1844 article "The Condition of England", first coined the term "social democracy" while describing the future of England's political system. The origins of social democracy as a working-class movement have been traced to the 1860s, with the rise of the first major working-class party in Europe, the General German Workers' Association (ADAV) founded in 1863 by Ferdinand Lassalle. The 1860s saw the concept of social democracy deliberately distinguishing itself from that of liberal democracy. As Theodore Draper explains in The Roots of American Communism, there were two competing social democratic versions of socialism in 19th-century Europe, especially in Germany, where there was a rivalry over political influence between the Lassalleans and the Marxists. Although the latter theoretically won out by the late 1860s and Lassalle had died early in 1864, in practice the Lassallians won out as their national-style social democracy and reformist socialism influenced the revisionist development of the 1880s and 1910s. The year 1864 saw the founding of the International Workingmen's Association, also known as the First International. It brought together socialists of various stances and initially caused a conflict between Karl Marx and the anarchists, who were led by Mikhail Bakunin, over the role of the state in socialism, with Bakunin rejecting any role for the state. Another issue in the First International was the question of reformism and its role within socialism.

=== First International era, Lassalleans, and Marxists (1864–1889) ===
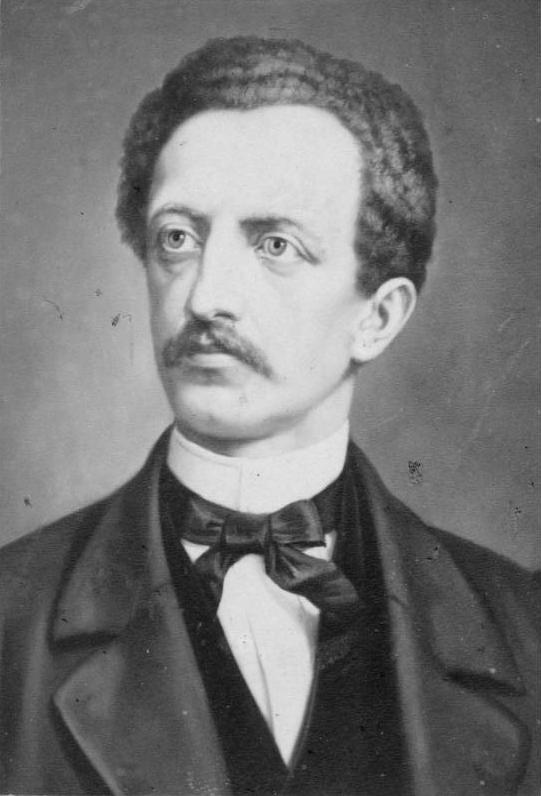
Ferdinand Lassalle, founder of the General German Workers' Association

Although Lassalle was not a Marxist, he was influenced by the theories of Marx and Friedrich Engels and accepted the existence and importance of class struggle. Unlike Marx and Engels' Communist Manifesto, Lassalle promoted class struggle in a more moderate form. While Marx's theory of the state saw it negatively as an instrument of class rule that should only exist temporarily upon the rise to power of the proletariat and then dismantled, Lassalle accepted the state. Lassalle viewed the state as a means through which workers could enhance their interests and even transform the society to create an economy based on worker-run cooperatives. Lassalle's strategy was primarily electoral and reformist, with Lassalleans contending that the working class needed a political party that fought above all for universal adult male suffrage.

A timeline showing the development of socialist parties in Germany before World War II, including its two bans

The ADAV's party newspaper was called The Social Democrat (German: Der Sozialdemokrat). Marx and Engels responded to the title Sozialdemocrat with distaste and Engels once writing: "But what a title: Sozialdemokrat! ... Why do they not call the thing simply The Proletarian". Marx agreed with Engels that Sozialdemokrat was a bad title. Although the origins of the name Sozialdemokrat actually traced back to Marx's German translation in 1848 of the Democratic Socialist Party (French: Partie Democrat-Socialist) into the Party of Social Democracy (German: Partei der Sozialdemokratie), Marx did not like this French party because he viewed it as dominated by the middle class and associated the word Sozialdemokrat with that party. There was a Marxist faction within the ADAV represented by Wilhelm Liebknecht, who became one of the editors of the Der Sozialdemokrat. While democrats looked to the Revolutions of 1848 as a democratic revolution which in the long run ensured liberty, equality and fraternity, Marxists denounced 1848 as a betrayal of working-class ideals by a bourgeoisie indifferent to the legitimate demands of the proletariat.

Faced with opposition from liberal capitalists to his socialist policies, Lassalle controversially attempted to forge a tactical alliance with the conservative aristocratic Junkers due to their communitarian anti-bourgeois attitudes as well as with Prussian Chancellor Otto von Bismarck. Friction in the ADAV arose over Lassalle's policy of a friendly approach to Bismarck that had incorrectly presumed that Bismarck would in turn be friendly towards them. This approach was opposed by the party's faction associated with Marx and Engels, including Liebknecht. Opposition in the ADAV to Lassalle's friendly approach to Bismarck's government resulted in Liebknecht resigning from his position as editor of Sozialdemokrat and leaving the ADAV in 1865. In 1869, August Bebel and Liebknecht founded the Social Democratic Workers' Party of Germany (SDAP) as a merger of the petty-bourgeois Saxon People's Party (SVP), a faction of the ADAV and members of the League of German Workers' Associations (VDA).

Although the SDAP was not officially Marxist, it was the first major working-class organization to be led by Marxists and both Marx and Engels had direct association with the party. The party adopted stances similar to those adopted by Marx at the First International. There was intense rivalry and antagonism between the SDAP and the ADAV, with the SDAP being highly hostile to the Prussian government while the ADAV pursued a reformist and more cooperative approach. This rivalry reached its height involving the two parties' stances on the Franco-Prussian War, with the SDAP refusing to support Prussia's war effort by claiming it was an imperialist war pursued by Bismarck while the ADAV supported the war as a defensive one because it saw Emperor Napoleon III and France as an "overreacting aggressor".

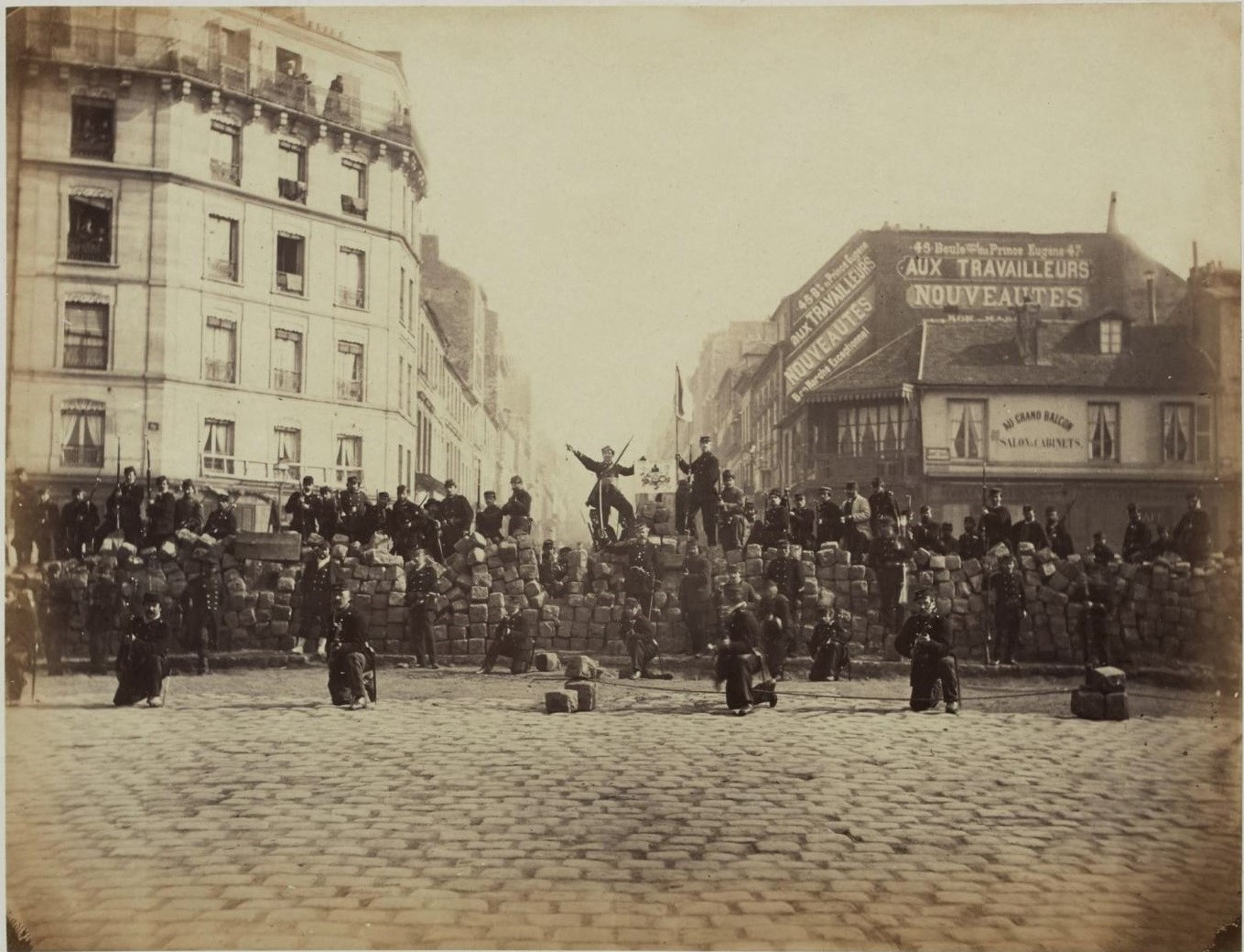
A Parisian barricade set up by revolutionary forces of the Paris Commune in March 1871

In the aftermath of the defeat of France in the Franco-Prussian War, revolution broke out in France, with revolutionary army members along with working-class revolutionaries founding the Paris Commune. The Paris Commune appealed both to the citizens of Paris regardless of class as well as to the working class, a major base of support for the government, via militant rhetoric. In spite of such militant rhetoric to appeal to the working class, the Paris Commune received substantial support from the middle-class bourgeoisie of Paris, including shopkeepers and merchants. In part due to its sizeable number neo-Proudhonians and neo-Jacobins in the Central Committee, the Paris Commune declared that it was not opposed to private property, but that it rather hoped to create the widest distribution of it. The political composition of the Paris Commune included twenty-five neo-Jacobins, fifteen to twenty neo-Proudhonians and proto-syndicalists, nine or ten Blanquists, a variety of radical republicans and a few members of the First International influenced by Marx.

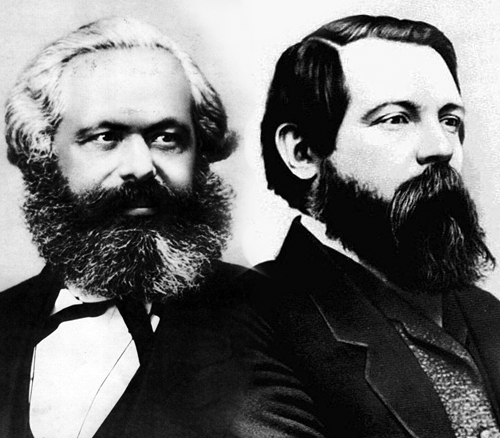
Karl Marx and Friedrich Engels, who had great influence on the social democratic movement

In the aftermath of the Paris Commune's collapse in 1871, Marx praised it in his work The Civil War in France (1871) for its achievements in spite of its pro-bourgeois influences and called it an excellent model of the dictatorship of the proletariat in practice as it had dismantled the apparatus of the bourgeois state, including its huge bureaucracy, military and executive, judicial and legislative institutions, replacing it with a working-class state with broad popular support. The Paris Commune's collapse and the persecution of its anarchist supporters had the effect of weakening the influence of the Bakuninist anarchists in the First International which resulted in Marx expelling the weakened rival Bakuninists from the International a year later. In Britain, the achievement of the legalization of trade unions under the Trade Union Act 1871 drew British trade unionists to believe that working conditions could be improved through parliamentary means.

At the Hague Congress of 1872, Marx made a remark in which he admitted that while there are countries "where the workers can attain their goal by peaceful means", in most European countries "the lever of our revolution must be force". In 1875, Marx attacked the Gotha Program that became the program of the Social Democratic Party of Germany (SDP) in the same year in his Critique of the Gotha Program. Marx was not optimistic that Germany at the time was open to a peaceful means to achieve socialism, especially after German Chancellor Otto von Bismarck had enacted the Anti-Socialist Laws in 1878. At the time of the Anti-Socialist Laws beginning to be drafted but not yet published in 1878, Marx spoke of the possibilities of legislative reforms by an elected government composed of working-class legislative members, but also of the willingness to use force should force be used against the working class.

In his study England in 1845 and in 1885, Engels wrote a study that analysed the changes in the British class system from 1845 to 1885 in which he commended the Chartist movement for being responsible for the achievement of major breakthroughs for the working class. Engels stated that during this time Britain's industrial bourgeoisie had learned that "the middle class can never obtain full social and political power over the nation except by the help of the working class". In addition, he noticed a "gradual change over the relations between the two classes". This change he described was manifested in the change of laws in Britain that granted political changes in favour of the working class that the Chartist movement had demanded for years, arguing that they made a "near approach to 'universal suffrage', at least such as it now exists in Germany".

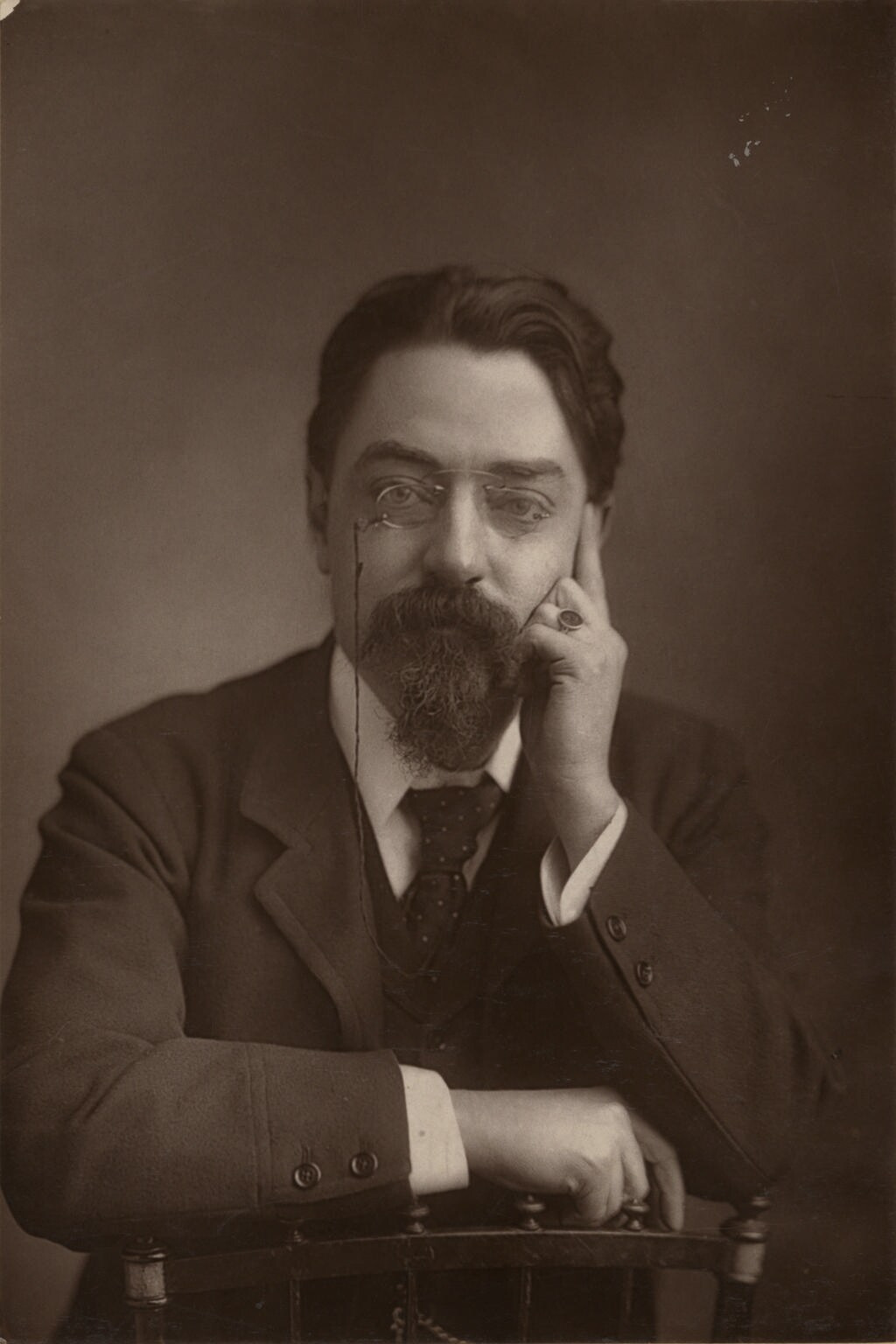
Sidney Webb, a prominent and influential leader within the Fabian socialist movement

A major non-Marxian influence on social democracy came from the British Fabian Society. Founded in 1884 by Frank Podmore, it emphasized the need for a gradualist evolutionary and reformist approach to the achievement of socialism. The Fabian Society was founded as a splinter group from the Fellowship of the New Life due to opposition within that group to socialism. Unlike Marxism, Fabianism did not promote itself as a working-class movement and it largely had middle-class members. The Fabian Society published the Fabian Essays on Socialism (1889), substantially written by George Bernard Shaw. Shaw referred to Fabians as "all Social Democrats, with a common confiction [sic] of the necessity of vesting the organization of industry and the material of production in a State identified with the whole people by complete Democracy". Other important early Fabians included Sidney Webb, who from 1887 to 1891 wrote the bulk of the Fabian Society's official policies. Fabianism would become a major influence on the British labour movement.

The Social Democrat Hunchakian Party was formed in 1887, the oldest political party in Armenia and first socialist party in the Ottoman Empire.

== Late 19th century to early 20th century ==
=== Second International era and reform or revolution dispute (1889–1914) ===
The social democratic movement came into being through a division within the socialist movement. Starting in the 1880s and culminating in the 1910s and 1920s, there was a division within the socialist movement between those who insisted upon political revolution as a precondition for the achievement of socialist goals and those who maintained that a gradual or evolutionary path to socialism was both possible and desirable. German social democracy as exemplified by the SPD was the model for the world social democratic movement.

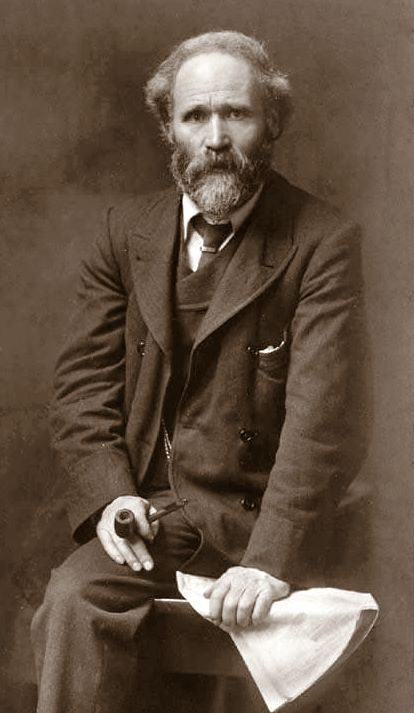
Keir Hardie, founder of the British Labour Party

The influence of the Fabian Society in Britain grew in the British socialist movement in the 1890s, especially within the Independent Labour Party (ILP) founded in 1893. Important ILP members were affiliated with the Fabian Society, including Keir Hardie and Ramsay MacDonald—the future British Prime Minister. Fabian influence in British government affairs also emerged such as Fabian member Sidney Webb being chosen to take part in writing what became the Minority Report of the Royal Commission on Labour. While he was nominally a member of the Fabian Society, Hardie had close relations with certain Fabians such as Shaw while he was antagonistic to others such as the Webbs. As ILP leader, Hardie rejected revolutionary politics while declaring that he believed the party's tactics should be "as constitutional as the Fabians".

Another important Fabian figure who joined the ILP was Robert Blatchford who wrote the work Merrie England (1894) that endorsed municipal socialism. Merrie England was a major publication that sold 750,000 copies within one year. In Merrie England, Blatchford distinguished two types of socialism, namely an ideal socialism and a practical socialism. Blatchford's practical socialism was a state socialism that identified existing state enterprise such as the Post Office run by the municipalities as a demonstration of practical socialism in action while claiming that practical socialism should involve the extension of state enterprise to the means of production as common property of the people. Although endorsing state socialism, Blatchford's Merrie England and his other writings were nonetheless influenced by anarcho-communist William Morris—as Blatchford himself attested to—and Morris' anarcho-communist themes are present in Merrie England. Shaw published the Report on Fabian Policy (1896) that declared: "The Fabian Society does not suggest that the State should monopolize industry as against private enterprise or individual initiative".

Major developments in social democracy as a whole emerged with the ascendance of Eduard Bernstein as a proponent of reformist socialism and an adherent of Marxism. Bernstein had resided in Britain in the 1880s at the time when Fabianism was arising and is believed to have been strongly influenced by Fabianism. However, he publicly denied having strong Fabian influences on his thought. Bernstein did acknowledge that he was influenced by Kantian epistemological scepticism while he rejected Hegelianism. He and his supporters urged the SPD to merge Kantian ethics with Marxian political economy. On the role of Kantian criticism within socialism which "can serve as a pointer to the satisfying solution to our problem", Bernstein argued that "[o]ur critique must be direct against both a scepticism that undermines all theoretical thought, and a dogmatism that relies on ready-made formulas". An evolutionist rather than a revolutionist, his policy of gradualism rejected the radical overthrow of capitalism and advocated legal reforms through legislative democratic channels to achieve socialist objectives—i.e. social democracy must cooperatively work within existing capitalist societies to promote and foster the creation of socialist society. As capitalism grew stronger, Bernstein rejected the view of some orthodox Marxists that socialism would come after a catastrophic crisis of capitalism. He came to believe that rather than socialism developing with a social revolution, capitalism would eventually evolve into socialism through social reforms. Bernstein commended Marx's and Engels' later works which advocated that socialism should be achieved through parliamentary democratic means wherever possible.

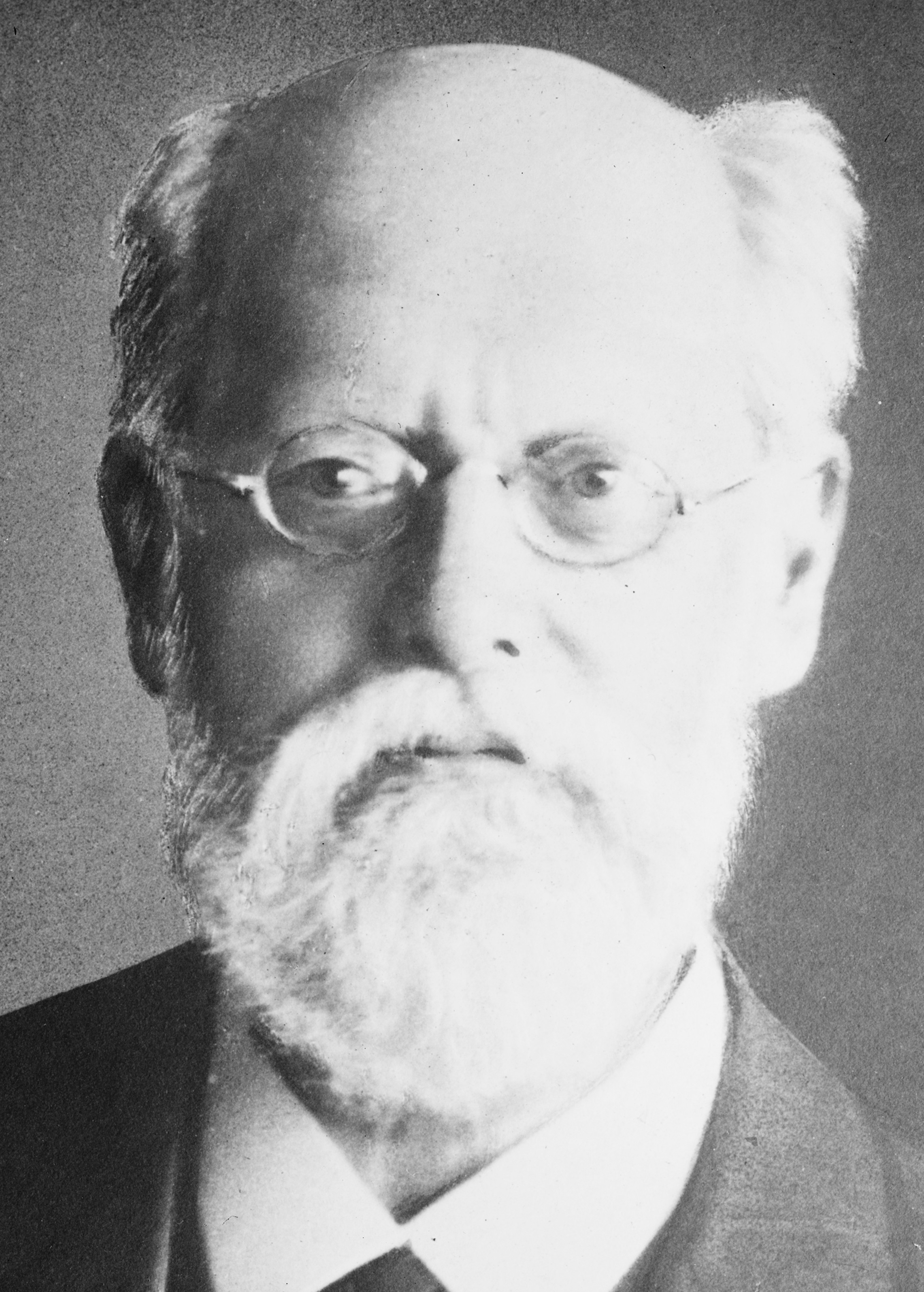
Karl Kautsky, a prominent orthodox Marxist thinker who was nicknamed as "the pope of Marxism"

The term revisionist was applied to Bernstein by his critics, who referred to themselves as orthodox Marxists, although Bernstein claimed that his principles were consistent with Marx's and Engels' stances, especially in their later years when they advocated that socialism should be achieved through parliamentary democratic means wherever possible. Bernstein and his faction of revisionists criticized orthodox Marxism and particularly its founder Karl Kautsky for having disregarded Marx's view of the necessity of evolution of capitalism to achieve socialism by replacing it with an either/or polarization between capitalism and socialism, claiming that Kautsky disregarded Marx's emphasis on the role of parliamentary democracy in achieving socialism as well as criticizing Kautsky for his idealization of state socialism. Despite Bernstein and his revisionist faction's accusations, Kautsky did not deny a role for democracy in the achievement of socialism as he argued that Marx's dictatorship of the proletariat was not a form of government that rejected democracy as critics had claimed it was, but rather it was a state of affairs that Marx expected would arise should the proletariat gain power and be faced with fighting a violent reactionary opposition.

Bernstein had held close association to Marx and Engels, but he saw flaws in Marxian thinking and began such criticism when he investigated and challenged the Marxian materialist theory of history. He rejected significant parts of Marxian theory that were based upon Hegelian metaphysics and also rejected the Hegelian dialectical perspective. Bernstein distinguished between early Marxism as being its immature form as exemplified by The Communist Manifesto, written by Marx and Engels in their youth, that he opposed for what he regarded as its violent Blanquist tendencies; and later Marxism as being its mature form that he supported. Bernstein declared that the massive and homogeneous working class claimed in The Communist Manifesto did not exist. Contrary to claims of a proletarian majority emerging, the middle class was growing under capitalism and not disappearing as Marx had claimed. Bernstein noted that rather than the working class being homogeneous, it was heterogeneous, with divisions and factions within it, including socialist and non-socialist trade unions. In his work Theories of Surplus Value, Marx himself later in his life acknowledged that the middle class was not disappearing, but his acknowledgement of this error is not well known due to the popularity of The Communist Manifesto and the relative obscurity of Theories of Surplus Value.

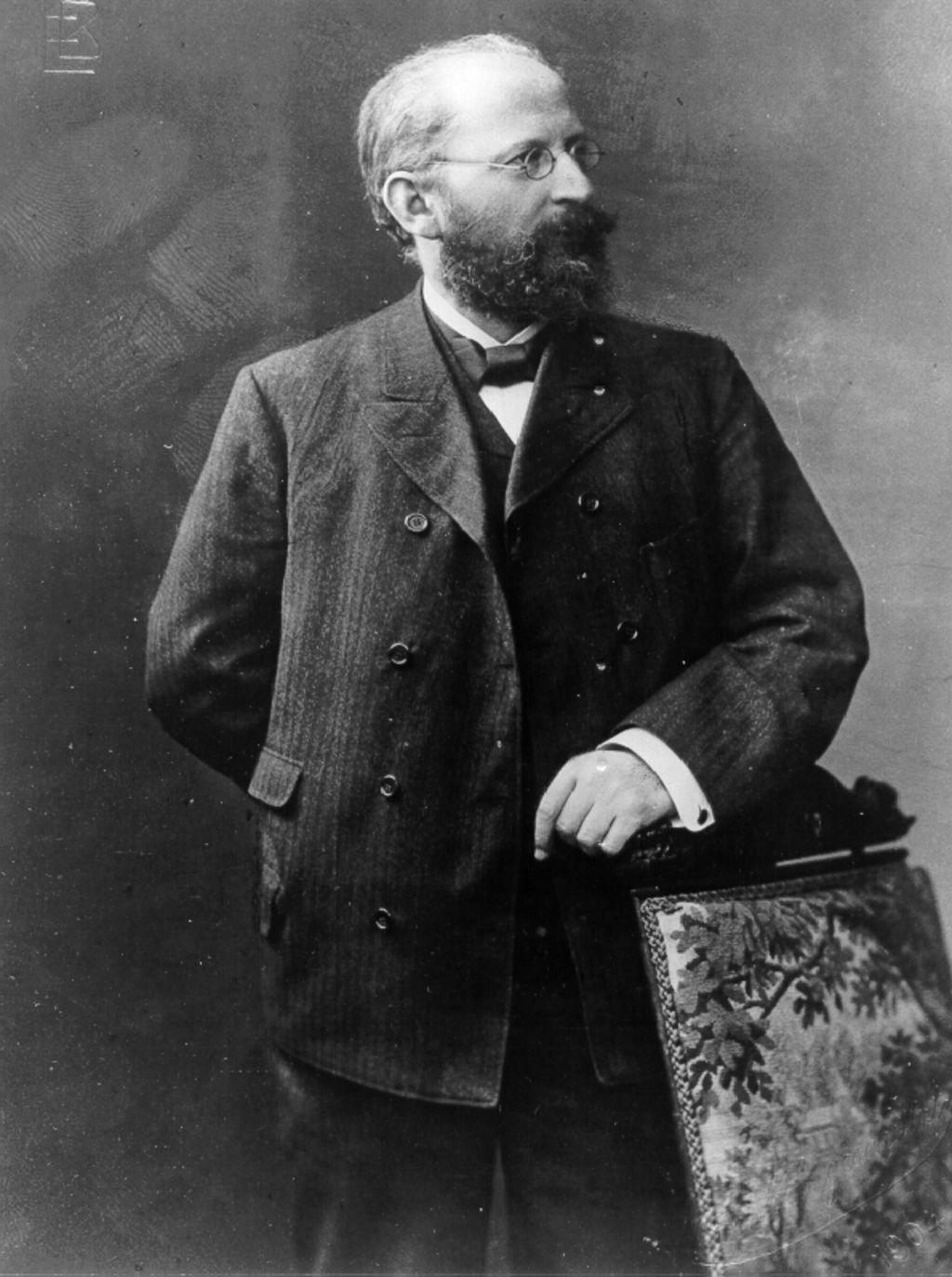
Eduard Bernstein, a notable Marxist revisionist who supported reformism and liberal democracy

Bernstein criticized Marxism's concept of "irreconciliable class conflicts" and Marxism's hostility to liberalism. He challenged Marx's position on liberalism by claiming that liberal democrats and social democrats held common grounds that he claimed could be utilized to create a "socialist republic". He believed that economic class disparities between the bourgeoisie and the proletariat would gradually be eliminated through legal reforms and economic redistribution programs. Bernstein rejected the Marxian principle of dictatorship of the proletariat, claiming that gradualist democratic reforms would improve the rights of the working class. According to Bernstein, social democracy did not seek to create a socialism separate from bourgeois society, but it instead sought to create a common development based on Western humanism. The development of socialism under social democracy does not seek to rupture existing society and its cultural traditions, but rather to act as an enterprise of extension and growth. Furthermore, he believed that class cooperation was a preferable course to achieve socialism than class conflict.

Bernstein responded to critics that he was not destroying Marxism and instead claimed he was modernizing it as it was required "to separate the vital parts of Marx's theory from its outdated accessories". He asserted his support for the Marxian conception of a "scientifically based" socialist movement and said that such a movement's goals must be determined in accordance with "knowledge capable of objective proof, that is, knowledge which refers to, and conforms with, nothing but empirical knowledge and logic". Bernstein was also strongly opposed to dogmatism within the Marxist movement. Despite embracing a mixed economy, Bernstein was sceptical of welfare state policies, believing them to be helpful, but ultimately secondary to the main social democratic goal of replacing capitalism with socialism, fearing that state aid to the unemployed might lead to the sanctioning of a new form of pauperism.

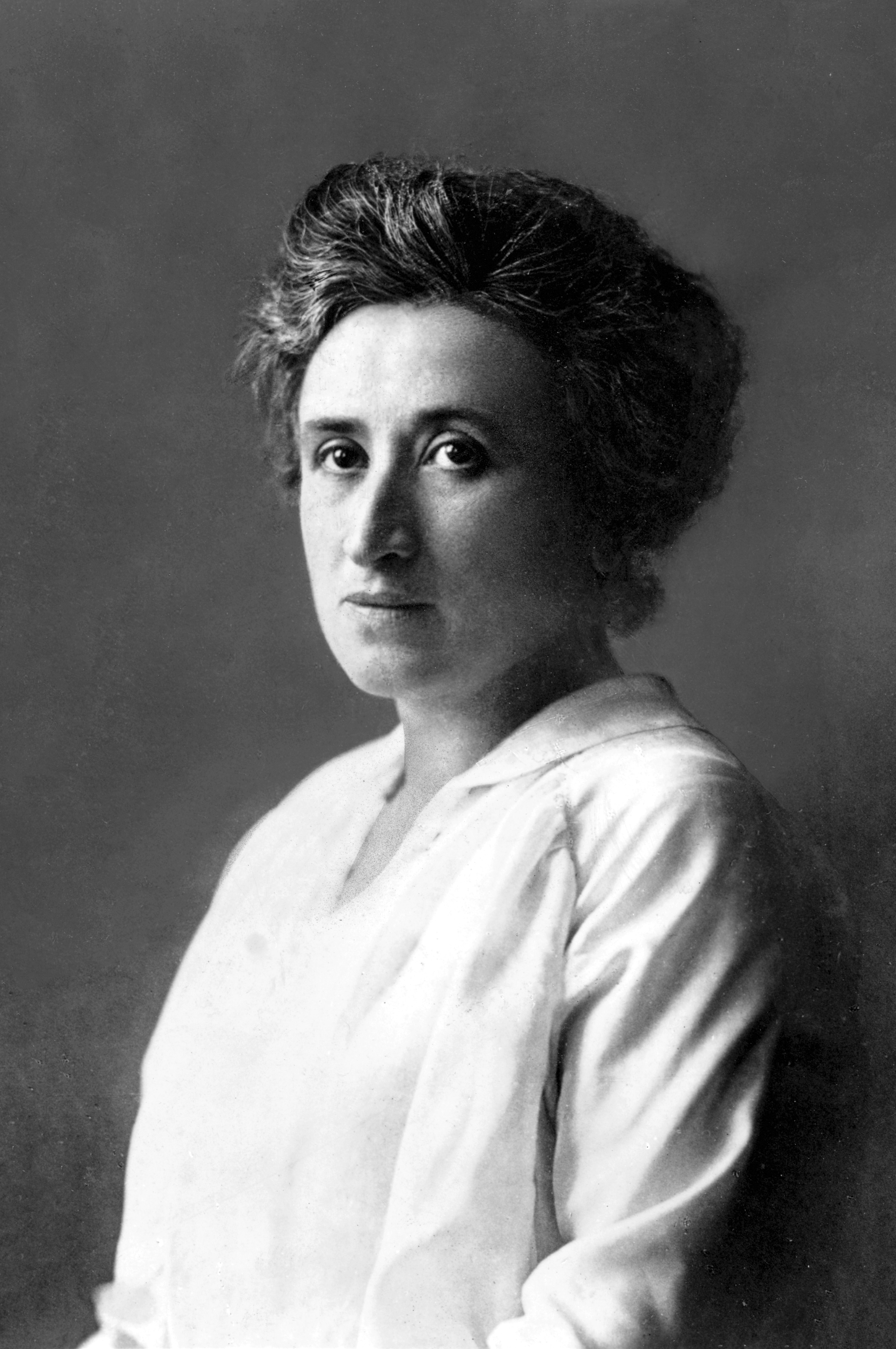
Rosa Luxemburg, a Marxist who argued in favour of revolutionary socialism

Representing revolutionary socialism, Rosa Luxemburg staunchly condemned Bernstein's revisionism and reformism for being based on "opportunism in social democracy". Luxemburg likened Bernstein's policies to that of the dispute between Marxists and the opportunistic Praktiker ("pragmatists"). She denounced Bernstein's evolutionary socialism for being a "petty-bourgeois vulgarization of Marxism" and claimed that Bernstein's years of exile in Britain had made him lose familiarity with the situation in Germany, where he was promoting evolutionary socialism. Luxemburg sought to maintain social democracy as a revolutionary Marxist creed. Both Kautsky and Luxemburg condemned Bernstein's philosophy of science as flawed for having abandoned Hegelian dialectics for Kantian philosophical dualism. Russian Marxist George Plekhanov joined Kautsky and Luxemburg in condemning Bernstein for having a neo-Kantian philosophy. Kautsky and Luxemburg contended that Bernstein's empiricist viewpoints depersonalized and dehistoricized the social observer and reducing objects down to facts. Luxemburg associated Bernstein with ethical socialists who she identified as being associated with the bourgeoisie and Kantian liberalism.

In his introduction to the 1895 edition of Marx's The Class Struggles in France, Engels attempted to resolve the division between gradualist reformists and revolutionaries in the Marxist movement by declaring that he was in favour of short-term tactics of electoral politics that included gradualist and evolutionary socialist measures while maintaining his belief that revolutionary seizure of power by the proletariat should remain a goal. In spite of this attempt by Engels to merge gradualism and revolution, his effort only diluted the distinction of gradualism and revolution and had the effect of strengthening the position of the revisionists. Engels' statements in the French newspaper Le Figaro in which he wrote that "revolution" and the "so-called socialist society" were not fixed concepts, but rather constantly changing social phenomena and argued that this made "us socialists all evolutionists", increased the public perception that Engels was gravitating towards evolutionary socialism. Engels also argued that it would be "suicidal" to talk about a revolutionary seizure of power at a time when the historical circumstances favoured a parliamentary road to power that he predicted could bring "social democracy into power as early as 1898". Engels' stance of openly accepting gradualist, evolutionary and parliamentary tactics while claiming that the historical circumstances did not favour revolution caused confusion. Bernstein interpreted this as indicating that Engels was moving towards accepting parliamentary reformist and gradualist stances, but he ignored that Engels' stances were tactical as a response to the particular circumstances and that Engels was still committed to revolutionary socialism.

Engels was deeply distressed when he discovered that his introduction to a new edition of The Class Struggles in France had been edited by Bernstein and Kautsky in a manner which left the impression that he had become a proponent of a peaceful road to socialism. While highlighting The Communist Manifesto's emphasis on winning as a first step the "battle of democracy", Engels also wrote to Kautsky the following on 1 April 1895, four months before his death: "I was amazed to see today in the Vorwärts an excerpt from my 'Introduction' that had been printed without my knowledge and tricked out in such a way as to present me as a peace-loving proponent of legality quand même. (Note: Quand même literally means "come what may", but it is better translated as "at all costs".) Which is all the more reason why I should like it to appear in its entirety in the Neue Zeit in order that this disgraceful impression may be erased. I shall leave Liebknecht in no doubt as to what I think about it and the same applies to those who, irrespective of who they may be, gave him this opportunity of perverting my views and, what's more, without so much as a word to me about it."

After delivering a lecture in Britain to the Fabian Society titled "On What Marx Really Taught" in 1897, Bernstein wrote a letter to the orthodox Marxist August Bebel in which he revealed that he felt conflicted with what he had said at the lecture as well as revealing his intentions regarding revision of Marxism. What Bernstein meant was that he believed that Marx was wrong in assuming that the capitalist economy would collapse as a result of its internal contradictions as by the mid-1890s there was little evidence of such internal contradictions causing this to capitalism. In practice, the SPD "behaved as a Revisionist party and, at the same time, to condemn Revisionism; it continued to preach revolution and to practice reform", notwithstanding its "doctrinal Marxism". The SPD became a party of reform, with social democracy representing "a party that strives after the socialist transformation of society by the means of democratic and economic reforms". This has been described as central to the understanding of 20th-century social democracy.

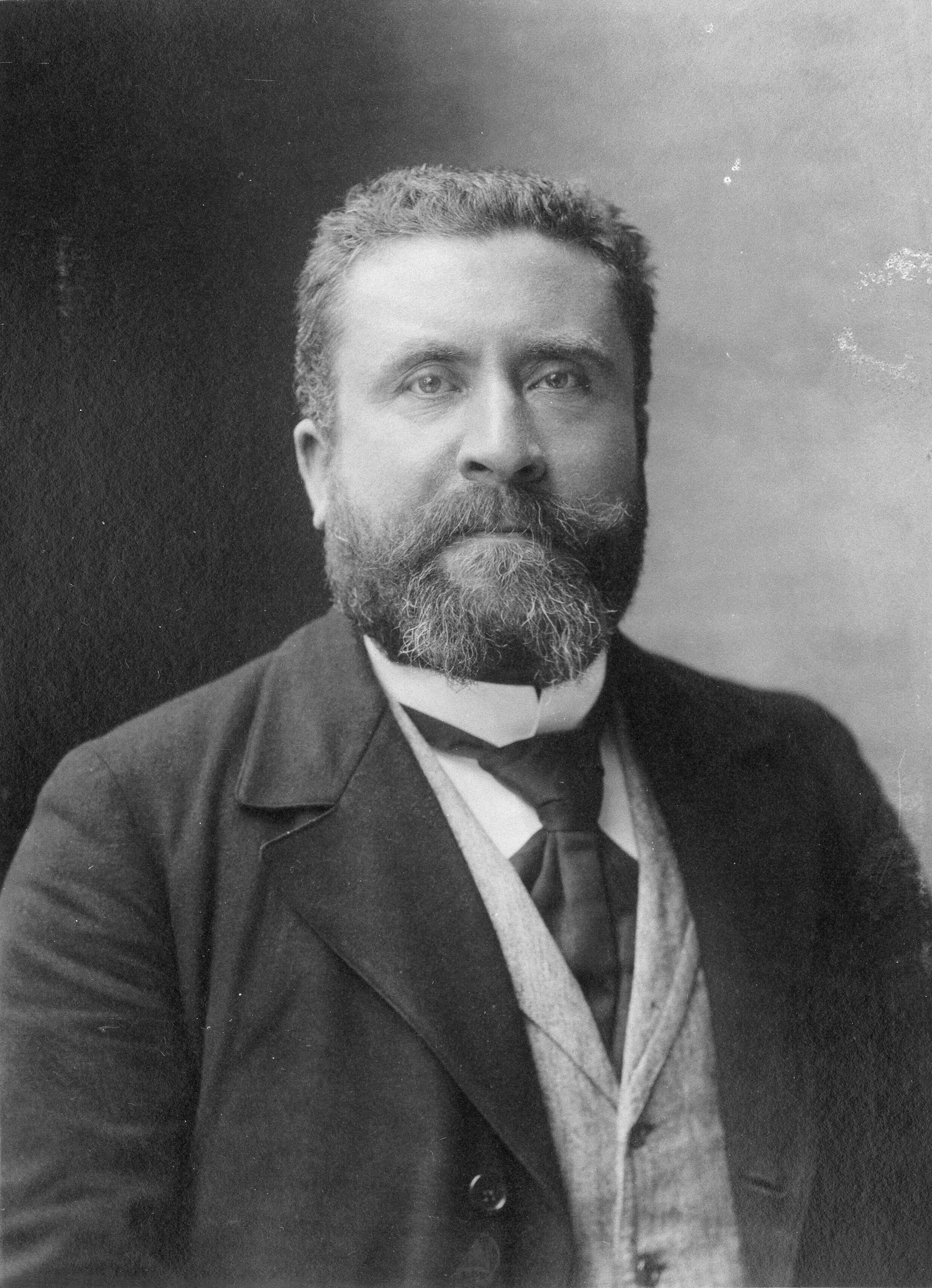
Jean Jaurès, a pacifist socialist and one of the historical leaders of the French Section of the Workers' International

The dispute over policies in favour of reform or revolution dominated discussions at the 1899 Hanover Party Conference of the SPD. This issue had become especially prominent with the Millerand affair in France in which Alexandre Millerand of the Independent Socialists joined the non-socialist and liberal government of Prime Minister Waldeck-Rousseau without seeking support from his party's leadership. Millerand's actions provoked outrage amongst revolutionary socialists within the Second International, including the anarchist left and Jules Guesde's revolutionary Marxists. In response to these disputes over reform or revolution, the 1900 Paris Congress of the Second International declared a resolution to the dispute in which Guesde's demands were partially accepted in a resolution drafted by Kautsky that declared that overall socialists should not take part in a non-socialist government, but he provided exceptions to this rule where necessary to provide the "protection of the achievements of the working class".

Another prominent figure who influenced social democracy was French revisionist Marxist and reformist socialist Jean Jaurès. During the 1904 Congress of the Second International, Jaurès challenged orthodox Marxist August Bebel, the mentor of Kautsky, over his promotion of monolithic socialist tactics. He claimed that no coherent socialist platform could be equally applicable to different countries and regions due to different political systems in them, noting that Bebel's homeland of Germany at the time was very authoritarian and had limited parliamentary democracy. Jaurès compared the limited political influence of socialism in government in Germany to the substantial influence that socialism had gained in France due to its stronger parliamentary democracy. He claimed that the example of the political differences between Germany and France demonstrated that monolithic socialist tactics were impossible, given the political differences of various countries. Meanwhile, the Australian Labor Party formed the world's first labour party government as well as the world's first social democratic government at a national level in 1910. Previously, Chris Watson was prime minister for a few months in 1904, representing the first socialist democratically elected as the head of government.

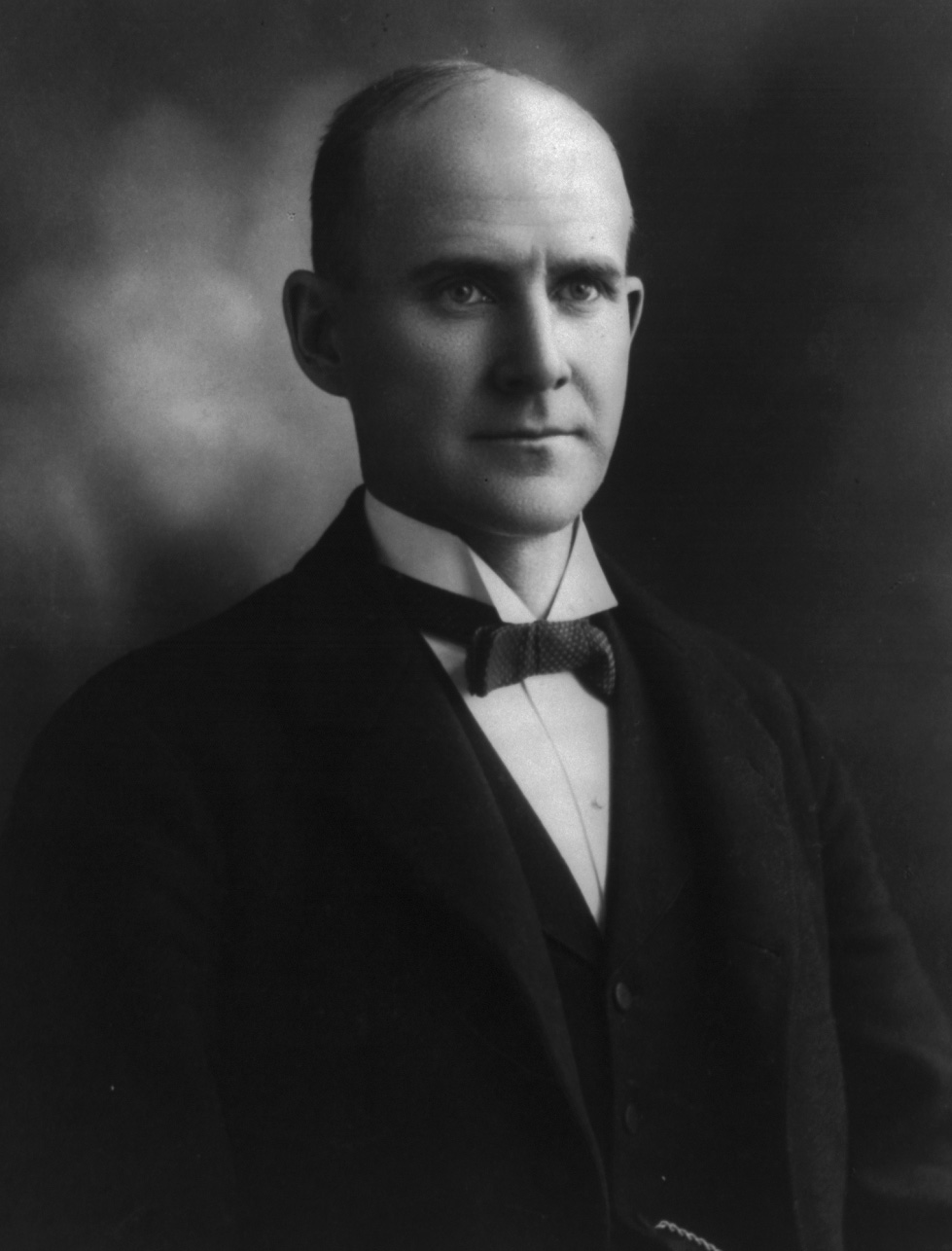
Eugene V. Debs, a prominent social democrat leader and presidential candidate for the Socialist Party of America

In spite of the two Red Scare periods which substantially hindered the development of the socialist movement, left-wing parties and labour and trade union movements which advocated or supported social democratic policies have been popular and exerted their influence in American politics. These included the progressive movement and its namesake parties of 1912, 1924 and 1948, with the Progressive presidential campaign of former Republican Theodore Roosevelt winning 27.4% of the popular vote, compared to the Republican campaign of President William Howard Taft's 23.2% in the 1912 presidential election which was ultimately won by the progressive Democratic candidate Woodrow Wilson, (Note: See Wilson, Woodrow (22 August 1887). "Socialism and Democracy". In Link, Arthur S., ed. (1968). The Papers of Woodrow Wilson (1st ed.). 5. Princeton, New Jersey: Princeton University Press. pp. 559–562. ISBN 9780691045870. "In fundamental theory socialism and democracy are almost one and the same. Men as communities are supreme over men as individuals. Limits of wisdom and convenience to the public control there may be: limits of principle there are, upon strict analysis, none." In the essay, Wilson advocates "practical means of realizing for society the principles of socialism." See Pestritto, Ronald J.; Wilson, Woodrow (2005). Woodrow Wilson: The Essential Political Writings. Lexington Books. p. 78. ISBN 9780739109519.) making Roosevelt the only third-party presidential nominee in American history to finish with a higher share of the popular vote than a major party's presidential nominee. Furthermore, the city of Milwaukee has been led by a series of democratic socialist mayors from the Socialist Party of America, namely Frank Zeidler, Emil Seidel and Daniel Hoan.

Socialist Party of America presidential candidate Eugene V. Debs obtained 5.99% of the popular vote in the 1912 presidential election, even managing to win nearly one million votes in the 1920 presidential election, despite Debs himself being imprisoned for alleged sedition at that time due to his opposition to World War I. While Wilson's philosophy of New Freedom was largely individualistic, Wilson's actual program resembled the more paternalistic ideals of Theodore Roosevelt ideas such that of New Nationalism, an extension of his earlier philosophy of the Square Deal, excluding the notion of reining in judges. In addition, Robert M. La Follette and Robert M. La Follette Jr. dominated Wisconsin's politics from 1924 to 1934. This included sewer socialism, an originally pejorative term for the socialist movement that centered in Wisconsin from around 1892 to 1960. It was coined by Morris Hillquit at the 1932 Milwaukee convention of the Socialist Party as a commentary on the Milwaukee socialists and their perpetual boasting about the excellent public sewer system in the city. Hillquit was running against Milwaukee mayor Dan Hoan for the position of National Chairman of the Socialist Party at the 1932 convention and the insult may have sprung up in that context.

=== World War I, revolutions, and counter-revolutions (1914–1929) ===
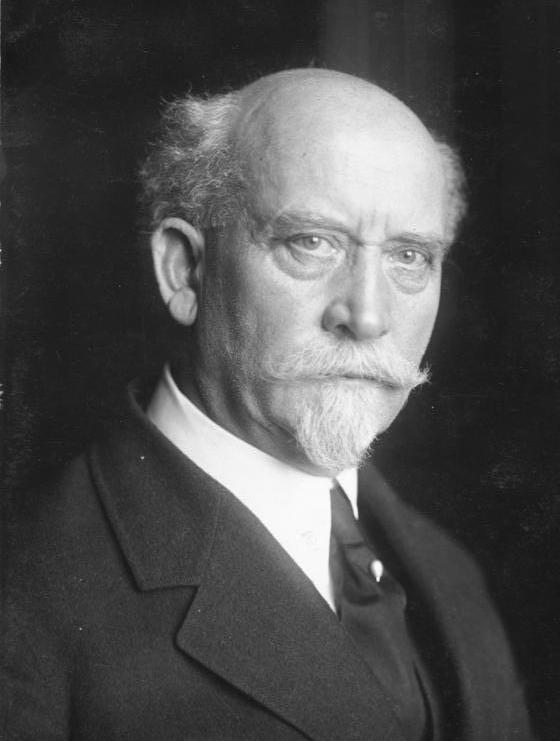
Philipp Scheidemann, a revisionist-nationalist who supported the war

As tensions between Europe's Great Powers escalated in the late 19th and early 20th centuries, Bernstein feared that Germany's arms race with other powers was increasing the possibility of a major European war. Bernstein's fears were ultimately proven to be prophetic when the outbreak of World War I occurred on 28 July 1914, just a month after the assassination of Archduke Franz Ferdinand. Immediately after the outbreak of World War I, Bernstein travelled from Germany to Britain to meet with Labour Party leader Ramsay MacDonald. While Bernstein regarded the outbreak of the war with great dismay and although the two countries were at war with one another, he was honoured at the meeting. In spite of Bernstein's and other social democrats' attempts to secure the unity of the Second International, with national tensions increasing between the countries at war, the Second International collapsed in 1914. Anti-war members of the SPD refused to support finances being given to the German government to support the war. However, a nationalist-revisionist faction of SPD members led by Friedrich Ebert, Gustav Noske and Philipp Scheidemann supported the war, arguing that Germany had the "right to its territorial defense" from the "destruction of Tsarist despotism".

The SPD's decision to support the war, including Bernstein's decision to support it, was heavily influenced by the fact that the German government lied to the German people as it claimed that the only reason Germany had declared war on Russia was because Russia was preparing to invade East Prussia when in fact this was not the case. Jaurès opposed France's intervention in the war and took a pacifist stance, but he was soon assassinated on 31 July 1914 by French nationalist Raoul Villain. Bernstein soon resented the war and by October 1914 was convinced of the German government's war guilt and contacted the orthodox Marxists of the SPD to unite to push the SPD to take an anti-war stance. Kautsky attempted to put aside his differences with Bernstein and join forces in opposing the war and Kautsky praised him for becoming a firm anti-war proponent, saying that although Bernstein had previously supported civic and liberal forms of nationalism, his committed anti-war position made him the "standard-bearer of the internationalist idea of social democracy". The nationalist position by the SPD leadership under Ebert refused to rescind.

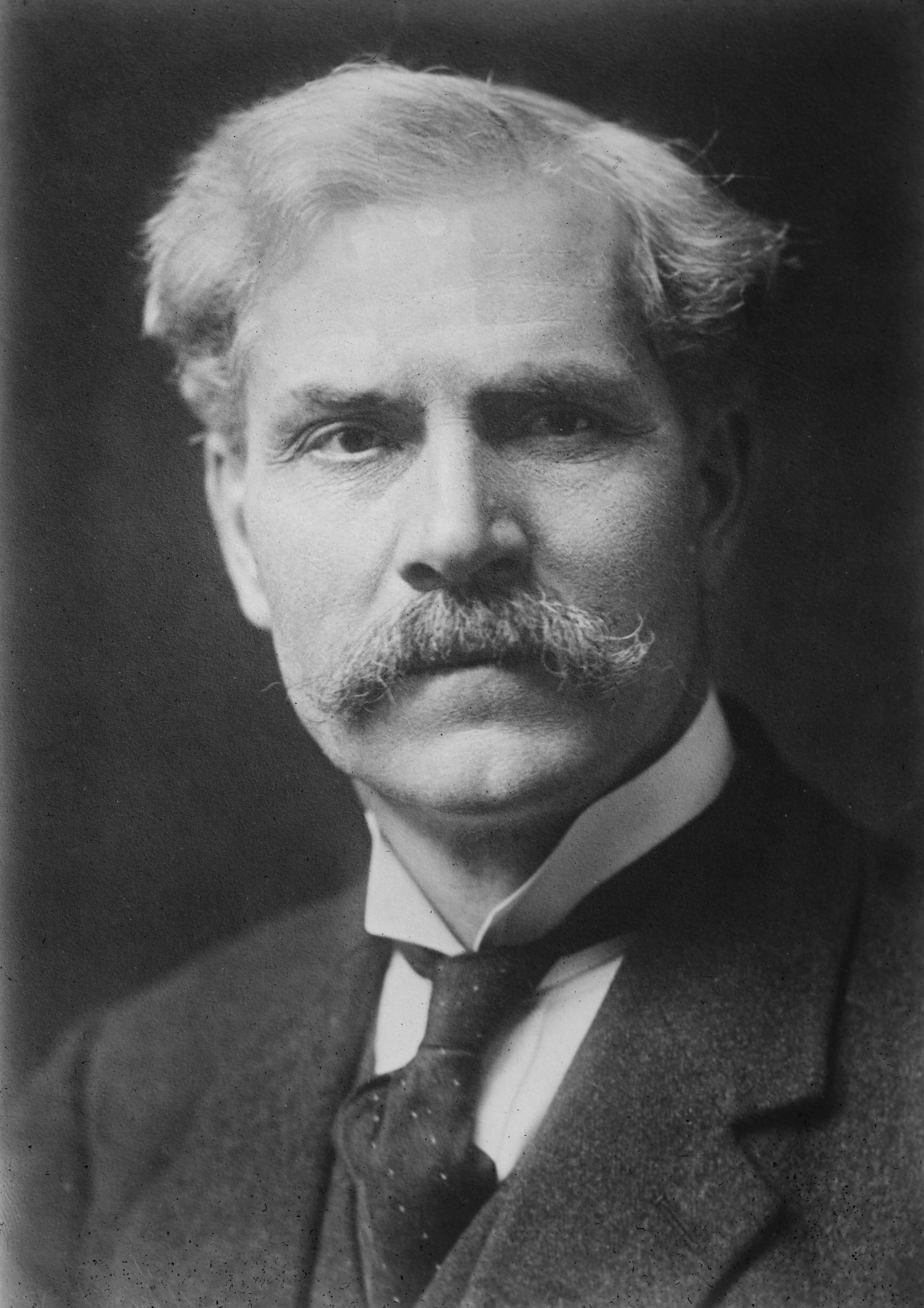
Ramsay MacDonald, prime minister of the United Kingdom (1929–1935)

In Britain, the British Labour Party became divided on the war. Labour Party leader Ramsay MacDonald was one of a handful of British MPs who had denounced Britain's declaration of war on Germany. MacDonald was denounced by the pro-war press on accusations that he was pro-German and a pacifist, both charges that he denied. In response to pro-war sentiments in the Labour Party, MacDonald resigned from being its leader and associated himself with the Independent Labour Party. Arthur Henderson became the new leader of the Labour Party and served as a cabinet minister in prime minister Asquith's war government. After the February Revolution of 1917 in Russia in which the Tsarist regime in Russia was overthrown, MacDonald visited the Russian Provisional Government in June 1917, seeking to persuade Russia to oppose the war and seek peace. His efforts to unite the Russian Provisional Government against the war failed after Russia fell back into political violence resulting in the October Revolution in which the Bolsheviks led Vladimir Lenin's rise to power.

Although MacDonald critically responded to the Bolsheviks' political violence and rise to power by warning of "the danger of anarchy in Russia", he gave political support to the Bolshevik regime until the end of the war because he thought that a democratic internationalism could be revived. The British Labour Party's trade union affiliated membership soared during World War I. With the assistance of Sidney Webb, Henderson designed a new constitution for the Labour Party in which it adopted a strongly left-wing platform in 1918 to ensure that it would not lose support to the newly founded Communist Party of Great Britain, exemplified by Clause IV of the constitution.

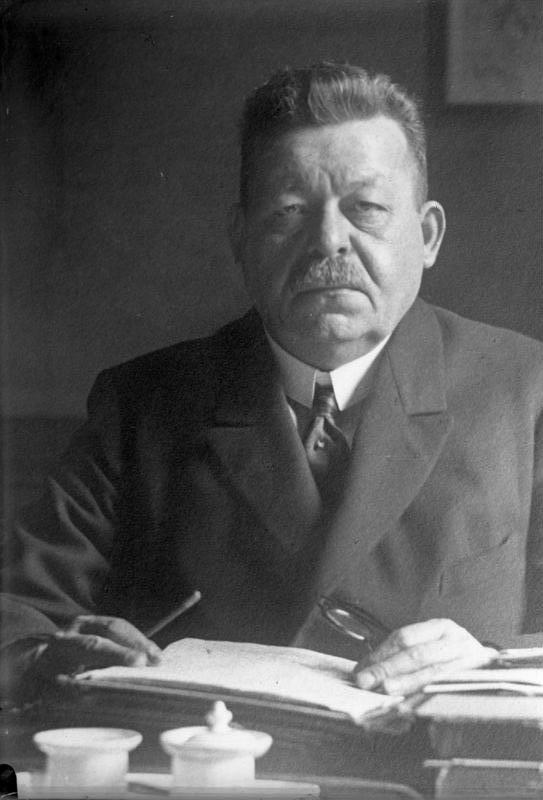
Friedrich Ebert, president of Germany (1919–1925)

The overthrow of the tsarist regime in Russia in February 1917 impacted politics in Germany as it ended the legitimation used by Ebert and other pro-war SPD members that Germany was in the war against a reactionary Russian government. With the overthrow of the tsar and revolutionary socialist agitation increased in Russia, such events influenced socialists in Germany. With rising bread shortages in Germany amid war rationing, mass strikes occurred beginning in April 1917 with 300,000 strikers taking part in a strike in Berlin. The strikers demanded bread, freedom, peace and the formation of workers' councils as was being done in Russia. Amidst the German public's uproar, the SPD alongside the Progressives and the Catholic labour movement in the Reichstag put forward the Peace Resolution on 19 July 1917 that called for a compromise peace to end the war which was passed by a majority of members of the Reichstag. The German High Command opposed the Peace Resolution, but it did seek to end the war with Russia and presented the Treaty of Brest-Litovsk to the Bolshevik government in 1918 that agreed to the terms and the Reichstag passed the treaty which included the support of the SPD, the Progressives and the Catholic political movement.

By late 1918, the war situation for Germany had become hopeless and Kaiser Wilhelm II was pressured to make peace. Wilhelm II appointed a new cabinet that included SPD members. At the same time, the Imperial Naval Command was determined to make a heroic last stand against the British Royal Navy. On 24 October 1918, it issued orders for the German Navy to depart to confront, but the sailors refused, resulting in the Kiel mutiny. The Kiel mutiny resulted in revolution. Faced with military failure and revolution, Prince Maximilian of Baden resigned, giving SPD leader Ebert the position of Chancellor. Wihelm II abdicated the German throne immediately afterwards and the German High Command officials Paul von Hindenburg and Erich Ludendorff resigned whilst refusing to end the war to save face, leaving the Ebert government and the SPD-majority Reichstag to be forced to make the inevitable peace with the Allies and take the blame for having lost the war. With the abdication of Wilhelm II, Ebert declared Germany to be a republic and signed the armistice that ended World War I on 11 November 1918. The new social democratic government in Germany faced political violence in Berlin by a movement of communist revolutionaries known as the Spartacist League, who sought to repeat the feat of Lenin and the Bolsheviks in Russia by overthrowing the German government. Tensions between the governing majority of Social Democrats led by Ebert versus the strongly left-wing elements of the Independent Social Democratic Party (USPD) and communists over Ebert's refusal to immediately reform the German Army resulted in the January rising by the newly formed Communist Party of Germany (KPD) and the USPD which saw communists mobilizing a large workers' demonstration. The SPD responded by holding a counter-demonstration that was effective in demonstrating support for the government and the USPD soon withdrew its support for the rising. However, the communists continued to revolt and between 12 and 28 January 1919 communist forces had seized control of several government buildings in Berlin. Ebert responded by requesting that defense minister Gustav Noske take charge of loyal soldiers to fight the communists and secure the government. Ebert was furious with the communists' intransigence and said that he wished "to teach the radicals a lesson they would never forget".

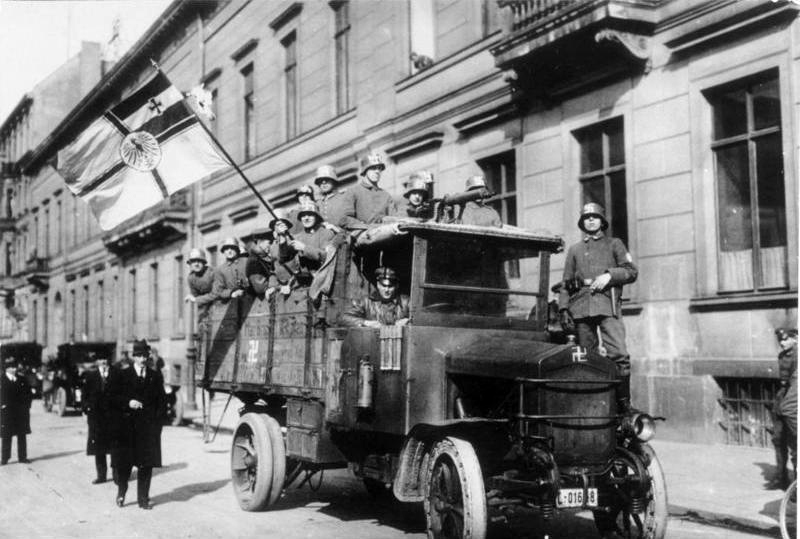
The Freikorps, the anti-communist right-wing paramilitary which Social Democrat defence minister Gustav Noske used to bloodily suppress the communist uprisings of the late 1918 and early 1919

Noske was able to rally groups of mostly reactionary former soldiers, known as the Freikorps, who were eager to fight the communists. The situation soon went completely out of control when the recruited Freikorps went on a violent rampage against workers and murdered the communist leaders Karl Liebknecht and Rosa Luxemburg. The atrocities by the government-recruited Freikorps against the communist revolutionaries badly tarnished the reputation of the SPD and strengthened the confidence of reactionary forces. In spite of this, the SPD was able to win the largest number of seats in the 1919 federal election and Ebert was elected president of Germany. However, the USPD refused to support the government in response to the atrocities committed by the SPD government-recruited Freikorps.

Due to the unrest in Berlin, the drafting of the constitution of the new German republic was undertaken in the city of Weimar and the following political era is referred to as the Weimar Republic. Upon founding the new government, President Ebert cooperated with liberal members of his coalition government to create the Weimar constitution and sought to begin a program of nationalization of some sectors of the economy. Political unrest and violence continued and the government's continued reliance on the help of the far-right and counter-revolutionary Freikorps militias to fight the revolutionary Spartacists further alienated potential left-wing support for the SPD. The SPD coalition government's acceptance of the harsh peace conditions of the Treaty of Versailles in June 1919 infuriated the German right, including the Freikorps that had previously been willing to cooperate with the government to fight the Spartacists. In March 1920, a group of right-wing militarists led by Wolfgang Kapp and former German military chief-of-staff Erich Ludendorff initiated a briefly successful putsch against the German government in what became known as the Kapp Putsch, but the putsch ultimately failed and the government was restored. In the 1920 German federal election, the SPD's share of the vote significantly declined due to their previous ties to the Freikorps.

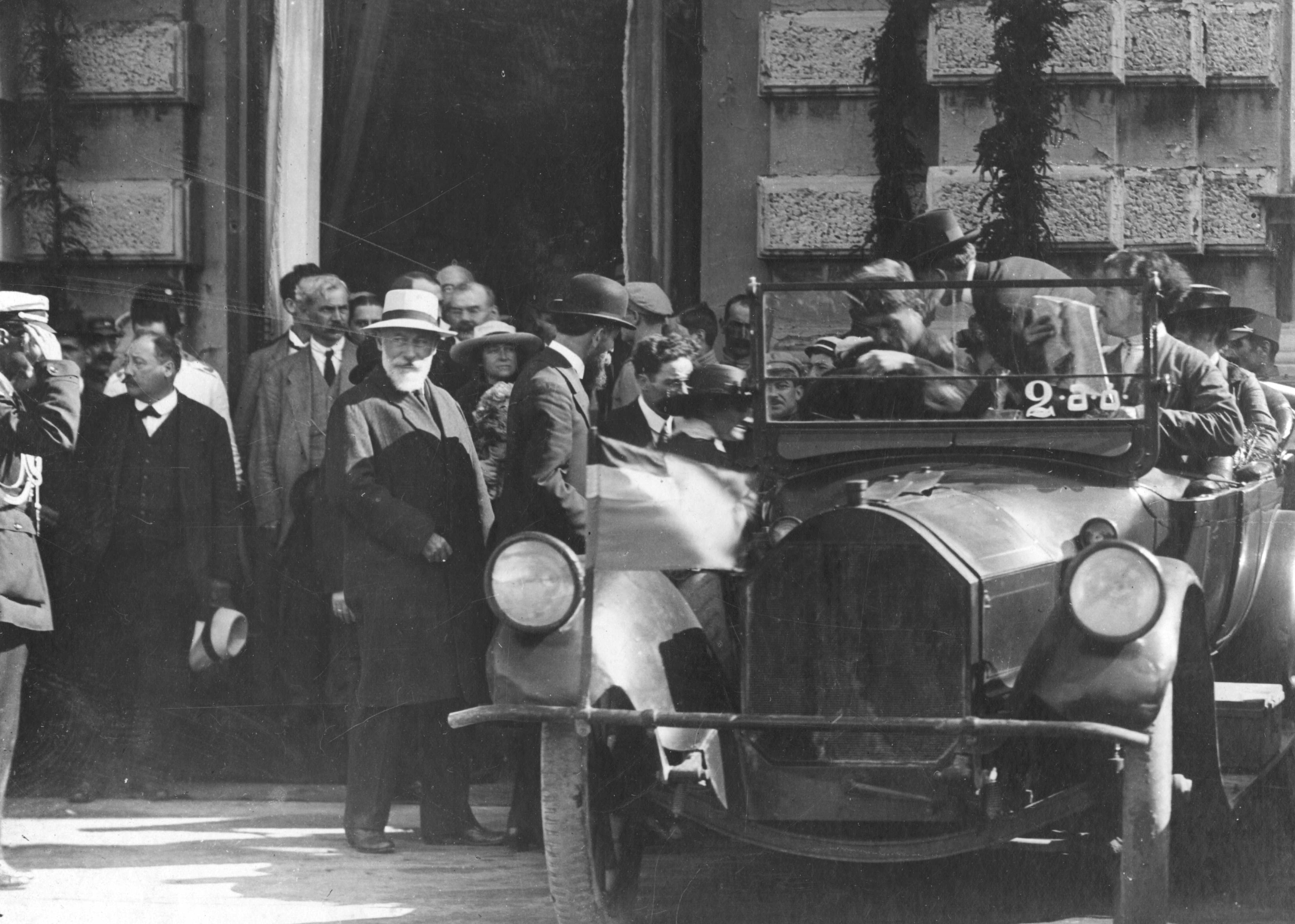
Noe Zhordania (man with white beard and wearing a white hat on the left side of the car), prime minister of the newly independent Georgia, attending a meeting of the Labour and Socialist International in 1920

After World War I, several attempts were made at a global level to refound the Second International that collapsed amidst national divisions in the war. The Vienna International formed in 1921 attempted to end the rift between reformist socialists, including social democrats; and revolutionary socialists, including communists, particularly the Mensheviks. However, a crisis soon erupted which involved the new country of Georgia led by a social democratic government led by president Noe Zhordania that had declared itself independent from Russia in 1918 and whose government had been endorsed by multiple social democratic parties. At the founding meeting of the Vienna International, the discussions were interrupted by the arrival of a telegram from Zhordania who said that Georgia was being invaded by Bolshevik Russia. Delegates attending the International's founding meeting were stunned, particularly the Bolshevik representative from Russia Mecheslav Bronsky, who refused to believe this and left the meeting to seek confirmation of this. Upon confirmation, Bronsky did not return to the meeting.

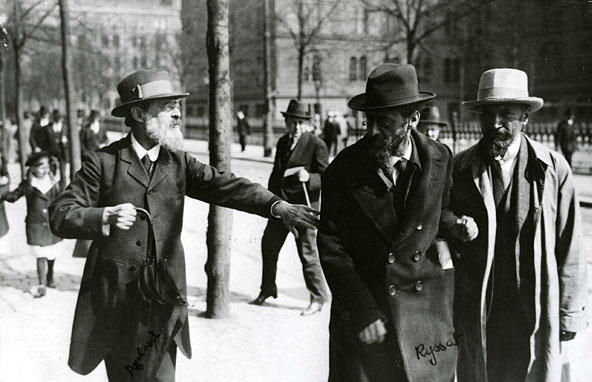
Menshevik leaders Pavel Axelrod, Julius Martov and Alexander Martinov in Stockholm

The overall response from the Vienna International was divided. The Mensheviks demanded that the Vienna International immediately condemn Russia's aggression against Georgia, but the majority as represented by German delegate Alfred Henke sought to exercise caution and said that the delegates should wait for confirmation. Russia's invasion of Georgia completely violated the non-aggression treaty signed between Lenin and Zhordania as well as violating Georgia's sovereignty by annexing Georgia directly into the Russian Soviet Federated Socialist Republic. Tensions between Bolsheviks and social democrats worsened with the Kronstadt rebellion. This was caused by unrest among leftists against the Bolshevik government in Russia. Russian social democrats distributed leaflets calling for a general strike against the Bolshevik regime and the Bolsheviks responded by forcefully repressing the rebels.

Relations between the social democratic movement and Bolshevik Russia descended into complete antagonism in response to the Russian famine of 1921 and the Bolsheviks' violent repression of opposition to their government. Multiple social democratic parties were disgusted with Russia's Bolshevik regime, particularly Germany's SPD and the Netherlands' Social Democratic Workers' Party (SDAP) that denounced the Bolsheviks for defiling socialism and declared that the Bolsheviks had "driven out the best of our comrades, thrown them into prison and put them to death". In May 1923, social democrats united to found their own international, the Labour and Socialist International (LSI), founded in Hamburg, Germany. The LSI declared that all its affiliated political parties would retain autonomy to make their own decisions regarding internal affairs of their countries, but that international affairs would be addressed by the LSI. The LSI addressed the issue of the rise of fascism by declaring the LSI to be anti-fascist. In response to the outbreak of the Spanish Civil War in 1936 between the democratically elected Republican government versus the authoritarian right-wing Nationalists led by Francisco Franco with the support of Fascist Italy and Nazi Germany, the Executive Committee of the LSI declared not only its support for the Spanish Republic, but also that it supported the Spanish government having the right to purchase arms to fight Franco's Nationalist forces. LSI-affiliated parties, including the British Labour Party, declared their support for the Spanish Republic. The LSI was criticized on the left for failing to put its anti-fascist rhetoric into action.

=== Great Depression era and World War II (1929–1945) ===
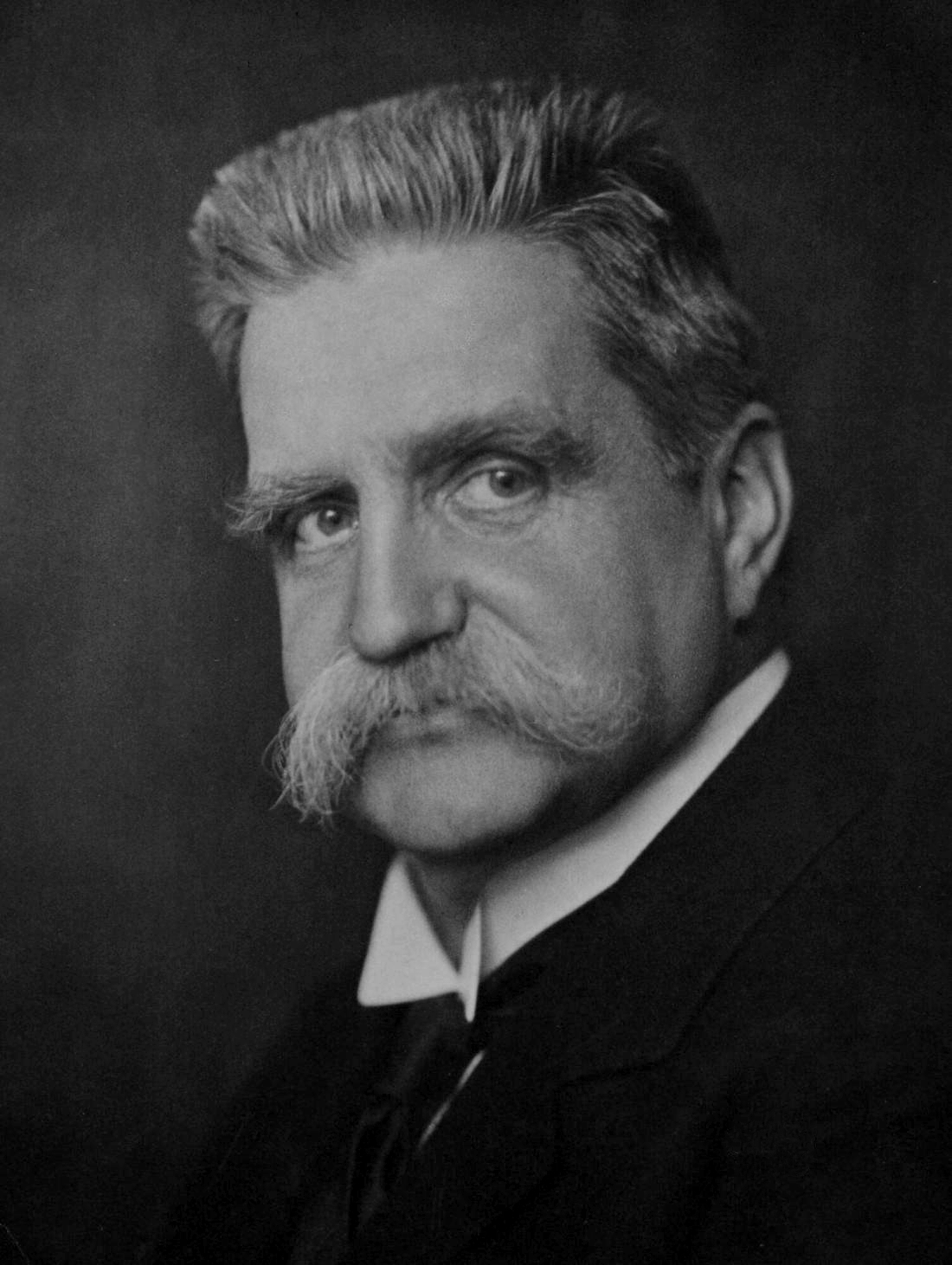
Hjalmar Branting, prime minister of Sweden (1921–1923, 1924–1925)

The stock market crash of 1929 that began an economic crisis in the United States that globally spread and became the Great Depression profoundly affected economic policy-making. The collapse of the gold standard and the emergence of mass unemployment resulted in multiple governments recognizing the need for macroeconomic state intervention to reduce unemployment as well as economic intervention to stabilize prices, a proto-Keynesianism that John Maynard Keynes himself would soon publicly endorse. Multiple social democratic parties declared the need for substantial investment in economic infrastructure projects to respond to unemployment and creating social control over currency flow. Furthermore, social democratic parties declared that the Great Depression demonstrated the need for substantial macroeconomic planning by the state while their free market opponents staunchly opposed this. Attempts by social democratic governments to achieve this were unsuccessful due to the ensuing political instability in their countries caused by the depression. The British Labour Party became internally split over said policies while Germany's SPD government did not have the time to implement such policies as Germany's politics degenerated into violent civil unrest pitting the left against the right in which the Nazi Party rose to power in January 1933 and violently dismantled parliamentary democracy for the next twelve years.

Hjalmar Branting, leader of the Swedish Social Democratic Party (SAP) from its founding to his death in 1925, asserted: "I believe that one benefits the workers so much more by forcing through reforms which alleviate and strengthen their position, than by saying that only a revolution can help them". A major development for social democracy was the victory of several social democratic parties in Scandinavia, particularly the SAP in the 1920 general election. Elected to a minority government, the SAP created a Socialization Committee that supported a mixed economy combining the best of private initiative with social ownership or control, supporting a substantial socialization "of all necessary natural resources, industrial enterprises, credit institutions, transportation and communication routes" that would be gradually transferred to the state. It permitted private ownership of the means of production outside of these areas.

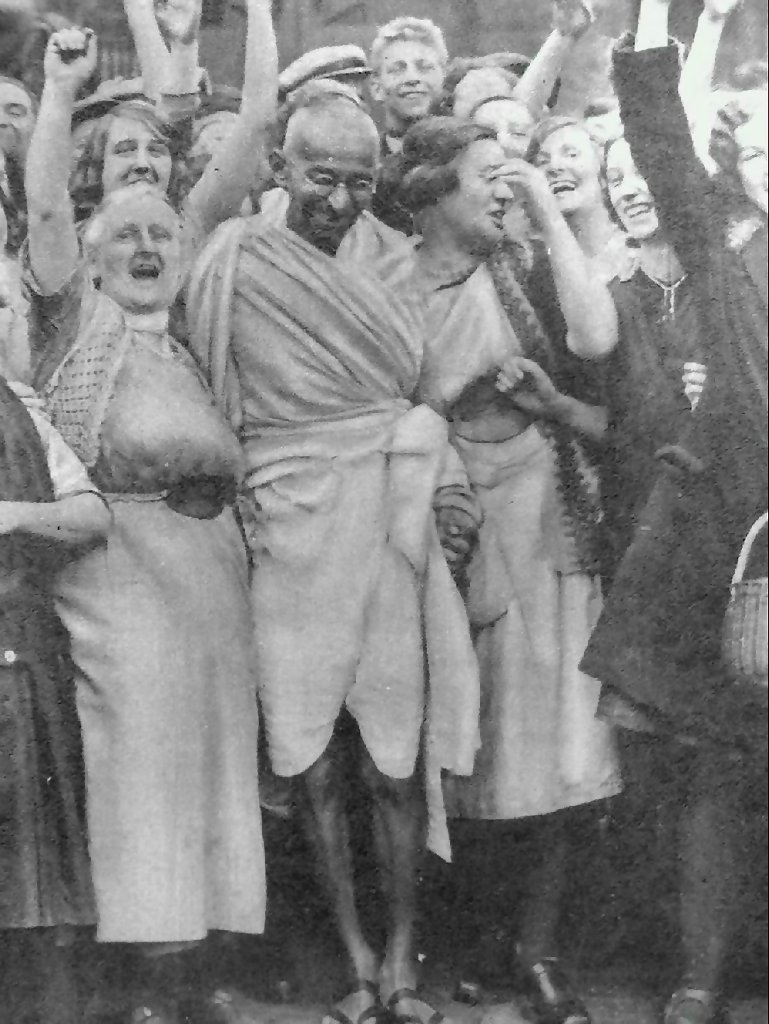
Mohandas Gandhi, here meeting with female textile workers in Britain, was a leadership figure of India's anti-colonial Indian National Congress, a social democratic party still active

In 1922, Ramsay MacDonald returned to the leadership of the Labour Party after his brief tenure in the Independent Labour Party. In the 1923 general election, the Labour Party won a plurality of seats and was elected as a minority government, but required assistance from the Liberal Party to achieve a majority in parliament. Opponents of Labour falsely accused the party of Bolshevik sympathies. Prime minister MacDonald responded to these allegations by stressing the party's commitment to reformist gradualism and openly opposing the radical wing in the party. MacDonald emphasized that the Labour minority government's first and foremost commitment was to uphold democratic and responsible government over all other policies. MacDonald emphasized this because he knew that any attempt to pass major socialist legislation in a minority government would endanger the new government as it would be opposed and blocked by the Conservatives and the Liberals, who together held a majority of seats. Labour had risen to power in the aftermath of Britain's severe recession of 1921–1922.

With the economy beginning to recover, British trade unions demanded that their wages be restored from the cuts they took in the recession. The trade unions soon became deeply dissatisfied with the MacDonald government and labour unrest and threat of strikes arose in transportation sector, including docks and railways. MacDonald viewed the situation as a crisis, consulting the unions in advance to warn them that his government would have to use strikebreakers if the situation continued. The anticipated clash between the government and the unions was averted, but the situation alienated the unions from the MacDonald government, whose most controversial action was having Britain recognize the Soviet Union in February 1924. The British conservative tabloid press, including the Daily Mail, used this to promote a red scare by claiming that the Labour government's recognition of the Soviet Union proved that Labour held pro-Bolshevik sympathies. Labour lost the 1924 general election and a Conservative government was elected. Although MacDonald faced multiple challenges to his leadership of the party, the Labour Party stabilized as a capable opposition to the Conservative government by 1927. MacDonald released a new political programme for the party titled Labour and the Nation (1928). Labour returned to government in 1929, but it soon had to deal with the economic catastrophe of the stock market crash of 1929.

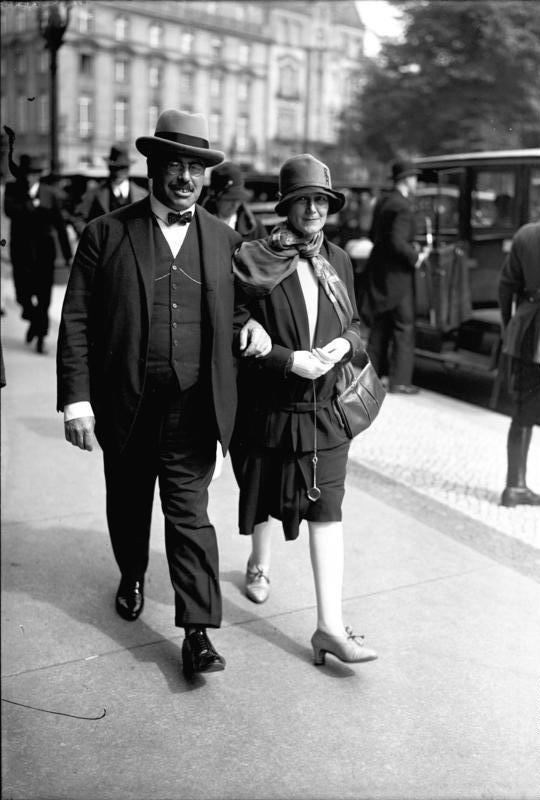
Rudolf Hilferding, a major figure and policymaker in the Social Democratic Party of Germany and the Czechoslovak Sopade

In the 1920s, SPD policymaker and Marxist Rudolf Hilferding proposed substantial policy changes in the SPD as well as influencing social democratic and socialist theory. Hilferding was an influential Marxian socialist both inside the social democratic movement and outside, with his pamphlet titled Imperialism influencing Lenin's own conception of imperialism in the 1910s. Prior to the 1920s, Hilferding declared that capitalism had evolved beyond what had been laissez-faire capitalism into what he called organized capitalism. Organized capitalism was based upon trusts and cartels controlled by financial institutions that could no longer make profit within their countries' national boundaries and therefore needed to export to survive, resulting in support for imperialism. Hilferding described that while early capitalism promoted itself as peaceful and based on free trade, the era of organized capitalism was aggressive and said that "in the place of humanity there came the idea of the strength and power of the state". He said that this had the consequence of creating effective collectivization within capitalism and had prepared the way for socialism.

Originally, Hilferding's vision of a socialism replacing organized capitalism was highly Kautskyan in assuming an either/or perspective and expecting a catastrophic clash between organized capitalism versus socialism. By the 1920s, Hilferding became an adherent to promoting a gradualist evolution of capitalism into socialism. He then praised organized capitalism for being a step towards socialism, saying at the SPD congress in 1927 that organised capitalism is nothing less than "the replacement of the capitalist principle of free competition by the socialist principle of planned production". He went on to say that "the problem is posed to our generation: with the help of the state, with the help of conscious social direction, to transform the economy organized and led by capitalists into an economy directed by the democratic state".

By the 1930s, social democracy became seen as overwhelmingly representing reformist socialism and supporting liberal democracy, influenced by Carlo Rosselli, an anti-fascist and social democrat in the liberal socialist tradition. Despite advocating reformism rather than revolution as means for socialism, those social democrats had supported political revolutions to establish liberal democracy such as in Russia and social democratic parties both in exile and in parliaments supported the forceful overthrow of fascist regimes such as in Germany, Italy and Spain. In the 1930s, the SPD began to transition away from revisionist Marxism towards liberal socialism. After the party was banned by the Nazis in 1933, the SPD acted in exile through Sopade. In 1934, the Sopade began to publish material that indicated that the SPD was turning towards liberal socialism. Curt Geyer, who was a prominent proponent of liberal socialism within the Sopade, declared that Sopade represented the tradition of Weimar Republic social democracy, liberal-democratic socialism and stated that the Sopade had held true to its mandate of traditional liberal principles combined with the political realism of socialism. Willy Brandt is a social democrat that has been identified as a liberal socialist.

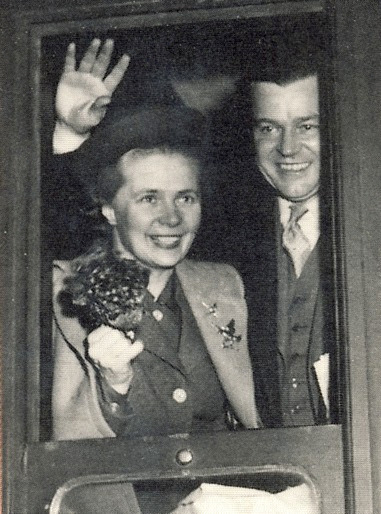
Alva Myrdal, a prominent figure in the Swedish Social Democratic Party in the 1930s and a pioneer in the development of the welfare state in Sweden

The only social democratic governments in Europe that remained by the early 1930s were in Scandinavia. In the 1930s, several Swedish social democratic leadership figures, including former Swedish prime minister and secretary and chairman of the Socialization Committee Rickard Sandler and Nils Karleby, rejected earlier SAP socialization policies pursued in the 1920s for being too extreme. Karleby and Sandler developed a new conception of social democracy known as the Nordic model which called for gradual socialization and redistribution of purchasing power, provision of educational opportunity and support of property rights. The Nordic model would permit private enterprise on the condition that it adheres to the principle that the resources it disposes are in reality public means and would create of a broad category of social welfare rights.

The new SAP government of 1932 replaced the previous government's universal commitment to a balanced budget with a Keynesian-like commitment which in turn was replaced with a balanced budget within a business cycle. Whereas the 1921–1923 SAP governments had run large deficits, the new SAP government reduced Sweden's budget deficit after a strong increase in state expenditure in 1933 and the resulting economic recovery. The government had planned to eliminate Sweden's budget deficit in seven years, but it took only three years to eliminate the deficit and Sweden had a budget surplus from 1936 to 1938. However, this policy was criticized because major unemployment still remained a problem in Sweden, even when the budget deficit had been eliminated.

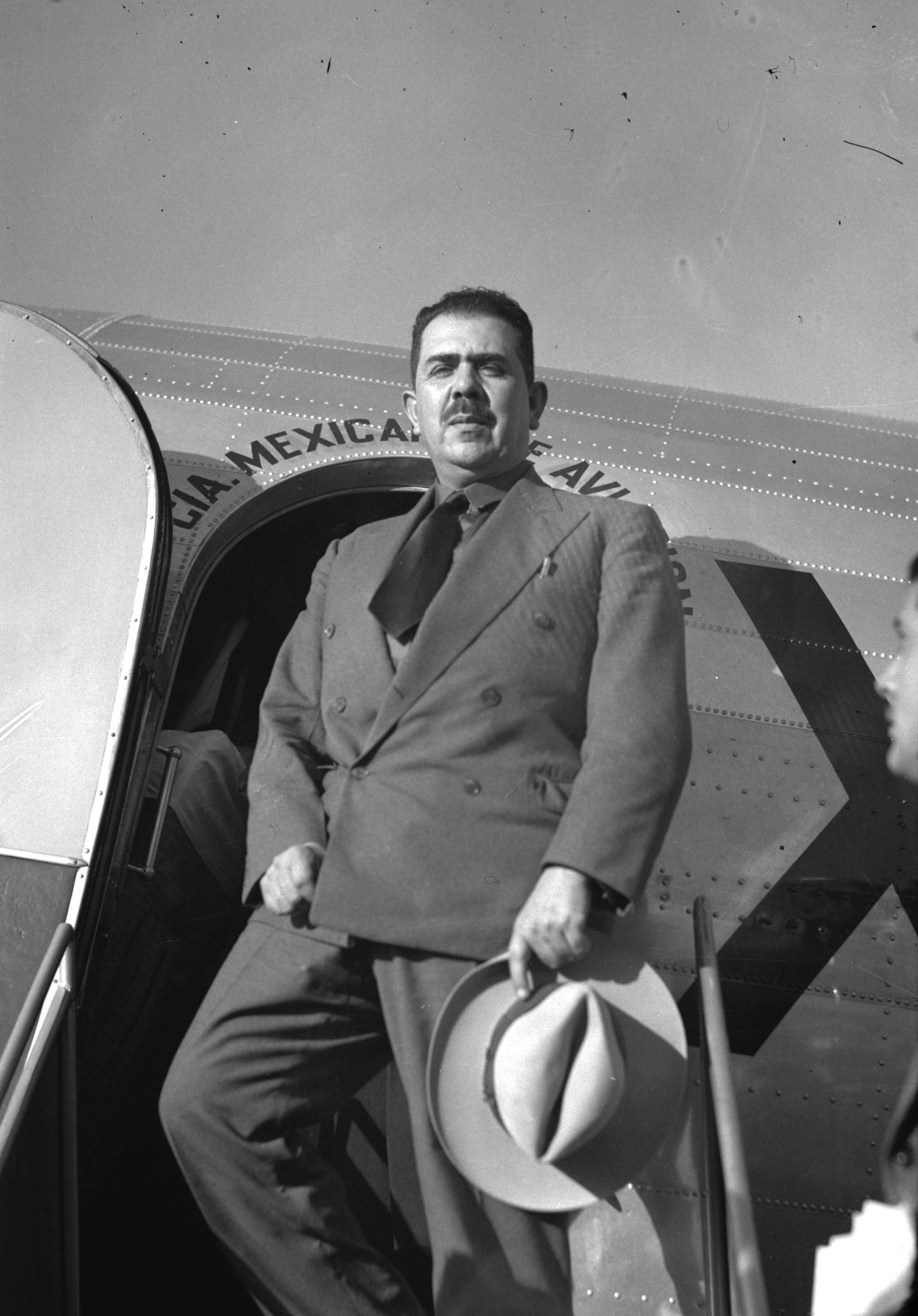
Lázaro Cárdenas, president of Mexico (1934–1940)

In the Americas, social democracy was rising as a major political force. In Mexico, several social democratic governments and presidents were elected from the 1920s to the 1930s. The most important Mexican social democratic government of this time was that led by president Lázaro Cárdenas and the Party of the Mexican Revolution, whose government initiated agrarian reform that broke up vast aristocratic estates and redistributed property to peasants. While deeply committed to social democracy, Cardenas was criticized by his left-wing opponents for being pro-capitalist due to his personal association with a wealthy family and for being corrupt due to his government's exemption from agrarian reform of the estate held by former Mexican president Álvaro Obregón. Political violence in Mexico escalated in the 1920s after the outbreak of the Cristero War in which far-right reactionary clerics staged a violent insurgency against the left-wing government that was attempting to institute secularization in Mexico.

Cardenas' government openly supported Spain's Republican government while opposing Francisco Franco's Nationalists during the Spanish Civil War and he staunchly asserted that Mexico was progressive and socialist, working with socialists of various types, including communists. Under Cárdenas, Mexico accepted refugees from Spain and communist dissident Leon Trotsky after Joseph Stalin expelled Trotsky and sought to have him and his followers killed. Cárdenas strengthened the rights of Mexico's labour movement, nationalized the property of foreign oil companies (which was later used to create PEMEX, Mexico's national petroleum company) and controversially supported peasants in their struggle against landlords by allowing them to form armed militias to fight the private armies of landlords in the country. Cárdenas' actions deeply outraged rightists and far-right reactionaries as there were fears that Mexico would once again descend into civil war. Subsequently, he stepped down from the Mexican presidency and supported the compromise presidential candidate Manuel Ávila Camacho, who held support from business interests, in order to avoid further antagonizing the right.

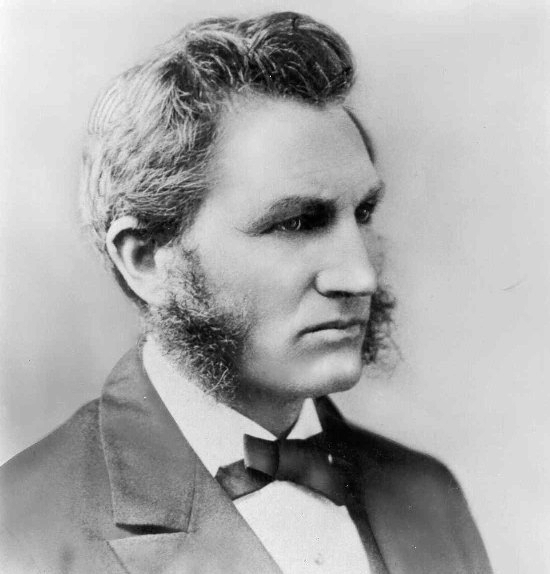
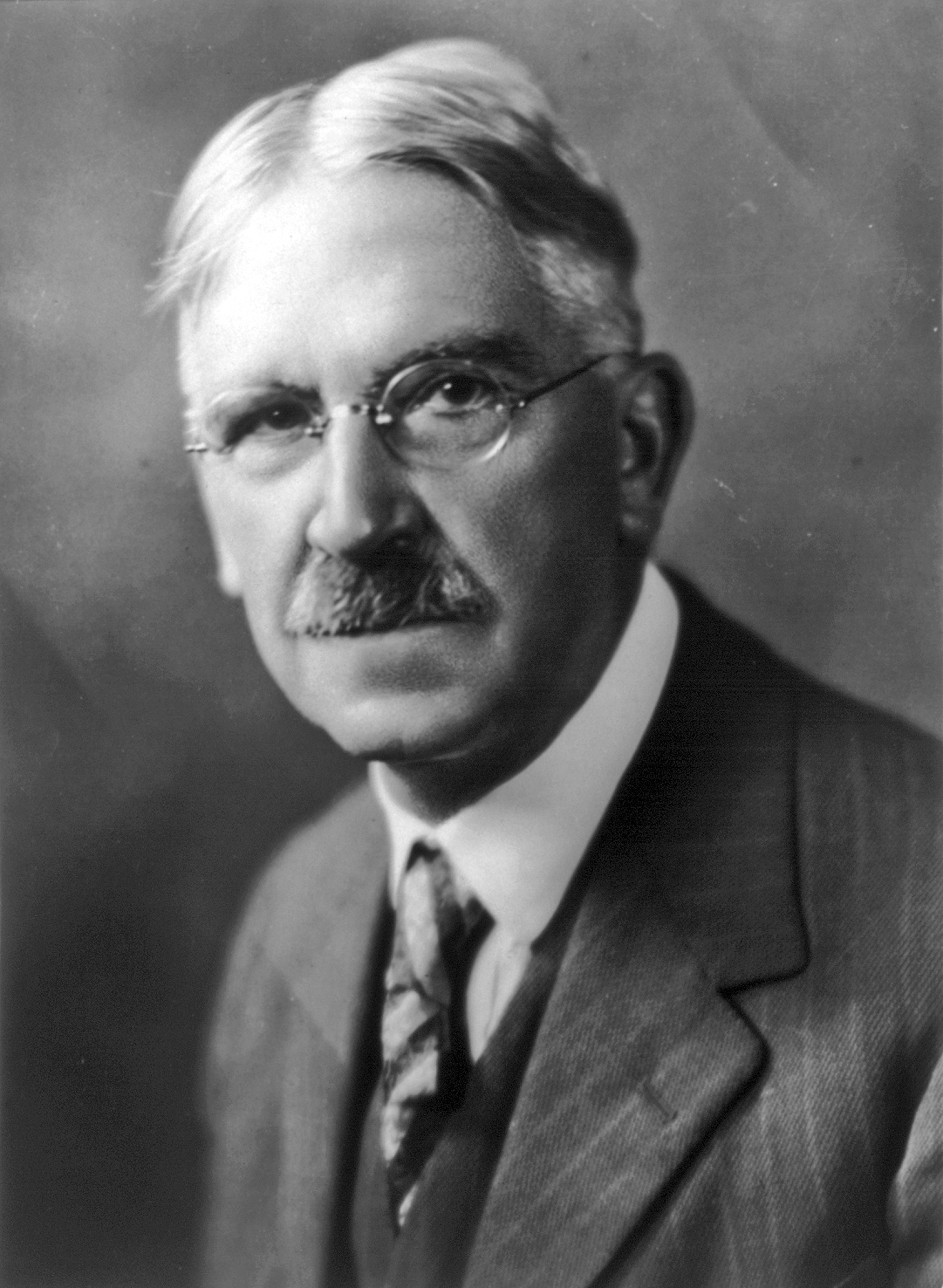
Herbert Croly, Lester Frank Ward and John Dewey (Note: Croly, one of the founders of modern liberalism in the United States, rejected the thesis that the liberal tradition in the United States was inhospitable to anti-capitalist alternatives and that the American liberal promise could be redeemed only by syndicalist reforms involving workplace democracy; Ward, whose critique of laissez-faire greatly influenced the development of the welfare state in the United States, of which he was a strong supporter; and Dewey, a progressive educator who advocated socialist methods to achieve liberal goals.)

Canada and the United States represent an unusual case in the Western world. While having a social democratic movement, both countries were not governed by a social democratic party at the federal level. In American politics, democratic socialism became more recently a synonym for social democracy due to social democratic policies being adopted by progressive intellectuals such as Herbert Croly, John Dewey and Lester Frank Ward as well as liberal politicians such as Franklin D. Roosevelt, Harry S. Truman and Woodrow Wilson, causing the New Deal coalition to be the main entity spearheading left-wing reforms of capitalism, rather than by socialists like elsewhere.

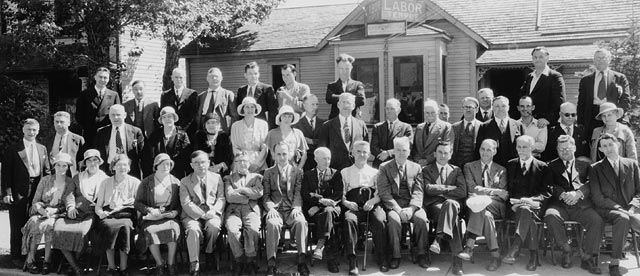
CCF founding meeting in 1933

Similarly, the welfare state in Canada was developed by the Liberal Party of Canada. Nonetheless, the social democratic Co-operative Commonwealth Federation (CCF), the precursor to the social democratic New Democratic Party (NDP), had significant success in provincial Canadian politics. In 1944, the Saskatchewan CCF formed the first socialist government in North America and its leader Tommy Douglas is known for having spearheaded the adoption of Canada's nationwide system of universal healthcare called Medicare. The NDP obtained its best federal electoral result to date in the 2011 Canadian general election, becoming for the first time the Official Opposition until the 2015 Canadian general election.

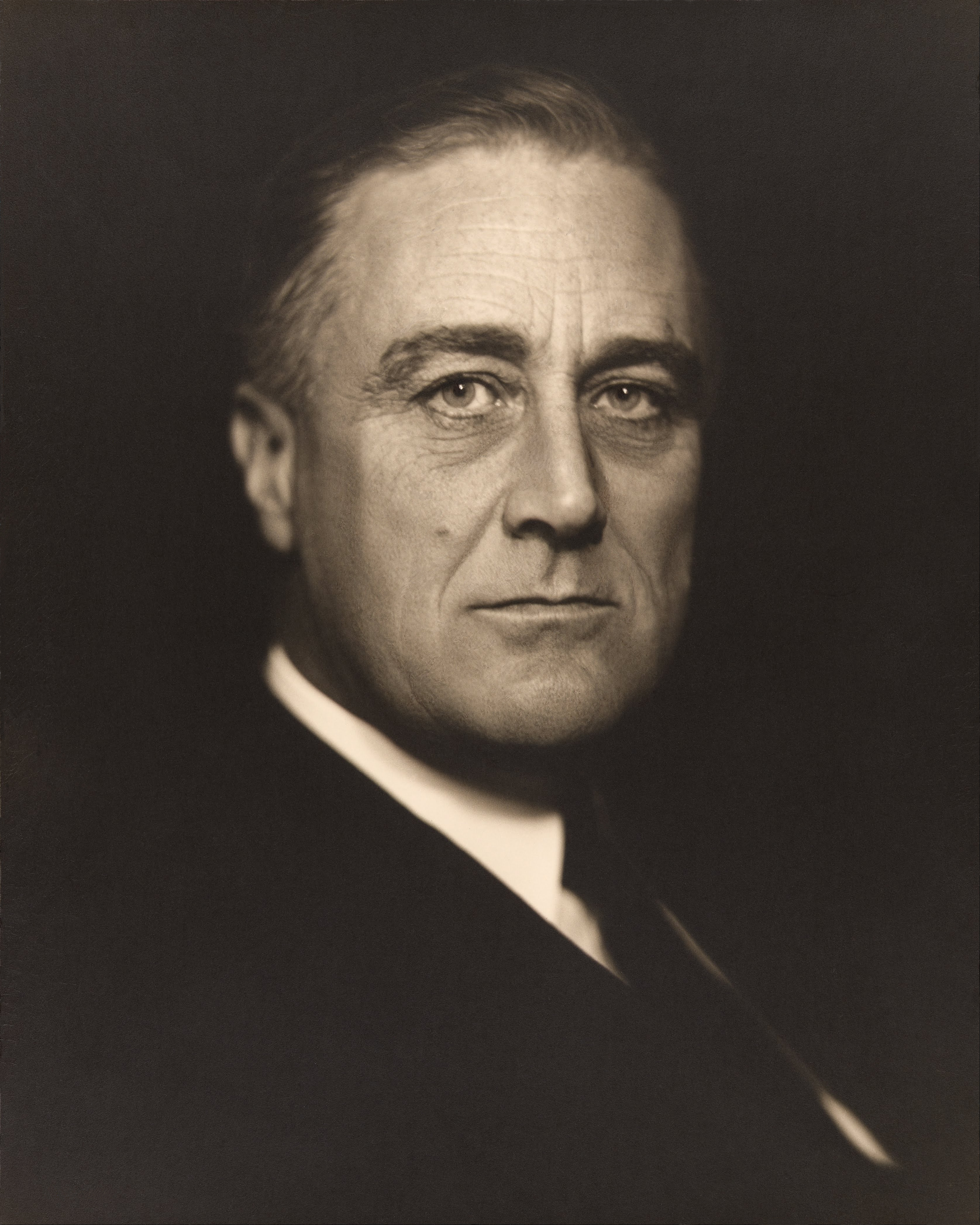
Franklin D. Roosevelt, president of the United States (1933–1945), whose New Deal policies were inspired by social democracy

Although well within the liberal and modern liberal American tradition, Franklin D. Roosevelt's more radical, extensive and populist Second New Deal challenged the business community. Conservative Democrats led by Roman Catholic politician and former presidential candidate Al Smith fought back along with the American Liberty League, savagely attacking Roosevelt and equating him and his policies with Karl Marx and Vladimir Lenin. This allowed Roosevelt to isolate his opponents and identify them with the wealthy landed interests that opposed the New Deal, strengthening Roosevelt's political capital and becoming one of the key causes of his landslide victory in the 1936 presidential election. By contrast, already with the passage of the National Labor Relations Act of 1935, also known as the Wagner Act, "the most significant and radical bill of the period", there was an upsurge in labour insurgency and radical organization. Those labour unions were energized by the passage of the Wagner Act, signing up millions of new members and becoming a major backer of Roosevelt's presidential campaigns in 1936, 1940 and 1944.

Conservatives feared the New Deal meant socialism and Roosevelt privately noted in 1934 that the "old line press harps increasingly on state socialism and demands the return to the good old days". In his 1936 Madison Square Garden speech, Roosevelt pledged to continue the New Deal and criticized those who were putting their greed, personal gain and politics over national economic recovery from the Great Depression. In the speech, Roosevelt also described forces which he labeled as "the old enemies of peace: business and financial monopoly, speculation, reckless banking, class antagonism, sectionalism, war profiteering" and went on to claim that these forces were united against his candidacy, that "[t]hey are unanimous in their hate for me – and I welcome their hatred". In 1941, Roosevelt advocated freedom from want and freedom from fear as part of his Four Freedoms goal. In 1944, Roosevelt called for a Second Bill of Rights that would have expanded many social and economic rights for the workers such as the right for every American to have access to a job and universal healthcare. This economic bill of rights was taken up as a mantle by the People's Program for 1944 of the Congress of Industrial Organizations, a platform that has been described as "aggressive social democratic" for the post-war era.

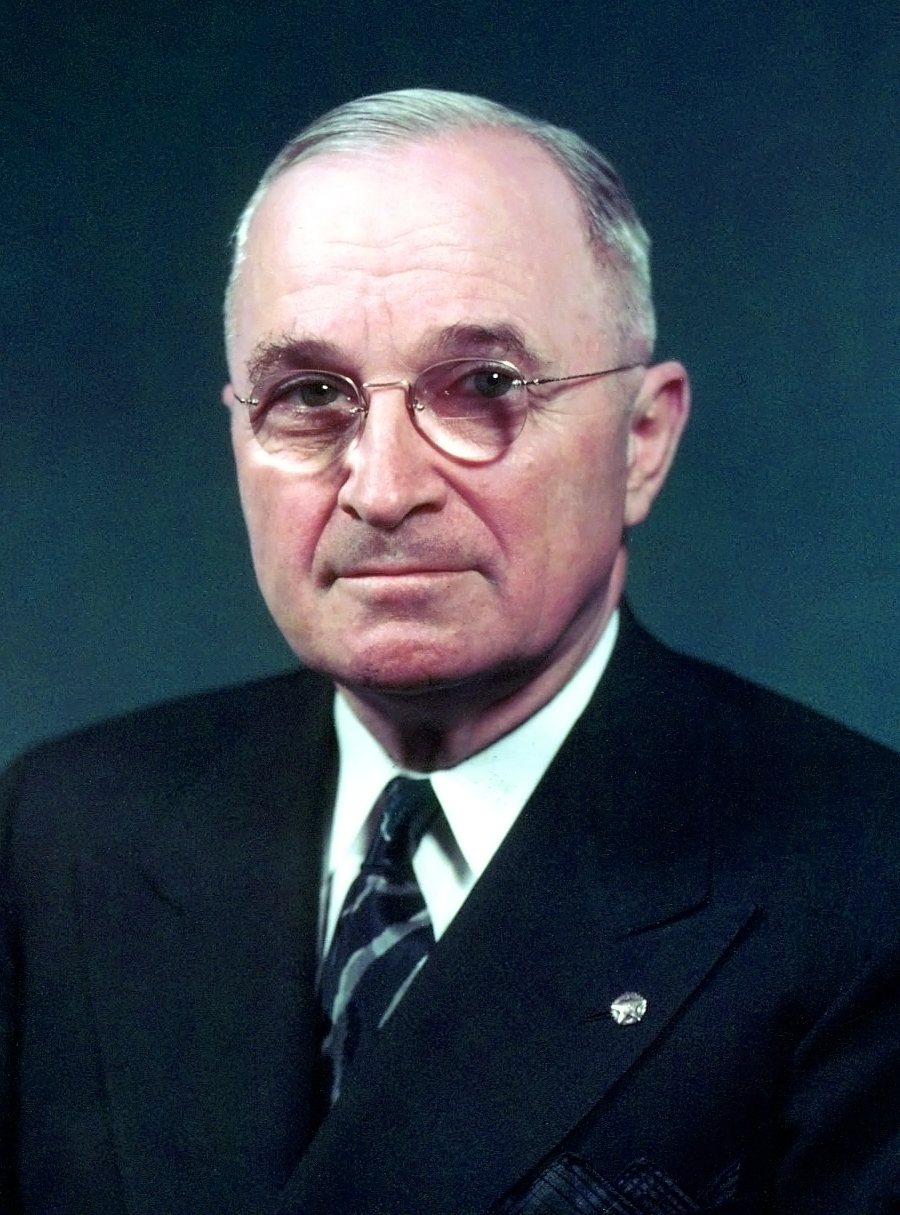
Harry S. Truman, president of the United States (1945–1953), whose Fair Deal was a continuation and expansion of the New Deal

While criticized by many leftists and hailed by mainstream observers as having saved American capitalism from a socialist revolution, many communists, socialists and social democrats admired Roosevelt and supported the New Deal, including politicians and activists of European social democratic parties such as the British Labour Party and the French Section of the Workers' International. After initially rejecting the New Deal as part of its ultra-leftist sectarian Third Period that equated social democracy with fascism, the Communist International had to concede and admit the merits of Roosevelt's New Deal by 1935. Although critical of Roosevelt, arguing that he never embraced "our essential [conception of] socialism", Socialist Party leader Norman Thomas viewed Roosevelt's program for reform of the economic system as far more reflective of the Socialist Party platform than of the Democratic Party's platform. Thomas acknowledged that Roosevelt built a welfare state by adopting "ideas and proposals formerly called 'socialist' and voiced in our platforms beginning with Debs in 1900".

Harry S. Truman, Roosevelt's successor after his death on 12 April 1945, called for universal health care as part of the Fair Deal, an ambitious set of proposals to continue and expand the New Deal, but strong and determined conservative opposition from both parties in Congress blocked such policy from being enacted. The details of the plan became the Wagner-Murray-Dingell Bill, but they were never rolled out because the bill never even received a vote in Congress (Note: On 24 April 1949, the American Medical Association denounced this health program. On 25 April 1949, the Murray-Dingell omnibus health legislation (S.1679 and H.R. 4312) was introduced into the Senate and the House, but the Congress adjourned in October 1949 without acting on this bill.) and Truman later described it as the greatest disappointment of his presidency. The British Labour Party released an "exultant statement" upon Truman's upset victory. It stated that "[w]e are not suggesting that Mr. Truman is a Socialist. It is precisely because he is not that his adumbration of these policies is significant. They show that the failure of capitalism to serve the common man ... is not, after all, something we invented ... to exasperate Mr. Churchill". Truman argued that socialism is a "scare word" used by Republicans and "the patented trademark of the special interest lobbies" to refer to "almost anything that helps all the people".

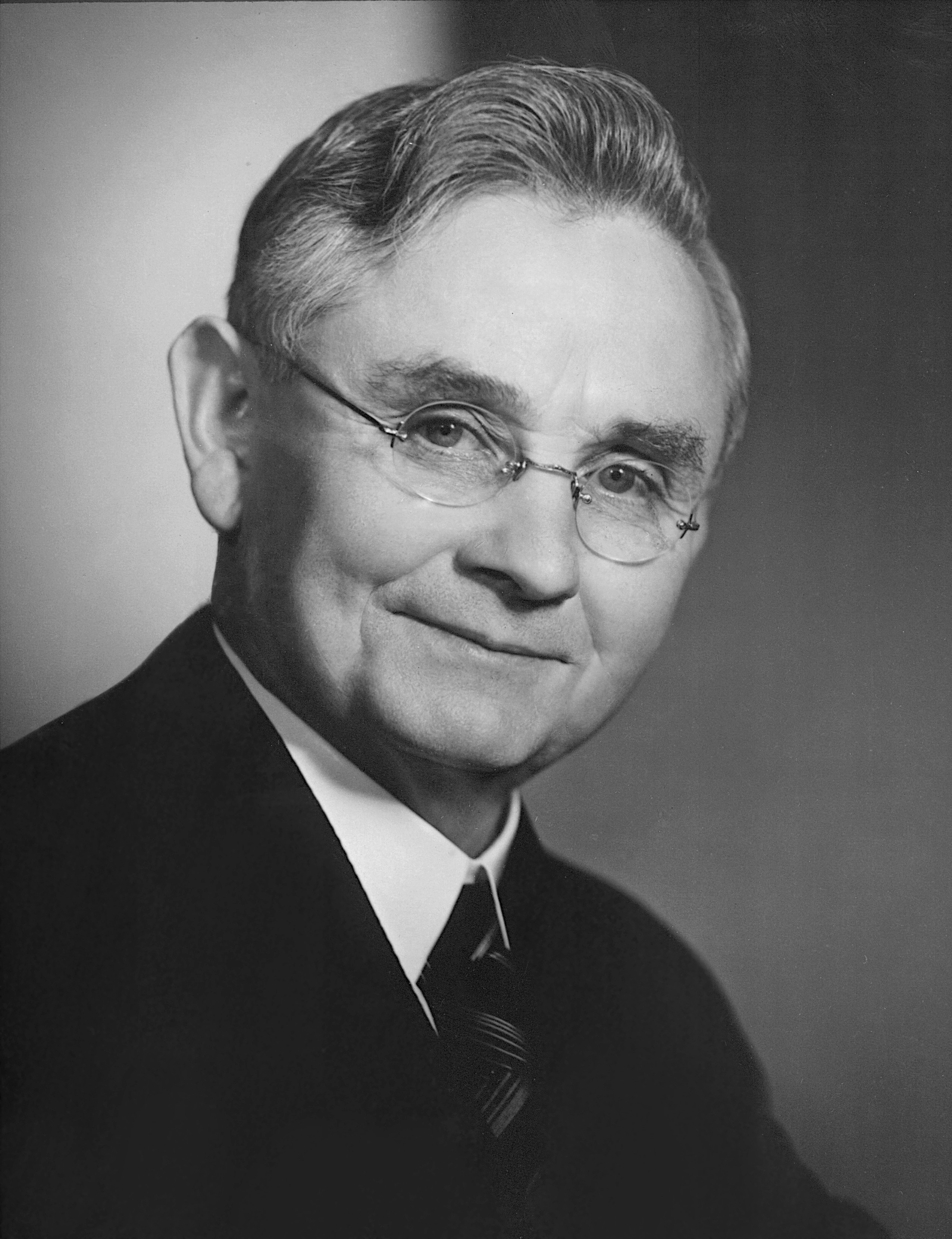
Michael Joseph Savage, prime minister of New Zealand (1935–1940) and architect of New Zealand's Social Security Act 1938

In Oceania, Michael Joseph Savage of the New Zealand Labour Party became prime minister on 6 December 1935, marking the beginning of Labour's first term in office. The new government quickly set about implementing a number of significant reforms, including a reorganization of the social welfare system and the creation of the state housing scheme. Workers benefited from the introduction of the forty hour week and legislation making it easier for unions to negotiate on their behalf. Savage was highly popular with the working classes and his portrait could be found on the walls of many houses around the country. At this time, the Labour Party pursued an alliance with the Māori Rātana movement. Meanwhile, the opposition attacked the Labour Party's more left-wing policies and accused it of undermining free enterprise and hard work. The year after Labour's first win, the Reform Party and the United Party took their coalition to the next step, agreeing to merge with each other. The combined organization was named the National Party and would be Labour's main rival in future years. Labour also faced opposition from within its ranks. While the Labour Party had been explicitly socialist at its inception, it had been gradually drifting away from its earlier radicalism. The death of the party's former leader, the so-called "doctrinaire" Harry Holland, had marked a significant turning point in the party's history. However, some within the party were displeased about the changing focus of the party, most notably John A. Lee, whose views were a mixture of socialism and social credit theory, emerged as a vocal critic of the party's leadership, accusing it of behaving autocratically and of betraying the party's rank and file. After a long and bitter dispute, Lee was expelled from the party, establishing his own breakaway Democratic Labour Party.

Savage died in 1940 and was replaced by Peter Fraser, who became Labour's longest-serving prime minister. Fraser is best known as New Zealand's leader for most of World War II. In the post-war period, ongoing shortages and industrial problems cost Labour considerable popularity and the National Party under Sidney Holland gained ground, although Labour was able to win the 1943 and 1946 general elections. Eventually, Labour was defeated in the 1949 general election. Fraser died shortly afterwards and was replaced by Walter Nash, the long-serving minister of finance.

== Mid-to-late 20th century and early 21st century ==
=== Cold War era and post-war consensus (1945–1973) ===
After World War II, a new international organization called the Socialist International was formed in 1951 to represent social democracy and democratic socialism in opposition to Soviet-style socialism. In the founding Frankfurt Declaration on 3 July, its Aims and Tasks of Democratic Socialism: Declaration of the Socialist International denounced both capitalism and Bolshevism, better known as Marxism–Leninism and referred to as Communism—criticizing the latter in articles 7, 8, 9 and 10.

The rise of Keynesianism in the Western world during the Cold War influenced the development of social democracy. The attitude of social democrats towards capitalism changed as a result of the rise of Keynesianism. Capitalism was acceptable to social democrats only if capitalism's typical crises could be prevented and if mass unemployment could be averted, therefore Keynesianism was believed to be able to provide this. Social democrats came to accept the market for reasons of efficiency and endorsed Keynesianism as that was expected to reconcile democracy and capitalism. According to Michael Harrington, this represented a compromise between capitalism and socialism. While the post-war period of social democracy saw several social democratic parties renouncing orthodox Marxism, they did not lose their revisionist Marxist character, nor did they stop looking at Marx for inspiration such as in the form of Marxist humanism. However, Marxism was associated with the Marxism–Leninism as practiced in the Soviet Union and the Eastern Bloc which social democracy rejected and regarded as "falsely claim[ing] a share in the Socialist tradition. In fact it has distorted that tradition beyond recognition". Rather than a close or dogmatic Marxism, social democracy favours an open and "critical spirit of Marxism".

For Harrington, social democracy believes that capitalism be reformed from within and that gradually a socialist economy will be created. The "social democratic compromise" involving Keynesianism led to a capitalism under socialist governments that would generate such growth that the surplus would make possible "an endless improvement of the quality of social life". According to Harrington, the socialists had become the "normal party of government" in Europe while their "conservative opponents were forced to accept measures they had once denounced on principle". Although this socialist pragmatism led in theory and practice to utopias hostile to one another, they all shared basic assumptions. This "social democratic compromise" goes back to the 1930s, when there was "a ferment in the movement, a break with the old either/or Kautskyan tradition, a new willingness to develop socialist programs that could work with and modify capitalism, but that fell far short of a "revolutionary" transformation".

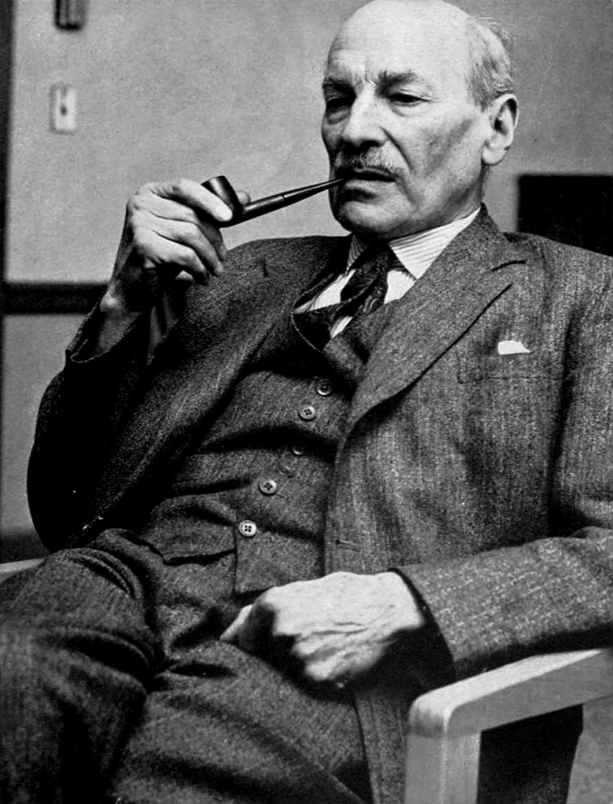
Clement Attlee, prime minister of the United Kingdom (1945–1951)

After the 1945 general election, a Labour government was formed by Clement Attlee. Attlee immediately began a program of major nationalization of the economy. From 1945 to 1951, the Labour government nationalized the Bank of England, civil aviation, cable and wireless, coal, transport, electricity, gas and iron and steel. This policy of major nationalizations gained support from the left faction within the Labour Party that saw the nationalizations as achieving the transformation of Britain from a capitalist to socialist economy.

The Labour government's nationalizations were staunchly condemned by the opposition Conservative Party. The Conservatives defended private enterprise and accused the Labour government of intending to create a Soviet-style centrally planned socialist state. Despite these accusations, the Labour government's three Chancellors of the Exchequer, namely Hugh Dalton, Stafford Cripps and Hugh Gaitskell, all opposed Soviet-style central planning. Initially, there were strong direct controls by the state in the economy that had already been implemented by the British government during World War II, but after the war these controls gradually loosened under the Labour government and were eventually phased out and replaced by Keynesian demand management. In spite of opposition by the Conservatives to the nationalizations, all of the nationalizations except for that of coal and iron soon became accepted in a national post-war consensus on the economy that lasted until the Thatcher era in the late 1970s, when the national consensus turned towards support of privatization.

The Labour Party lost the 1951 general election and a Conservative government was formed. There were early major critics of the nationalization policy within the Labour Party in the 1950s. In The Future of Socialism (1956), British social democratic theorist Anthony Crosland argued that socialism should be about the reforming of capitalism from within. Crosland claimed that the traditional socialist programme of abolishing capitalism on the basis of capitalism inherently causing immiseration had been rendered obsolete by the fact that the post-war Keynesian capitalism had led to the expansion of affluence for all, including full employment and a welfare state. He claimed that the rise of such an affluent society had resulted in class identity fading and as a consequence socialism in its traditional conception as then supported by the British Labour Party was no longer attracting support. Crosland claimed that the Labour Party was associated in the public's mind as having "a sectional, traditional, class appeal" that was reinforced by bickering over nationalization. He argued that in order for the Labour Party to become electable again it had to drop its commitment to nationalization and to stop equating nationalization with socialism. Instead of this, Crosland claimed that a socialist programme should be about support of social welfare, redistribution of wealth and "the proper dividing line between the public and private spheres of responsibility". In post-war Germany, the SPD endorsed a similar policy on nationalizations to that of the British Labour government. SPD leader Kurt Schumacher declared that the SPD was in favour of nationalizations of key industrial sectors of the economy such as banking and credit, insurance, mining, coal, iron, steel, metal-working and all other sectors that were identified as monopolistic or cartelized.

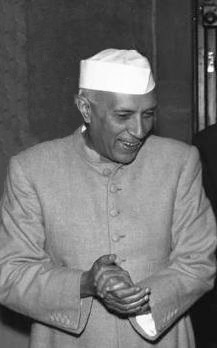
Jawaharlal Nehru, the first prime minister of India (1947–1964)

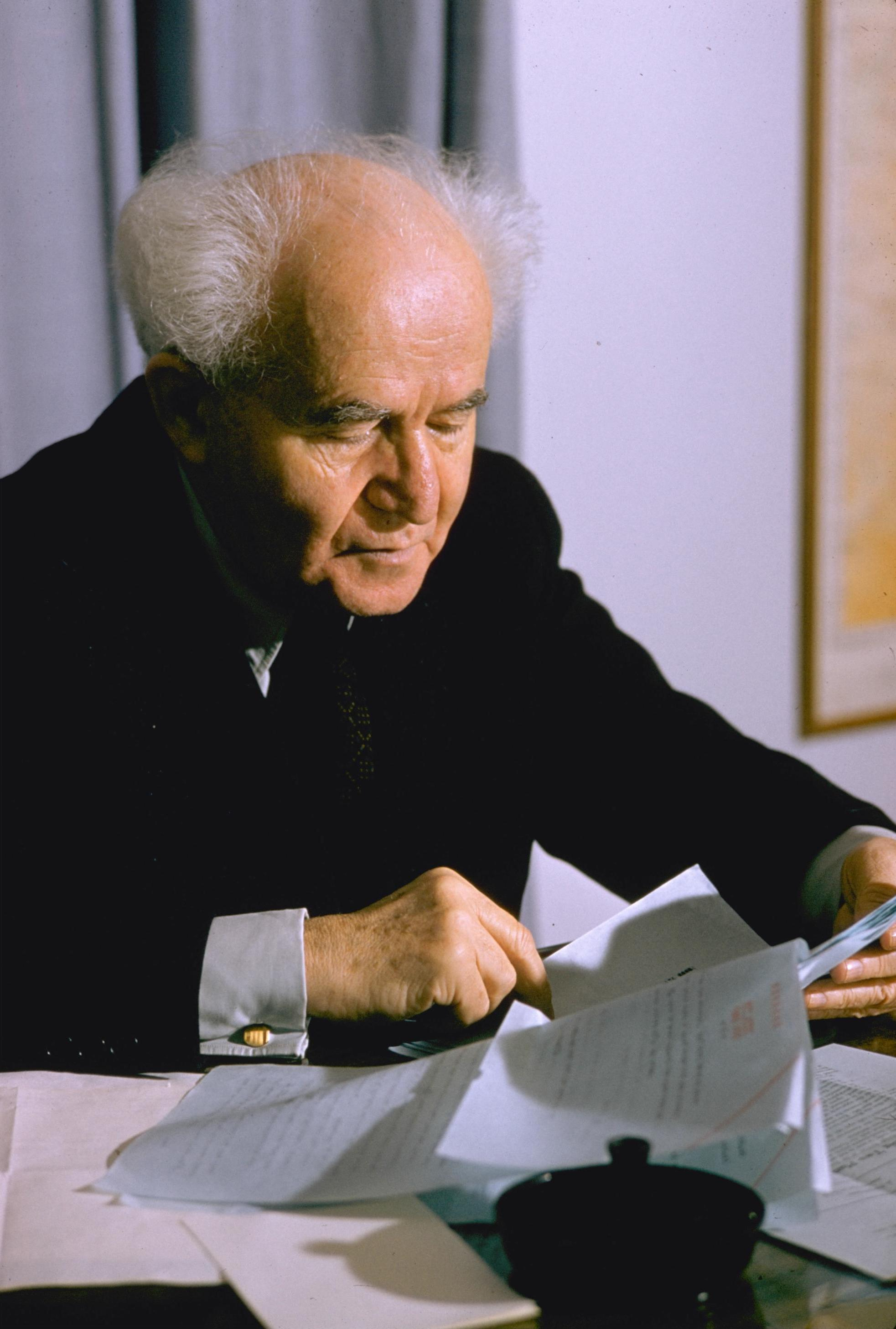
David Ben-Gurion, the first prime minister of Israel (1948–1954, 1955–1963)

Upon becoming a sovereign state in 1947, India elected the social democratic Indian National Congress into government, with its leader Jawaharlal Nehru becoming the Indian prime minister. Upon his election as prime minister, Nehru declared: "In Europe, we see many countries have advanced very far on the road to socialism. I am not referring to the communist countries but to those which may be called parliamentary, social democratic countries". While in power, Nehru's government emphasized state-guided national development of India and took inspiration from social democracy, although India's newly formed Planning Commission also took inspiration from post-1949 China's agricultural policies. The social democratic Sri Lanka Freedom Party dominated post-independence politics in Sri Lanka too, practising secular government and affiliation to the Non-Aligned movement. A social democratic movement also emerged in Pakistan, in particular All Pakistan Awami Muslim League, founded in 1949 in Dhaka, then East Pakistan, which, under the leadership of Sheikh Mujibur Rahman, led the movement for Bangladesh's independence in 1971 and won its first democratic elections in 1973, before being overthrown in a military coup in 1975.

In 1949, the newly independent and sovereign state of Israel elected the social democratic Mapai. The party sought the creation of a grassroots mixed economy based on cooperative ownership of the means of production via the kibbutz system while rejecting nationalization of the means of production. The kibbutz are producer cooperatives which have flourished in Israel through government assistance.

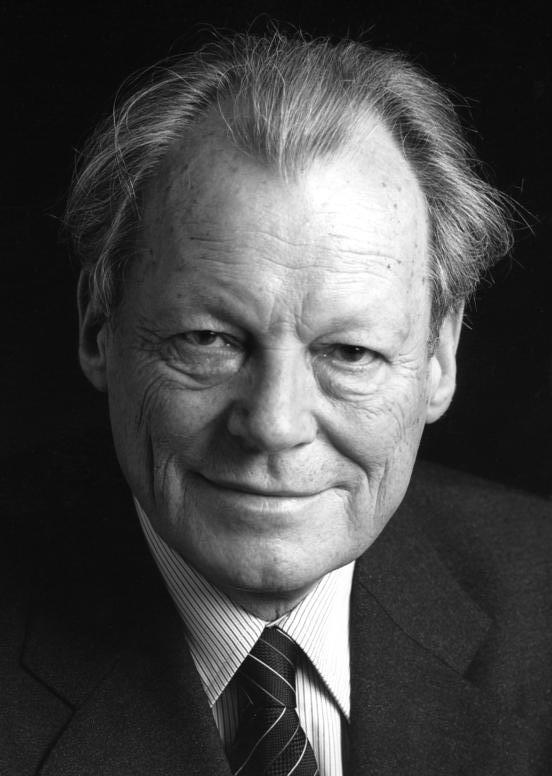
Willy Brandt, Chancellor of Germany (1969–1974)

In 1959, the SPD instituted a major policy review with the Godesberg Program. The Godesberg Program eliminated the party's remaining orthodox Marxist policies and the SPD redefined its ideology as freiheitlicher Sozialismus (liberal socialism). With the adoption of the Godesberg Program, the SPD renounced orthodox Marxist determinism and classism. The SPD replaced it with an ethical socialism based on humanism and emphasized that the party was democratic, pragmatic and reformist. The most controversial decision of the Godesberg Program was its declaration stating that private ownership of the means of production "can claim protection by society as long as it does not hinder the establishment of social justice".

By accepting free-market principles, the SPD argued that a truly free market would in fact have to be a regulated market not to degenerate into oligarchy. This policy also meant the endorsement of Keynesian economic management, social welfare and a degree of economic planning. Some argue that this was an abandonment of the classical conception of socialism as involving the replacement of the capitalist economic system. It declared that the SPD "no longer considered nationalization the major principle of a socialist economy but only one of several (and then only the last) means of controlling economic concentration of power of key industries" while also committing the SPD to an economic stance which promotes "as much competition as possible, as much planning as necessary". The decision to abandon the traditional anti-capitalist policy angered many in the SPD who had supported it.

After these changes, the SPD enacted the two major pillars of what would become the modern social democratic program, namely making the party a people's party rather than a party solely representing the working class and abandoning remaining Marxist policies aimed at destroying capitalism and replacing them with policies aimed at reforming capitalism. The Godesberg Program divorced its conception of socialism from Marxism, declaring that democratic socialism in Europe was "rooted in Christian ethics, humanism, and classical philosophy". The Godesberg Program has been seen as involving the final victory of the reformist agenda of Eduard Bernstein over the orthodox Marxist agenda of Karl Kautsky. The Godesberg Program was a major revision of the SPD's policies and gained attention from beyond Germany. At the time of its adoption, the stance on the Godesberg Program in neighbouring France was not uniform. While the French Section of the Workers' International was divided on the Godesberg Program, the Unified Socialist Party denounced the Godesberg Program as a renunciation of socialism and an opportunistic reaction to the SPD's electoral defeats.

The social democracy practiced by the Singaporean People's Action Party (PAP) during its first few decades in power (from 1959) were of a pragmatic kind, characterized by its rejection of nationalization. Despite this, the PAP still claimed to be a socialist party, pointing out its regulation of the private sector, state intervention in the economy and social policies as evidence of this. The Singaporean prime minister Lee Kuan Yew also stated that he has been influenced by the democratic socialist British Labour Party. Originally, there was infighting between moderates and radicals, including a left-wing and communist wing in the party which saw many imprisoned. While being the most right-wing of the Singaporean parties, the party has been described as centre-left and at times adopted a left tack in certain areas in order to remain electorally dominant.

In the US, economist John Kenneth Galbraith has been described as an "American liberal but European social democrat". For Galbraith, "it was possible to see social democracy as fulfilling its promise to be the extension and successor of liberalism" because "it sought to universalize the benefits of Western societies to all their citizens" and therefore "to make their economies work in the public interest". John F. Kennedy has been called "the first Keynesian president" and socialists such as Michael Harrington were called to assist the Kennedy administration's New Frontier and the Johnson administration's War on Poverty and Great Society social programs during the 1960s. Socialists such as A. Philip Randolph, Bayard Rustin and Martin Luther King Jr. also played important roles in the civil rights movement. The Social Democrats, USA (SDUSA), an association of reformist democratic socialists and social democrats, was founded in 1972. The Socialist Party had stopped running independent presidential candidates and begun reforming itself towards Keynesian social democracy. Consequently, the party's name was changed because it had confused the public. With the name change in place, the SDUSA clarified its vision to Americans who confused social democracy with authoritarian socialism and communism in the form of Marxism–Leninism, harshly opposed by the SDUSA.

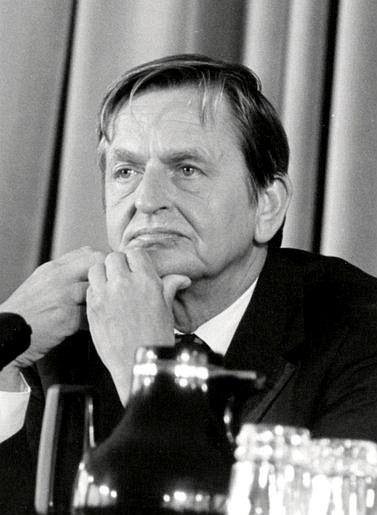
Olof Palme, prime minister of Sweden (1969–1976, 1982–1986)

During the 1970s, the Swedish Rehn–Meidner model allowed capitalists who were owning highly productive and efficient firms to retain excess profits at the expense of the firms' workers, exacerbating income inequality and causing workers in these firms to agitate for a share of the profits in the 1970s. At the same time, women working in the public sector also began to assert pressure for better wages. Under the leadership of "revolutionary reformist" and self-described democratic socialist prime minister Olof Palme, economist Rudolf Meidner established in 1976 a study committee that came up with a proposal, called the Meidner Plan. It entailed the transferring of the excess profits into investment funds controlled by the workers in the efficient firms, with the intention that the firms would create further employment and pay more workers higher wages rather than unduly increasing the wealth of company owners and managers. Earlier in the 1960s, Einar Gerhardsen established a planning agency and tried to establish a planned economy.

In 1982, Sweden's Social Democratic government adopted the Meidner Plan of Meidner to pursue a gradualist socialist agenda to first pursue the enhancement of political democracy and citizenship; second, to pursue entrenching social rights; and third, to then be able to implement economic democracy and social ownership. The plan focused on a twenty percent annual taxation of private enterprise to be used to create investment funds that were to be owned collectively by employees. Meidner stated that his plan was a gradualist socialism that would result in wage-earners gaining a controlling share in their enterprises within twenty-five to fifty years. The Meidner Plan was cancelled after the Social Democrats were defeated in the 1991 general election to a conservative government that scrapped the plan. Capitalists and conservatives had immediately denounced this proposal as "creepy socialism" and launched an unprecedented opposition and smear campaign against it, including the threat of calling off the class compromise established in the 1938 Saltsjöbaden Agreement.

Other social democratic parties and movements in this period included Barbados' Barbados Labour Party, established in 1938 and the ruling party for many of the years after independence in 1951, under the leadership of Grantley Herbert Adams; South Korea's Hyukshinkye (anti-communist left) movement and Progressive Party (1956); Japan's Democratic Socialist Party (1960); and Pakistan's Pakistan People's Party (1967), which led civil opposition to the country's military rulers and was in power during most of Pakistan's democratic periods.

=== Response to neoliberalism and Third Way (1973–2007) ===
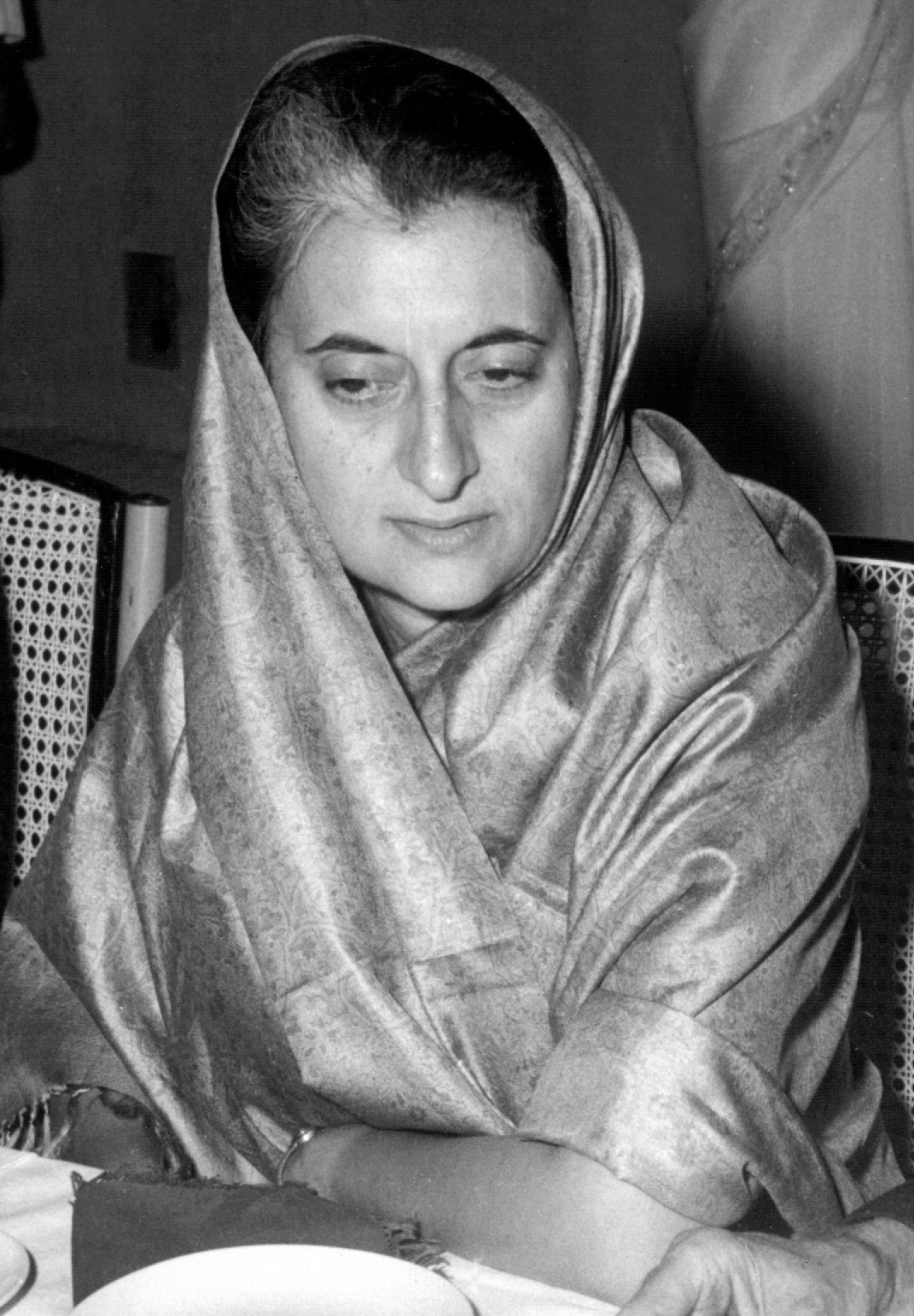
Indira Gandhi, prime minister of India (1966–1977, 1980–1984)

The economic crisis in the Western world in the aftermath of the 1973 oil crisis during the mid- to late 1970s resulted in the rise of neoliberalism and several politicians were elected on neoliberal platforms such as British prime minister Margaret Thatcher and United States president Ronald Reagan. The rise in support for neoliberalism raised questions over the political viability of social democracy, with sociologist Ralf Dahrendorf predicting the "end of the social democratic century". In 1985, an agreement was made between several social democratic parties in the Western Bloc countries of Belgium, Denmark and the Netherlands and with the communist parties of the Eastern Bloc countries of Bulgaria, East Germany and Hungary to have multilateral discussions on trade, nuclear disarmament and other issues.

In 1989, the Socialist International adopted its present Declaration of Principles which addressed issues concerning the internationalization of the economy and defined its interpretation of the nature of socialism. The Declaration of Principles stated that socialist values and vision include "a peaceful and democratic world society combining freedom, justice and solidarity" while arguing that [n]either private nor State ownership by themselves guarantee either economic efficiency or social justice". The Socialist International defined the rights and freedoms it supported as follows: "Socialists protect the inalienable right to life and to physical safety, to freedom of belief and free expression of opinion, to freedom of association and to protection from torture and degradation. Socialists are committed to achieve freedom from hunger and want, genuine social security, and the right to work". It also clarified that it did not promote any fixed and permanent definition for socialism, arguing: "Socialists do not claim to possess the blueprint for some final and fixed society which cannot be changed, reformed or further developed. In a movement committed to democratic self-determination there will always be room for creativity since each people and every generation must set its own goals".

By the 1980s, with the rise of conservative neoliberal politicians such as Ronald Reagan in the United States, Margaret Thatcher in Britain, Brian Mulroney in Canada and Augusto Pinochet in Chile, the Western welfare state was attacked from within, but state support for the corporate sector was maintained. With the fall of Marxism–Leninism in Africa and Eastern Europe, most of those countries adopted liberal democracy and the former ruling parties moved away from Marxism–Leninism and towards social democracy.

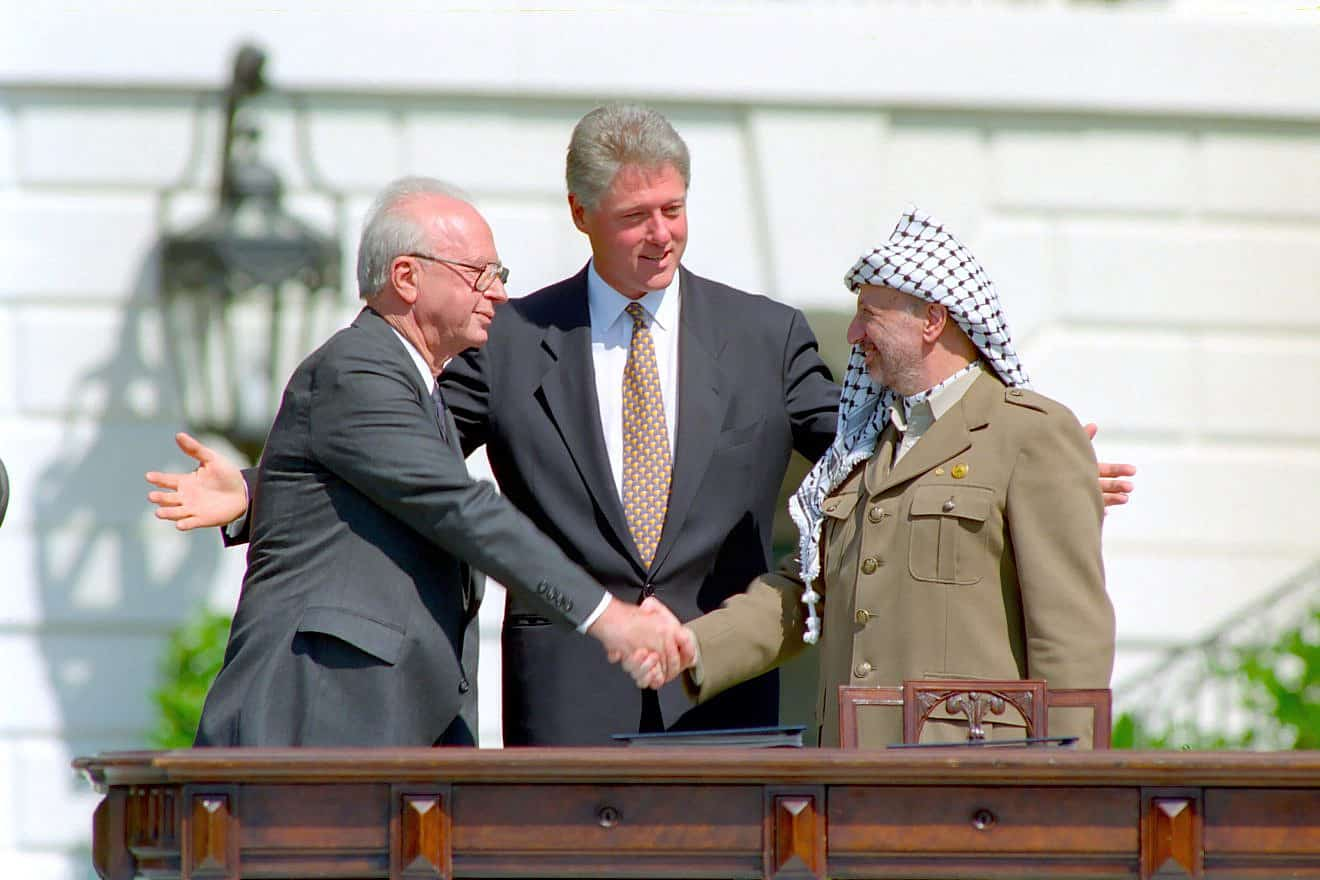
Yitzhak Rabin, the prime minister of Israel and leader of the Israeli Labor Party, shaking hands with Yasser Arafat, the Chairman of the Palestinian Liberation Organization and founder of Fatah, in the presence of United States president Bill Clinton after having signed the Oslo Accords in 1993

The 1989 Socialist International congress was politically significant in that members of the Communist Party of the Soviet Union during the reformist leadership of Mikhail Gorbachev attended the congress. The Socialist International's new Declaration of Principles abandoned previous statements made in the Frankfurt Declaration of 1951 against Soviet-style socialism. After the congress, the Communist Party of the Soviet Union's newspaper Pravda noted that thanks to dialogue between the Soviet Union and the Socialist International since 1979 that the positions of the two organizations on nuclear disarmament issues "today virtually coincide". The Revolutions of 1989 and the resulting collapse of Marxist–Leninist states in Eastern Europe after the end of the Cold War led to the rise of multi-party democracy in many of these countries which resulted in the creation of multiple social democratic parties. Although the majority of these parties initially did not achieve electoral success, they became a significant part of the political landscape of Eastern Europe. In Western Europe, the prominent Italian Communist Party transformed itself into the post-communist Democratic Party of the Left in 1991.

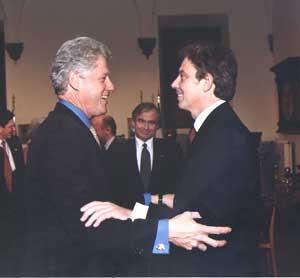
Bill Clinton and Tony Blair, supporters of the Third Way

In the 1990s, the ideology of the Third Way developed and many social democrats became adherents of it. The Third Way has been advocated by its proponents as an alternative to capitalism and what it regards as the traditional forms of socialism (Marxian socialism and state socialism) which Third Way social democrats reject. It officially advocates ethical socialism, reformism and gradualism which includes advocating a humanized version of capitalism, a mixed economy, political pluralism and liberal democracy.

For Giddens and others, there is really no significant difference between revisionism, Lassallian socialism and the Third Way. In each case, they advocated government policies that would immediately help working people rather than revolution and in both cases their critics accused them of having sold out to the establishment and not being real socialists. In particular, the Third Way has been strongly criticized within the social democratic movement for being neoliberal in nature. Left-wing opponents of the Third Way claim that it is not a form of socialism and that it represents social democrats who responded to the New Right by accepting capitalism. Supporters of Third Way ideals argue that they merely represent a necessary or pragmatic adaptation of social democracy to the realities of the modern world, noting that post-war social democracy thrived during the prevailing international climate of the Bretton Woods consensus which collapsed in the 1970s.

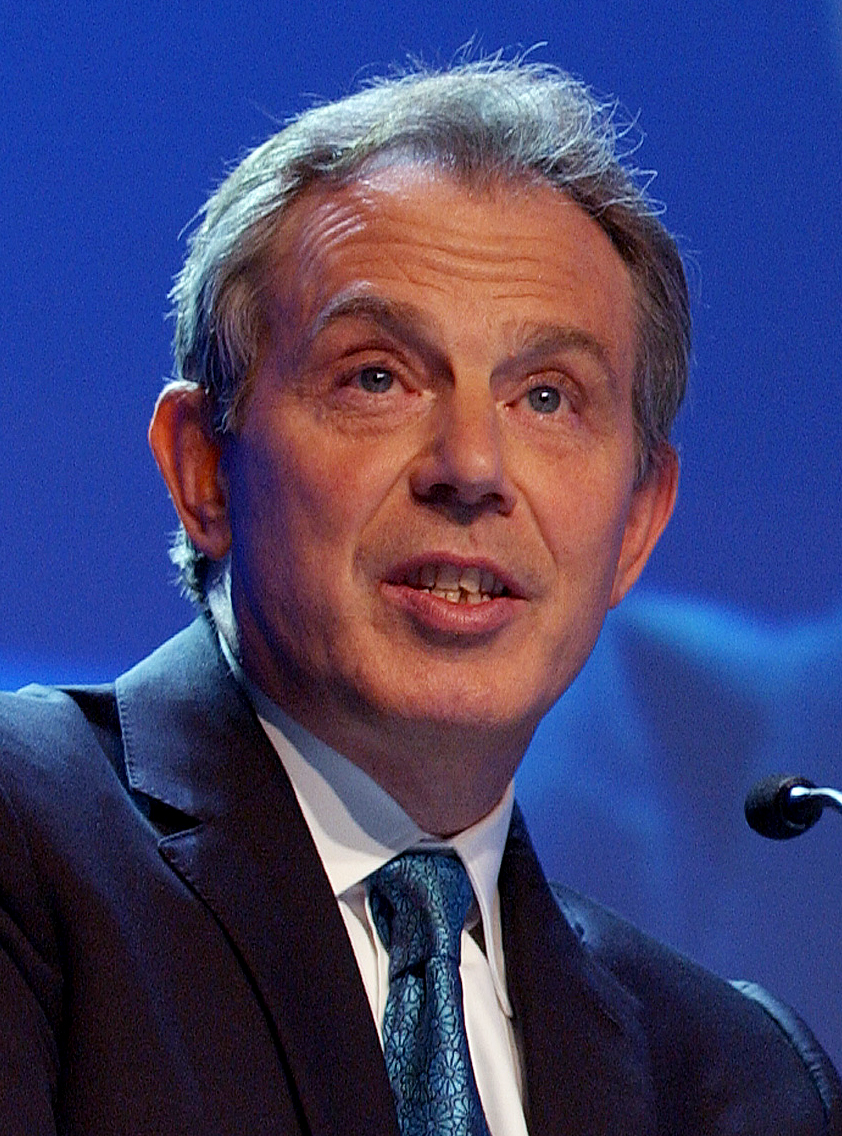
Tony Blair, prime minister of the United Kingdom (1997–2007)

When he was a British Labour Party MP, Third Way supporter and former British prime minister Tony Blair wrote in a Fabian pamphlet in 1994 about the existence of two prominent variants of socialism, with one based on a Marxist–Leninist economic determinist and collectivist tradition that he rejected and the other being an ethical socialism that he supported which was based on values of "social justice, the equal worth of each citizen, equality of opportunity, community". New Labour under Blair sought to distance Labour from the conventional definition of socialism and create a new one representing a modern form of liberal-democratic socialism. However, New Labour sought to avoid regular public use of the word socialism even in this new definition, out of concerns that it would remind the British electorate of the strongly left-wing political strategy of the Labour Party in the early 1980s. Later, One Nation Labour was born as a critique of New Labour. It challenged some of the Third Way policy developments created by New Labour while accepting and modifying others. Like New Labour, One Nation Labour advocated a non-conventional definition of socialism, with Miliband endorsing a form of "capitalism that works for the people" for the time being while declaring support for a "form of socialism, which is a fairer, more just, more equal society". Unlike New Labour, One Nation Labour used the term socialism more publicly.

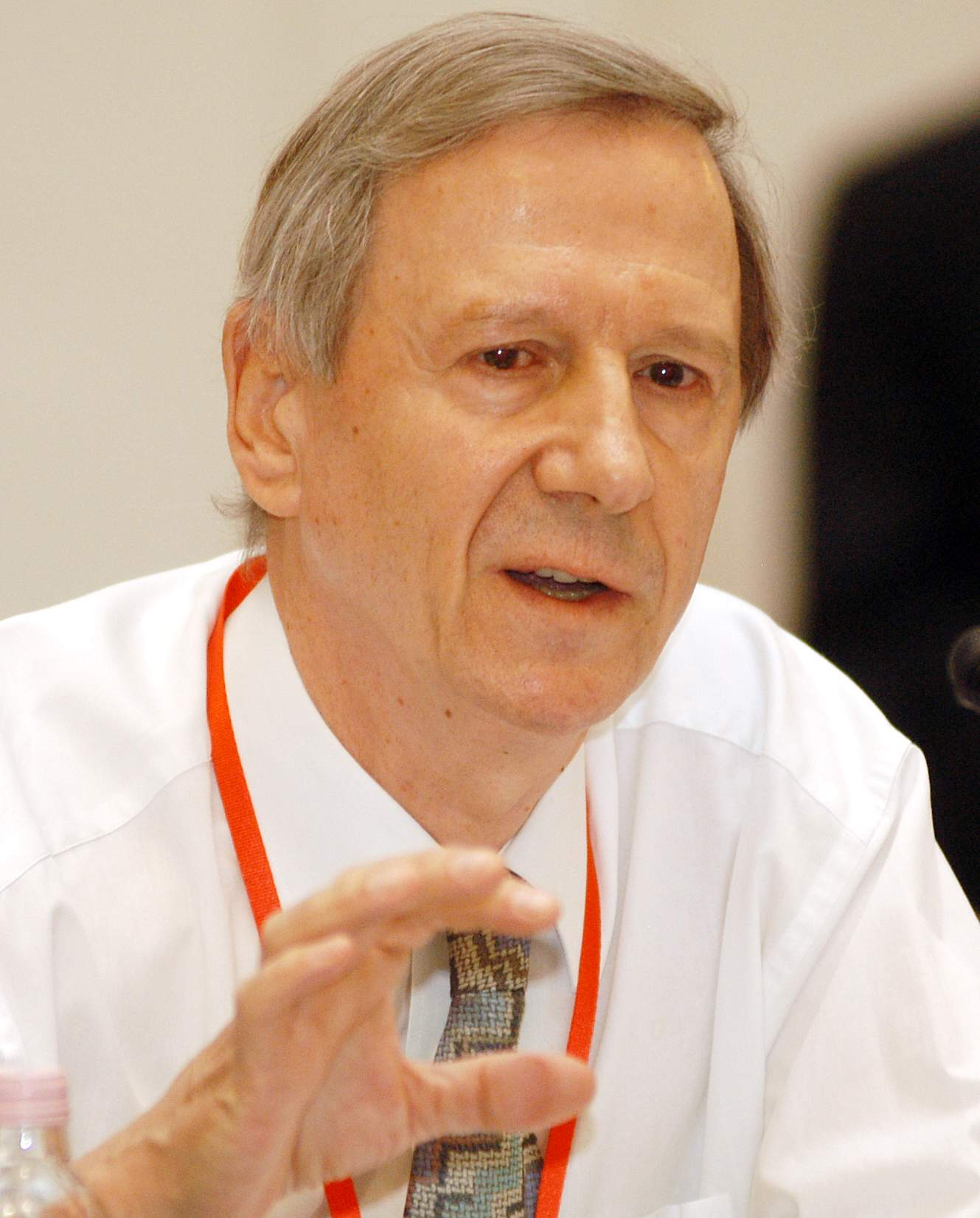
Anthony Giddens, a prominent proponent and ideologue of the Third Way that arose in the 1990s

Prominent Third Way proponent Anthony Giddens views conventional socialism as having become obsolete; however, Giddens says that a viable form of socialism was advocated by Anthony Crosland in his major work The Future of Socialism (1956). He has complimented Crosland as well as Thomas Humphrey Marshall for promoting a viable form of socialism. Giddens views what he considers the conventional form of socialism that defines socialism as a theory of economic management—state socialism—as no longer viable. Giddens rejects what he considers top-down socialism as well as rejecting neoliberalism and criticizes conventional socialism for its common advocacy that socialization of production as achieved by central planning can overcome the irrationalities of capitalism. According to Giddens, this claim "can no longer be defended". He argues that with the collapse of the legitimacy of centrally planned socialization of production, "[w]ith its dissolution, the radical hopes for by socialism are as dead as the Old Conservatism that opposed them". Giddens writes that although there have been proponents of market socialism who have rejected such central planned socialism as well as being resistant to capitalism, "[t]here are good reasons, in my view, to argue that market socialism isn't a realistic possibility". Giddens makes clear that the Third Way as he envisions it is not market socialist, arguing that "[t]here is no Third Way of this sort, and with this realization the history of socialism as the avant-garde of political theory comes to a close".

Giddens contends that Third Way is connected to the legacy of reformist revisionist socialism, writing: "Third way politics stands in the traditions of social democratic revisionism that stretch back to Eduard Bernstein and Karl Kautsky". Giddens commends Crosland's A Future of Socialism for recognizing that socialism cannot be defined merely in terms of a rejection of capitalism because if capitalism did end and was replaced with socialism, then socialism would have no purpose with the absence of capitalism. From Crosland's analysis, Giddens argues that the common characteristic of socialist doctrines is their ethical content, based on the critique of individualism. Giddens defines socialism as "the pursuit of ideas of social cooperation, universal welfare, and equality—ideas brought together by a condemnation of the evils and injustices of capitalism". For Giddens, socialism depends on a belief in "group action and participation" as well as "collective responsibility for social welfare".

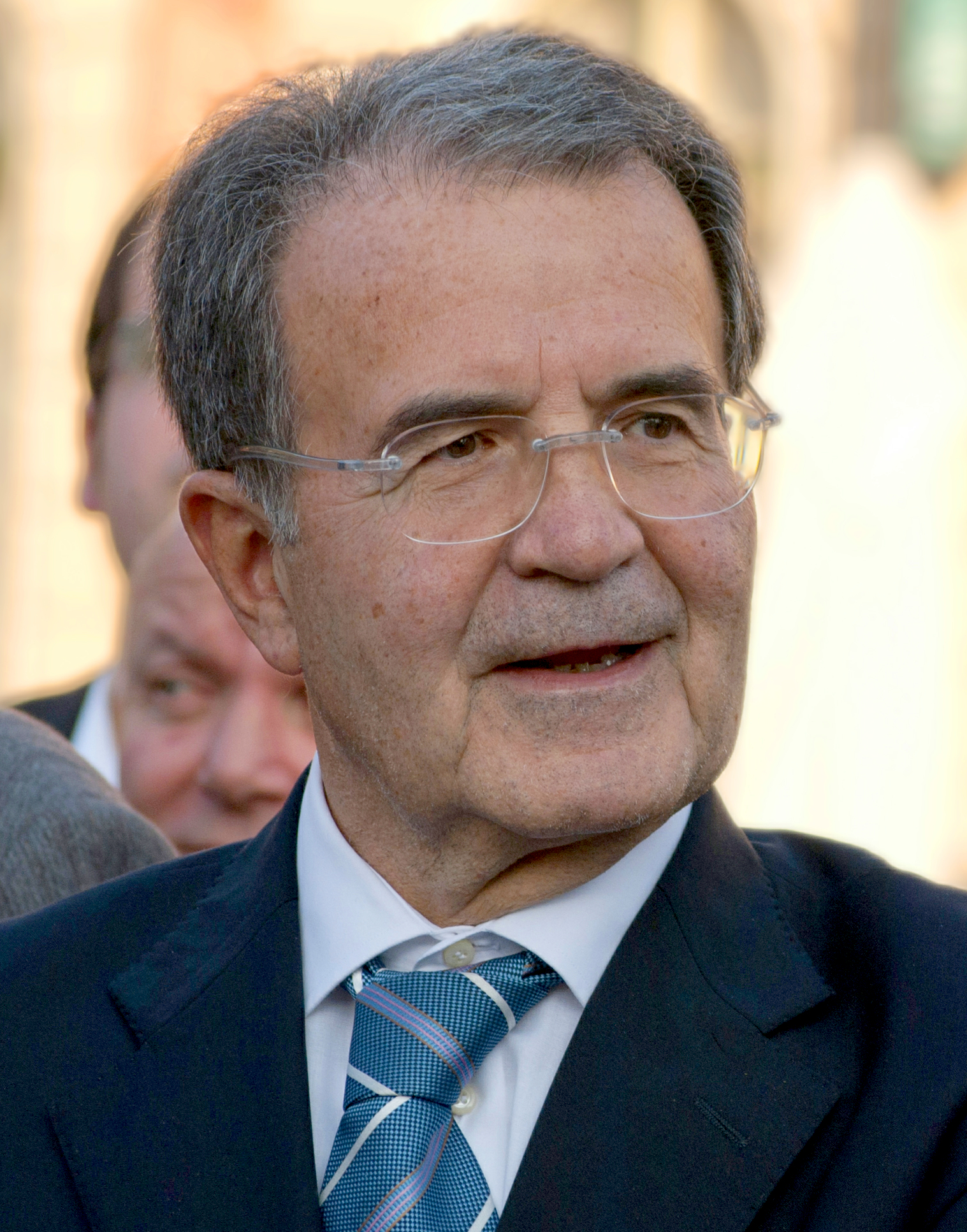
Romano Prodi, the two-time prime minister of Italy, former president of the European Commission and founding father of the Democratic Party

Giddens dissociated himself from many of the interpretations of the Third Way made in the sphere of day-to-day politics—including New Labour—as he reiterated that the point was not a succumbing to neoliberalism or the dominance of capitalist markets, but rather to get beyond both market fundamentalism and top-down socialism to make the values of the centre-left count in a globalizing world. However, Paul Cammack has condemned the Third Way as conceived by Giddens as being a complete attack upon the foundations of social democracy and socialism in which Giddens has sought to replace them with neoliberal capitalism. Cammack claims that Giddens devotes a lot of energy into criticizing conventional social democracy and socialism—such as Giddens' claim that conventional socialism has died because Marx's vision of a new economy with wealth spread in an equitable way is not possible—while at the same time making no criticism of capitalism. Cammack condemns Giddens and his Third Way for being anti-social democratic, anti-socialist and pro-capitalist that he disguises in rhetoric to make it appealing within social democracy.

British political theorist Robert Corfe, a social democratic proponent of a new socialism free of class-based prejudices, criticized both Marxist classists and Third Way proponents within the Labour Party. Corfe has denounced the Third Way as developed by Giddens for "intellectual emptiness and ideological poverty". Corfe has despondently noted and agreed with former long-term British Labour Party MP Alice Mahon's statement in which she said that "Labour is the party of bankers, not workers. The party has lost its soul, and what has replaced it is harsh, American style politics". Corfe claims that the failure to develop a new socialism has resulted in what he considers the "death of socialism" that left social capitalism as only feasible alternative. Some critics and analysts alike have characterized the Third Way as an effectively neoliberal movement.

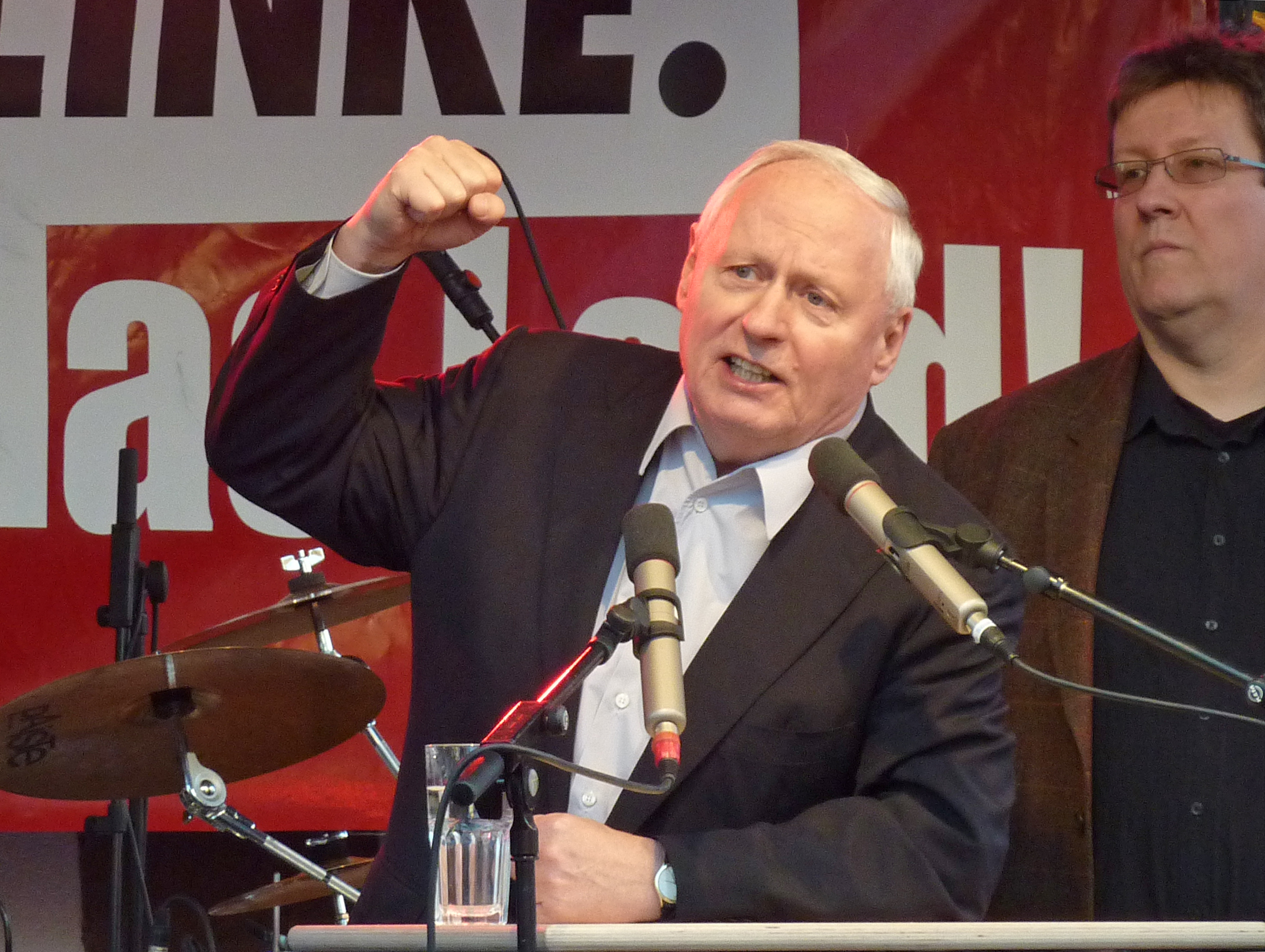
Oskar Lafontaine, co-founder of Germany's political party The Left, had been chairman of the SPD, but he resigned and quit the party due to his opposition to the SPD's turn towards the Third Way under Gerhard Schröder

Former SPD chairman Oskar Lafontaine condemned then-SPD leader and German Chancellor Gerhard Schröder for his Third Way policies, saying that the SPD under Schröder had adopted a "radical change of direction towards a policy of neoliberalism". After resigning from the SPD, Lafontaine co-founded The Left in 2007. The Left was founded out of a merger of the Party of Democratic Socialism (PDS) and the Labour and Social Justice – The Electoral Alternative (WASG), a breakaway faction from the SPD. The Left has been controversial because as a direct successor to the PDS it is also a direct successor of former East Germany's ruling Marxist–Leninist Socialist Unity Party (SED) that transformed into the PDS after the end of the Cold War. However, the PDS did not continue the SED's policies as the PDS adopted policies to appeal to democratic socialists, feminists, greens and pacifists.

Lafontaine said in an interview that he supports the type of social democracy pursued by Willy Brandt, but he claims that the creation of The Left was necessary because "formerly socialist and social democratic parties" had effectively accepted neoliberalism. The Left grew in strength and in the 2009 federal election gained 11 percent of the vote while the SPD gained 23 percent of the vote. Lafontaine has noted that the founding of The Left in Germany has resulted in emulation in other countries, with several Left parties being founded in Greece, Portugal, Netherlands and Syria. Lafontaine claims that a de facto British left movement exists, identifying the Green Party of England and Wales MEP Caroline Lucas as holding similar values.

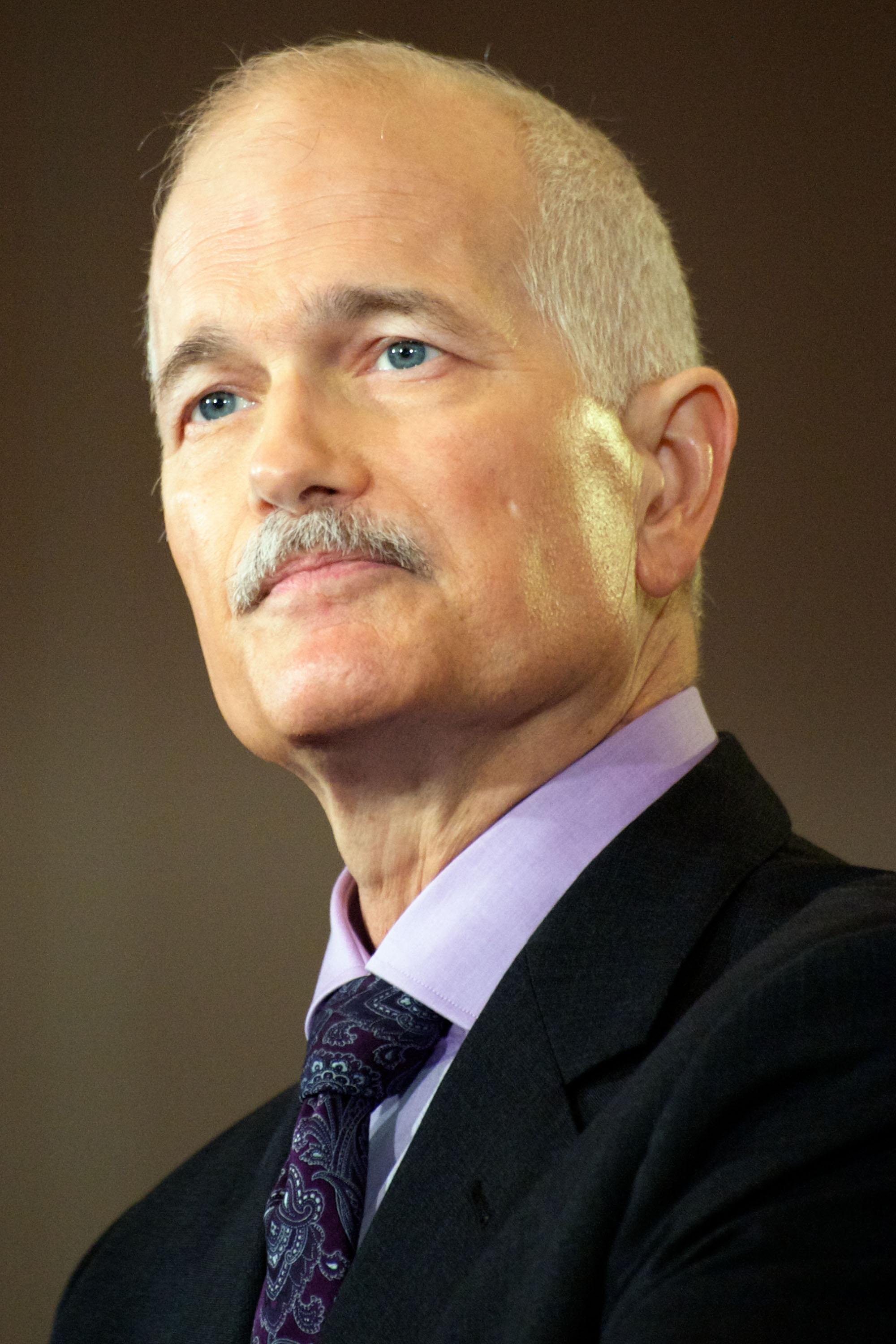
Jack Layton, former leader of the New Democratic Party from 2003 to 2011, led the party to become the second largest Canadian political party for the first time

Others have claimed that social democracy needs to move past the Third Way, including Olaf Cramme and Patrick Diamond in their book After the Third Way: The Future of Social Democracy in Europe (2012). Cramme and Diamond recognize that the Third Way arose as an attempt to break down the traditional dichotomy within social democracy between state intervention and markets in the economy, but they contend that the Great Recession requires that social democracy must rethink its political economy. Cramme and Diamond note that belief in economic planning amongst socialists was strong in the early to mid-20th century, but it declined with the rise of the neoliberal right that attacked economic planning and associated the left with a centralized command economy, conflating it with the administrative-command system and Soviet-type economic planning akin to the Soviet Union and other Marxist–Leninist states. They claim that this formed the foundation of "the Right's moral trap" in which the neoliberal right's attacks on economic-planning policies provokes a defense of such planning by the left as being morally necessary and ends with the right then rebuking such policies as being inherently economically incompetent while presenting itself as the champion of economic competence and responsibility. Cramme and Diamond state that social democracy has five different strategies both to address the economic crisis in global markets at present that it could adopt in response, namely market conforming, market complementing, market resisting, market substituting and market transforming. Cramme and Diamond identify market conforming as being equivalent to British Labour Party politician and former Chancellor of the Exchequer Philip Snowden's desire for a very moderate socialist agenda based above all upon fiscal prudence as Snowden insisted that socialism had to build upon fiscal prudence or else it would not be achieved.

Democratic and market socialists alike have criticized the Third Way for abandoning socialism, arguing that the major reason for the economic shortcomings of Soviet-type economies was their authoritarian nature rather than socialism itself and that it was a failure of a specific model, therefore social democrats should support democratic models of socialism rather than the Third Way. Economists Pranab Bardhan and John Roemer argue that Soviet-type economies failed because they did not create rules and operational criteria for the efficient operation of state enterprises in their administrative, command allocation of resources and commodities and the lack of democracy in the political systems that the Soviet-type economies were combined with. A form of competitive socialism that rejects dictatorship and authoritarian allocation whilst supporting democracy could work and prove superior to free-market capitalism.

Other significant social democratic movements and parties in this period include Turkey's oldest political party, the centre-left secular Republican People's Party (CHP), which was one of the main forces of opposition to military dictatorship and emerged as a major party when democracy was restored in the late 1980s and became the main opposition party after 2002; the Norwegian Labour Party and the New Zealand Labour Party, which have both been in power for a large part of years since 1972, moving from a democratic socialist to pragmatic social democratic ideology; Bangladesh's secular Awami League, one of the country's two main parties after its return to democracy in 1991; and Lebanon's Progressive Socialist Party, which had played a major role in the movement for Arab socialism in the post-war years but became a Third Way party in Lebanon's return to constitutional rule in 1990; Nepali Congress, a democratic socialist party that turned to social democratic/Third Way politics in 1991, when it was re-elected to government;Angola's ruling MPLA, which became a Third Way party from 1992; the Dutch Labour Party, which was in power 1994–2002; Morocco's Socialist Union of Popular Forces, formed in 1975 and leading a centre-left government from 1997 to 2002.

=== Decline and rejection of the Third Way (2007–present) ===
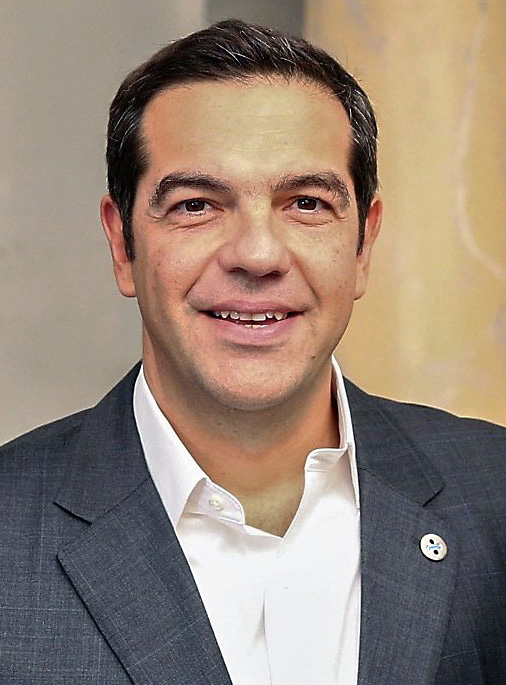
Alexis Tsipras, whose anti-austerity SYRIZA party led as example for like-minded left-wing populist social-democratic parties

In the 2000s, the United Nations World Happiness Report shows that the happiest nations are concentrated in Northern Europe, where the Nordic model (which democratic socialists want to strengthen against austerity and neoliberalism) is employed, with the list being topped by Denmark, where the Social Democrats led their first government in 1924 and governed Denmark for most of the 20th century. The Norwegian Labour Party, the Swedish Social Democratic Party and the Social Democratic Party of Finland also led the majority of governments and were the most popular political parties in their respective countries during the 20th century. While not as popular like its counterparts, the Icelandic Social Democratic Party and the Social Democratic Alliance have also led several governments and have been part of numerous coalitions. This success is at times attributed to the social-democratic Nordic model in the region, where the aforementioned democratic socialist, labourist and social-democratic political parties have dominated the political scene and laid the ground to universalistic welfare states in the 20th century, fitting the social-democratic type of "high socialism" which is described as favouring "a high level of decommodification and a low degree of stratification." The Nordic countries, including Denmark, Finland, Iceland, Norway and Sweden as well as Greenland and the Faroe Islands, also ranked highest on the metrics of real GDP per capita, economic equality, healthy life expectancy, public health, having someone to count on, education, perceived freedom to make life choices, generosity and human development. The Nordic countries have ranked high on indicators such as civil liberties, democracy, press, labour and economic freedoms, peace and freedom from corruption. Numerous studies and surveys have indicated that people tend to live happier lives in social democracies and welfare states as opposed to neoliberal and free-market economies. Social democratic parties saw electoral success in countries such as Argentina (where Cristina Fernández de Kirchner won the presidency in 2007), Australia (where Kevin Rudd's Australian Labor Party won the 2007 election), Bangladesh (where the Awami League has governed since 2009), France (where the PS won the 2012 election), Jamaica (where the People's National Party won the 2012 election), Belgium (where the Socialist Party governed 2011-2014), and Chile (where Michelle Bachelet was elected president in 2013.

Nevertheless, with the Great Recession, the social democratic parties that had dominated some of the post-World War II political landscape in Western Europe were under pressure in some countries to the extent that a commentator in Foreign Affairs called it an "implosion of the centre-left". The Israeli Labor Party went into gradual decline in the early 2000s following the October 2000 riots and the violence of the al-Aqsa Intifada. The first European country that saw a similar development was Greece in the aftermath of the Great Recession and the Greek government-debt crisis. Support for the Greek social democratic party PASOK declined from 43.9% in the 2009 Greek legislative election to 4.68% in the January 2015 Greek legislative election. The decline subsequently proved to not be isolated to Greece as it spread to a number of countries in Europe, a phenomenon many observers described as Pasokification.

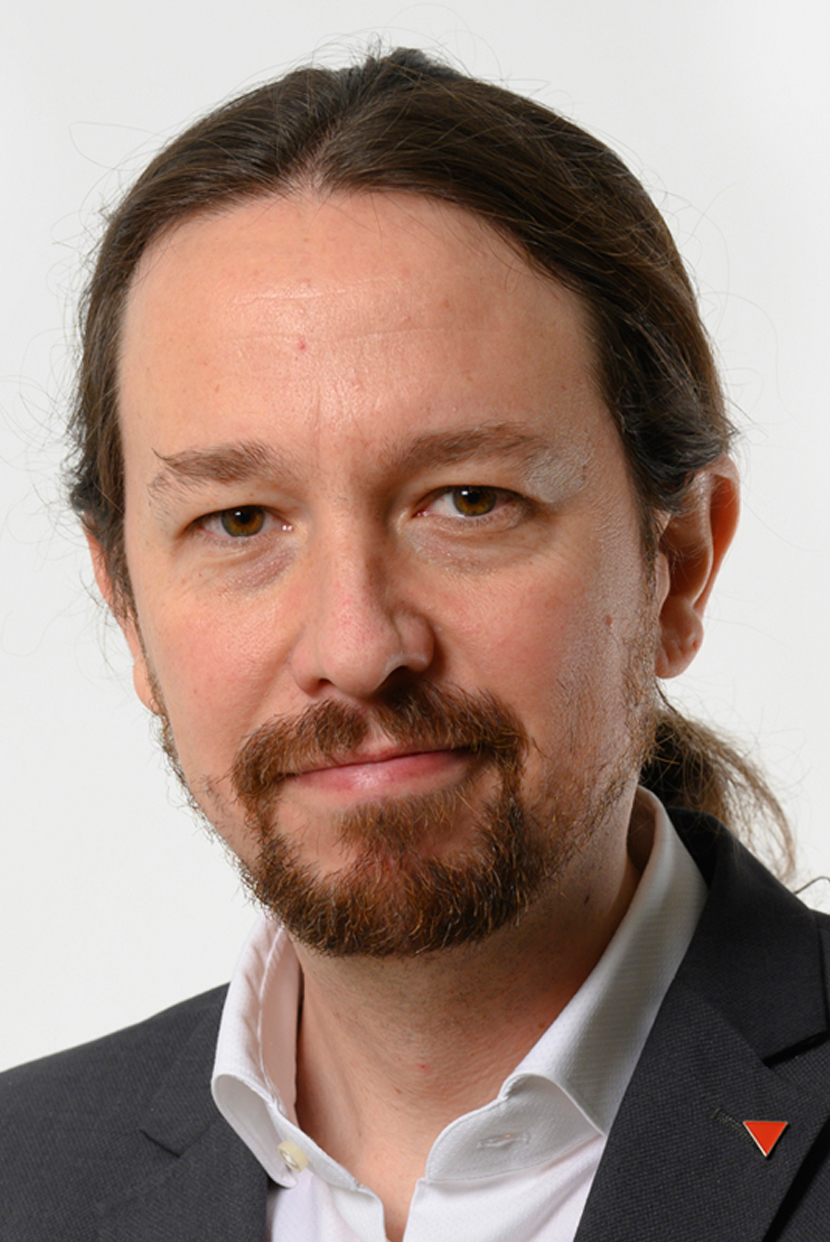
Pablo Iglesias Turrión, former General Secretary of Podemos, a left-wing populist social-democratic party

In 2017, support for social democratic parties in other countries such as Denmark and Portugal was relatively strong in polls. Moreover, the decline of the social democratic parties in some countries was accompanied by a surge in the support for other centre-left or left-wing parties such as Syriza in Greece, the Left-Green Movement in Iceland and Podemos in Spain. Several explanations for the European decline have been proposed. Some commentators highlight that the social democratic support of national fragmentation and labour market deregulation had become less popular among potential voters. Others such as the French political scientist Pierre Manent emphasize the need for social democrats to rehabilitate and reinvigorate the idea of nationhood.

In a 2017 article in The Political Quarterly, Jörg Michael Dostal argues that the decline of the center-left in Germany is the consequence of electoral disillusionment with Third Way and neoliberal policies, or more specifically Gerhard Schröder's embrace of the Hartz reforms which recommended the privatization and reduction of the welfare state as well as the deregulation of the labour market and reduction of workers' rights. According to Dostal, the SPD subsequently lost half of its former electoral coalition (i.e. blue-collar voters and socially disadvantaged groups) while efforts to attract centrist and middle-class voters failed to produce any compensating gains. Furthermore, the article concludes that the only possible remedy is for the SPD to make efforts to regain former voters by abandoning neoliberalism and offering credible social-welfare and redistributive policies. Earlier in 2016, a research article in Socio-Economic Review found that the longer-term electoral effects of the Hartz plan and Agenda 2010 on relevant voter groups were limited, but that it had helped to entrench The Left as a permanent political force to its left.

After the Labour Party's surprising loss in the 2017 Norwegian parliamentary election, commentators such as the editor of Avisenes Nyhetsbyrå highlight that the party had ignored a strong surge in discontent with mass immigration among potential voters. Hanne Skartveit of Verdens Gang claimed that social democrats have been struggling because the sustainability of the welfare state is challenged by mass immigration. Skarstein emphasize the contrast between social democrats' strong commitment for helping people on the international scene on one side and their strong commitment in favour of welfare policies for the nation's own population on the other.

Spain is one of the countries in which the PSOE, the main social democratic party, has been governing for a longer period of time than any other party since the transition to democracy in 1977. However, it has also declined like the European social democratic parties, losing half of its electorate between 2010 and 2015 to Podemos and gaining its worst ever result in the 2015 Spanish general election since the restoration of democracy in Spain. Despite this loss, the PSOE returned to power in June 2018 after the government of Mariano Rajoy was ousted in a vote of no confidence in the aftermath of a corruption scandal, with Pedro Sánchez leading the party. Some authors consider his government the last hope for Europe to retain its social democratic heritage and believe they would act as an example to like-minded politicians in other countries. By 2019 and 2020, Denmark, Finland and Italy saw a return of their main social democratic party back in power while Portugal, Spain and Sweden confirmed their social democratic governments. In the case of Italy and Spain, the centre-left parties allied with anti-establishment, populist and other left-leaning parties in coalition governments.

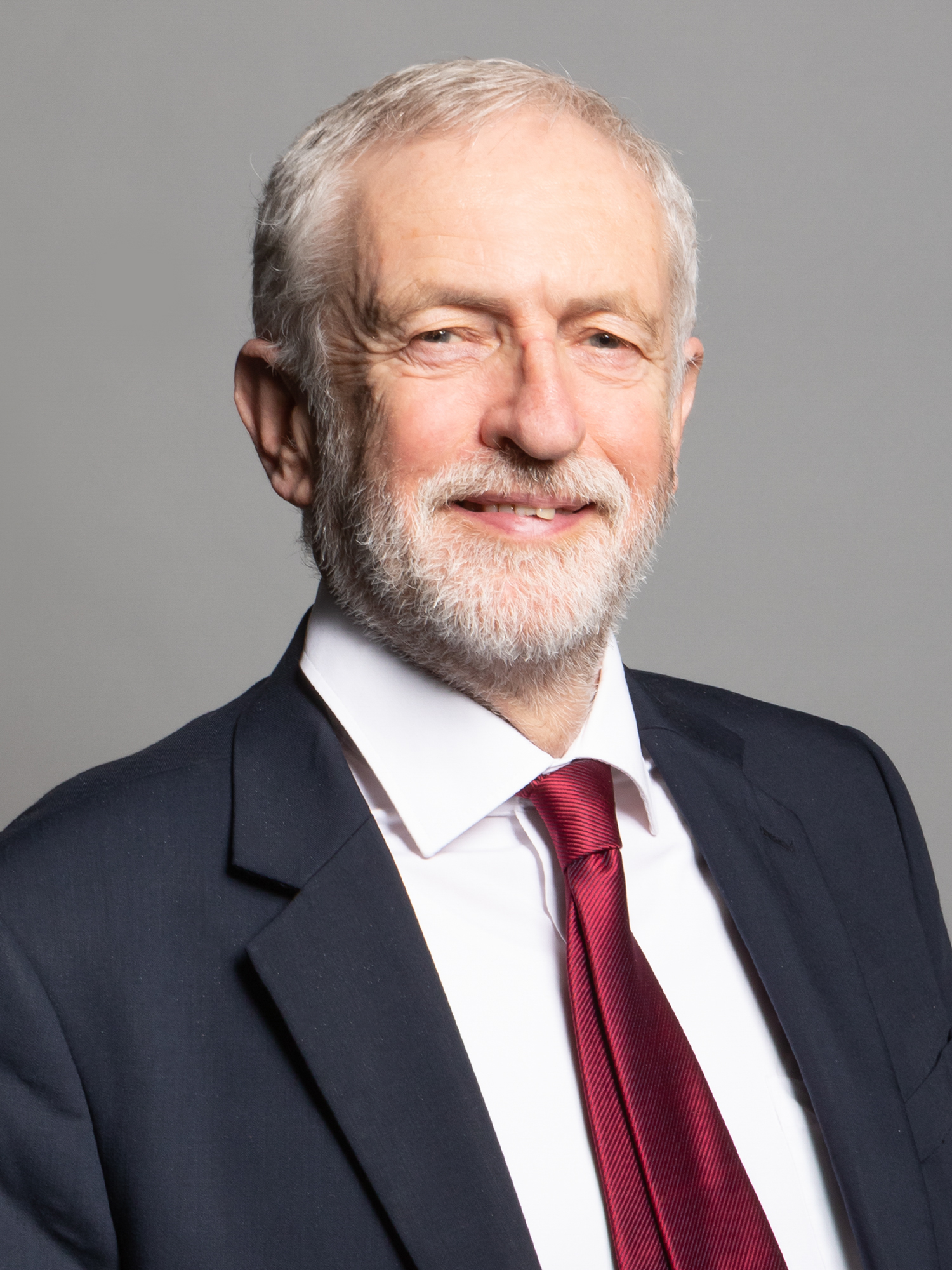
Jeremy Corbyn, who won the 2015 Labour Party leadership election on a campaign based on the rejection of austerity and Blairite policies within the Labour Party itself

Several social democratic parties such as the British Labour Party under Jeremy Corbyn have outright rejected the Third Way strategy and moved back to the left on economics and class issues. After running in the 2014 PSOE primary election as a centrist profile, Pedro Sánchez later switched to the left in his successful 2017 bid to return to the PSOE leadership in which he stood for a refoundation of social democracy in order to transition to a post-capitalist society, putting an end to neoliberal capitalism. A key personal idea posed in Sánchez's 2019 Manual de Resistencia book is the indissoluble link between social democracy and Europe.

Other parties such as the Danish Social Democrats shifted hard to the right on the issue of mass immigration. The party believes it has had negative impacts for much of the population and it has been seen as a more pressing issue since at least 2001 after the 11 September attacks that has intensified during the 2015 European migrant crisis. The perception of the party being soft on immigration is asserted to have contributed to its poor electoral performance in the early 21st century. In a recent biography, the Danish Social Democrats' party leader and prime minister Mette Frederiksen argued: "For me, it is becoming increasingly clear that the price of unregulated globalisation, mass immigration and the free movement of labour is paid for by the lower classes". Frederiksen later shifted her stance on immigration by allowing more foreign labour and reversing plans to hold foreign criminals offshore after winning government. A 2020 study disputed the notion that anti-immigration positions would help social democratic parties. The study found that "more authoritarian/nationalist and more anti-EU positions are if anything associated with lower rather than greater electoral support for social democratic parties".

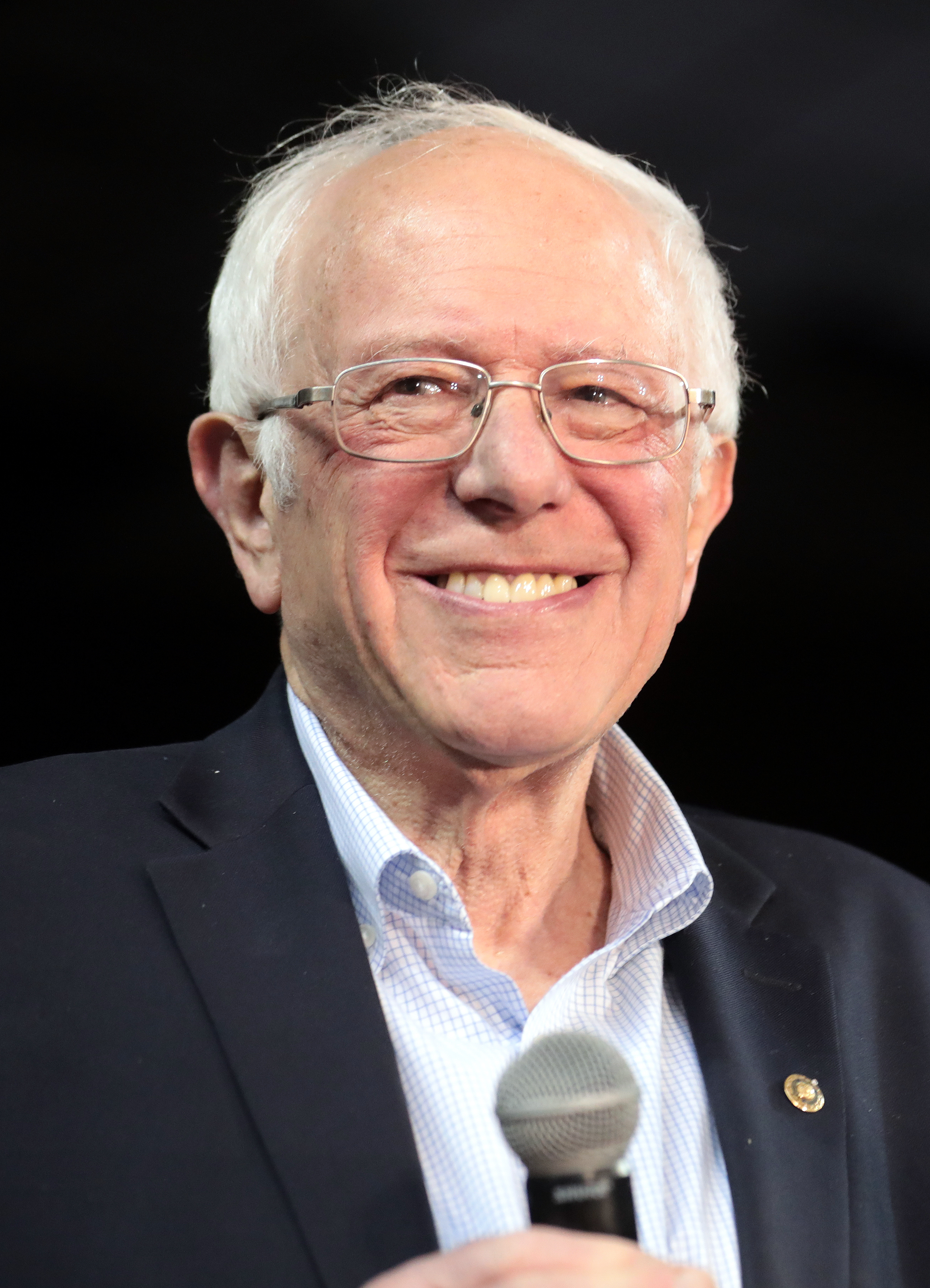
Bernie Sanders, a democratic socialist, whose beliefs are inspired by the Nordic model.

In 2016, Senator from Vermont Bernie Sanders, who describes himself as a "democratic socialist" rather than a social democrat, made a bid for the Democratic Party presidential nomination, gaining considerable popular support, particularly among the younger generation, working-class Americans, and rural voters, but ultimately the presidential nomination was won by liberal candidate Hillary Clinton, who later accommodated a number of the policies he promoted into her campaign. Sanders ran again in the 2020 Democratic Party presidential primaries, briefly becoming the front-runner.

Since his praise of the Nordic model indicated focus on social democracy as opposed to views involving social ownership of the means of production, some political commentators have argued that "democratic socialism" has become a misnomer for social democracy in American politics, Sanders historically advocated for the nationalization of energy, oil, manufacturing and banking, as well as public ownership and worker self-management of most major industries, during his time in the anti-capitalist Liberty Union Party in the 1970s, and more recently, supported the creation of federally-owned electrical utility companies to carry out the decarbonization of the energy sector and directly operate energy generation, while supporting the near-complete nationalization of services traditionally carried out by private health insurance through Medicare for All, which would eliminate out-of-pocket costs and cost sharing for most healthcare services, which is virtually unprecedented as of 2019.

He supports workplace democracy, an expansion of worker cooperatives and the democratisation of the economy. Sanders' proposed legislation include worker-owned businesses, the Workplace Democracy Act, employee ownership as alternative to corporations and a package to encourage employee-owned companies. While seen as part of the modern liberal or social democratic tradition, Sanders asserts that the New Deal as part of the socialist tradition and claimed the New Deal's legacy to "take up the unfinished business of the New Deal and carry it to completion;" despite this claim, Franklin D. Roosevelt's desired path to recovery from the Great Depression involved the reform and preservation of capitalism and the system of private enterprise.

The Progressive Alliance is a political international organisation founded on 22 May 2013 by left-wing political parties, the majority of which are current or former members of the Socialist International. The organisation states that its aim is becoming the global network of "the progressive, democratic, social-democratic, socialist and labour movement."
