= Klindworth =

Klindworth or Klintworth may refer to the following people:

Klindworth:

- Johann Andreas Klindworth (1742–1813), German watchmaker and court mechanic
  - Carl August Klindworth, 19th century German mechanic and entrepreneur, son of Johann Klindworth
    - Karl Klindworth (1830–1917), German composer, pianist, conductor, violinist and music publisher, son of Carl Klindworth
  - Georg Klindworth (1798–1882), German diplomat and intelligence agent, son of Johann Klindworth and brother of Carl Klindworth
    - Agnes Street-Klindworth (1825–1906), illegitimate daughter of Georg Klindworth and lover of the composer Franz Liszt
- Johann Klindworth (1900–1976), German politician, Christian Democratic Union member of the Landtag of Lower Saxony
- Steve Klindworth, founder of SuperCircuits, an audio and video surveillance company in Texas, U.S.

Klintworth:

- Gordon K. Klintworth (1932–2014), American professor of ophthalmology and pathology
- Kimberly Perkins Klintworth, American journalist and main host of the television program Profiles in Caring

== See also ==
- Klindworth-Scharwenka Conservatory
