= Karl Klindworth =

German composer and pianist (1830–1916)

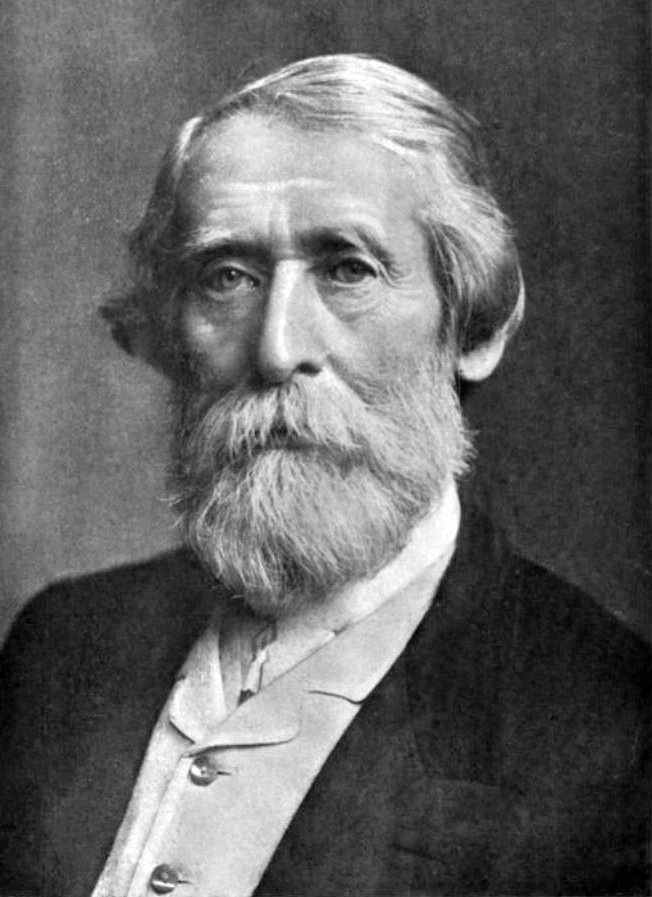
- Klindworth, c. 1898

Background information
- Born: 25 September 1830; Hanover, Kingdom of Hanover
- Died: 27 July 1916 (aged 85) Stolpe an der Peene, German Empire

Karl Klindworth (25 September 1830 – 27 July 1916) was a German composer, virtuoso pianist, conductor, violinist and music publisher. He was one of Franz Liszt's pupils and later one of his closest disciples and friends. He was also on friendly terms with composer Richard Wagner, of whose music he made numerous piano transcriptions.

He was highly praised by fellow musicians, including Wagner himself and Edward Dannreuther. Among his pupils were Hans von Bülow, Georgy Catoire, and Ethelbert Nevin.

== Biography ==
=== Family ===
Klindworth was born in Hanover in 1830 as the son of Carl August Klindworth and Dorothea Wilhelmine (1800–1853), née Lamminger, daughter of court printer Johann Thomas Lamminger (1757–1805). He was the paternal nephew of diplomat and intelligence agent Georg Klindworth and clockmaker Karl Friedrich Felix Klindworth (1788–1851).

As a child, the young Klindworth received violin lessons and taught himself to play the piano. As he was not accepted as violin pupil of Louis Spohr, he then joined a traveling theater company as a successful violinist and conductor when he was only 17. In 1850, he took over the leadership of the Neue Liedertafel in Hanover. In the summer of 1852, Klindworth went to Weimar where he took piano lessons with Franz Liszt and was soon one of his closest disciples and friends. He also became on friendly terms with Richard Wagner.

=== Career ===
In 1854, Klindworth went to London, where he remained for fourteen years, studying, teaching and occasionally appearing in public. From London Klindworth went to Moscow in 1868, following Nikolai Rubinstein's invitation to take up the position of professor of pianoforte at the Moscow Conservatory, where he first met Pyotr Ilyich Tchaikovsky as professor of harmony. While in Russia, he completed his pianoforte arrangements for Wagner's Der Ring des Nibelungen, which he had commenced during Wagner's visit to England in 1855, Beethoven's sonatas and also his critical edition of Frédéric Chopin's works. He then became conductor of the Berlin Philharmonic in 1882, in association with Joseph Joachim and Franz Wüllner, being also the conductor of the Berlin Wagner Society. At this time, he established the Klindworths Musikschule, which later became the Klindworth-Scharwenka Conservatory.

Klindworth remained in Berlin until 1893, when he retired to Potsdam, practicing as a teacher. He earned his great reputation as an editor of musical works, having re-orchestrated Chopin's second piano concerto, adopted and raised Winifred Williams to be a perfect "Wagnerite" and made the orchestration of the first movement of Alkan's solo piano concerto, the eighth of the composer's etudes in all the minor keys, though others have since orchestrated all three movements. He died in 1916 in Stolpe, near Oranienburg, aged 85.

== Works ==
=== Piano works ===
- Concert-Polonaise
- Polonaise-Fantaisie, dedicated to "mes amis de Londres"

=== Arrangements ===
- Hector Berlioz: Ballet of the Sylphs and Hungarian March from The Damnation of Faust
- Pyotr Ilyich Tchaikovsky: Roméo et Juliette for two pianos, Francesca da Rimini, for piano for 4 hands and Andante cantabile from String Quartet No. 1, Op. 11
- Wolfgang Amadeus Mozart: Requiem, K626 for solo piano.
- Franz Schubert's Great C major Symphony for two pianos
- Richard Wagner: Rienzi, The Flying Dutchman, Tannhauser, Prelude to act 3 of Lohengrin, Tristan and Isolde, The Mastersingers of Nuremberg, Ring of the Nibelungen, Prelude of Parsifal
- Charles-Valentin Alkan: Concerto for Piano and Orchestra, Op.39 originally from Douze Études dans Tous les Tons Mineurs, Op.39 no.8 1st movement from : Concerto for Solo Piano (Allegro Assai)

=== Editions ===
- Frédéric Chopin: Oeuvres completes, 6 volumes. Moscow (1873–1876)
- Ludwig van Beethoven: Sonatas for piano, 3 vols. Berlin (1884)
- Johann Sebastian Bach: The Well-Tempered Clavier, Mainz (1894)
- Felix Mendelssohn: Songs Without Words, London (1898)

=== Piano schools ===
- The skill in playing the piano, 24 pieces of exercise in all major and minor keys. Mainz (1897)
- Novello's School of Pianoforte. London (1902)
- Elementary Piano School'. London, Mainz (1903)
- 24 pieces of exercise in all major and minor keys for the training of skill in playing the piano, latest magazine for Bertini's piano school.

=== Letters and writings ===
- Then and now in England. Bayreuth (1898)
- Memory and thoughts of Karl Klindworth, letters to Wahnfried. Bayreuth (1916)
- Unpublished Karl Klindworth's letters to Tchaikovsky. Berlin (1965)

== See also ==
- Klindworth
- Agnes Street-Klindworth
