= Lassallean General German Workers' Association =

Historical political party in Germany

Lassallean General German Workers' Association Lassallescher Allgemeiner Deutscher Arbeiterverein
- President: Friedrich Wilhelm Emil Försterling (1867-1868); Fritz Mende (1868-1873)
- Founder: Sophie von Hatzfeldt
- Founded: 16 June 1867; 159 years ago
- Newspaper: Freie Zeitung
- Ideology: Social democracy Lassallism
- Political position: Left-wing
- Colors: Red

The Lassallean General German Workers' Association (German: Lassallescher Allgemeiner Deutscher Arbeiterverein, LADAV) was a German Lassallean political party founded by Sophie von Hatzfeldt and Emil Försterling in June 1867 as a result of a split from the General German Workers' Association (ADAV). Having seen limited electoral success, the party effectively disbanded in 1872.

== Organizational history ==
=== Split from ADAV ===
The death of Ferdinand Lassalle in 1864 led to internal conflict within ADAV. Sophie von Hatzfeldt, Lassalle's partner and an important financial supporter of the party, thought herself responsible for ensuring the continuation of the work of the now-deceased party founder. Her intent on preventing any changes to Lassalle's program or organizational structure led to conflit over resolutions passed at the ADAV May 1867 general assembly in Braunschweig. Its overall stance was that, since the North German Constitution of 1867 introduced universal male suffrage, Lassalle's central demand had been met, at least in the northern parts of Germany, and should not be focused on anymore. On top of that, Jean Baptista von Schweitzer, one of Hatzfeldt's fiercest internal rivals, became the party president. He immediately began expulsions of those he perceived as involved in the "women's intrigues" of Hatzfeld. These measures were perceived by Hatzfeld as straying too far from Lasalle's intentions.

Sophie von Hatzfeldt, with her supporters, including Emil Försterling and Fritz Mende, called upon those among the ADAV membership who wanted to keep the adherence to the old statutes to elect a president and representatives for a constitutive assembly that would take place on 16 June 1867. Försterling was elected president, but it was Mende who ultimately assumed the de facto control over the party. Approximately one-fifth of ADAV members joined the newly constituted party, making up around 34 groups with an estimated membership of 3000. The organization soon proved fragile, losing more than half of its members in Northern Germany. The party congregations were conentrated mainly in Chemnitz in Saxony, Bremen, Altona, and parts of Schleswig-Holstein.

=== Participation in national politics ===
First electoral success came in the August 1867 North German federal election, when Emil Försterling, LADAV's president, was elected as the representative of Chemnitz to the Reichstag, with Hatzfeldt funding his campaign. He would be joined by Fritz Mende in 1869, resulting from a victory in a by-election in Freiberg following the resignation of Friedrich Raimund Sachße.

Mende, although already the de facto leader, became the president of LADAV in 1868. His extensive agitation, which also led to his conviction and incarceration for an incident in Düsseldorf, managed to temporarily halt the decline in membership, with new congregations established in the Rhineland.

However, further expansion suffered from the party's high centralization. The rigid adherence to Lassalle's principles led to the fight against agitators and subversive elements playing an important role in the general assemblies. The party had barely any membership fees, relying on the funding from the personal fortune of Countess Hatzfeldt, who herself could not become a party member for the law at the time prohibited women from participating in party politics, continued to play an important role within the party, even replacing Mende during his frequent periods of illness.

Although LADAV and ADAV did not directly compete in elections, due to divergent regional focus, the relationship between the two parties was not peaceful, with frequent mutual attacks and polemics in the respective party press. Both organizations shared a critical stance towards labor unions and strikes, instead emphasizing party organization as a vessel for worker interests.

=== Reunification and dissolution ===
On 11 October 1868, during Mende's incarceration, Jean Baptista von Schweitzer, the president of ADAV, managed to push for a vote to release Mende from jail, even despite Bismarck speaking out against it. The two presidents announced the reunification of their two Lassallean parties on 18 June 1869. The announcement came as a complete surprise to the members of both parties, given their previous mutual hostility. This led to the secession of the LADAV members from Chemnitz, the party's most important stronghold. The reasoning for the decision to reunite on LADAV's part was based on their failure to establish themselves as an alternative to ADAV, and on financial problems, especially since Hatzfeldt's withdrawal of funding.

While Mende and Hatzfeld had hoped the reunification would lead to ADAV returning to an orthodox Lassallean course, this would not come to be. A renewing split was becoming apparent as early as October 1869, and LADAV was reconstituted in January 1870. Its importance however continued to decline. Emil Försterling resigned from his seat in the Reichstag and became the head treasurer of the party, owing to the financial support of Hatzfeld. In the first election to the Reichstag of the German Empire, Mende failed to get a seat, and Försterling did not run for the election. Försterling returned to the party leadership as vice-president in 1871, but, after his death on 10 March 1872, the party gradually faded away, with Freie Zeitung (the party newspaper) ceasing publication in June 1872, and Mende giving up his presidency of the effectively defunct LADAV in 1873.
