= Friedrich Wilhelm Emil Försterling =

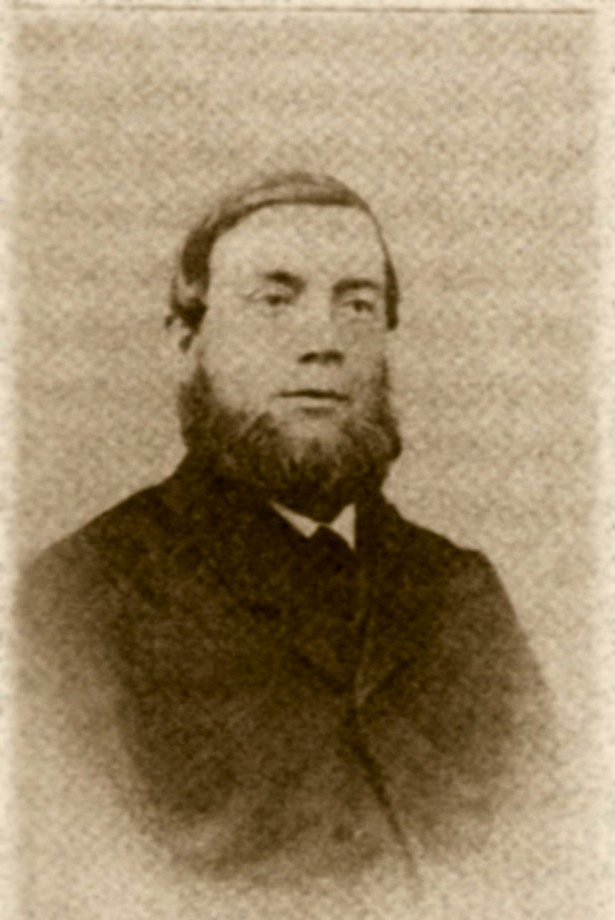
Friedrich Wilhelm Portrait

Friedrich Wilhelm Emil Försterling (3 September 1827, Dresden – 10 March 1872, Dresden) was a German Social Democratic politician. He was President of the General German Workers' Association (ADAV) and a member of the Reichstag of the North German Confederation.

Försterling was a coppersmith by trade. By 1849, he was chairman of a workers' association in Clausthal-Zellerfeld, Lower Saxony. He moved to Dresden and by 1861 he was chairman of the Dresden Educational Association for Tradespeople. He joined the ADAV in 1863, joining the leadership in 1863 and acting as the chief cashier in 1865. He became a City Councillor for Dresden in 1865 and led the ADAV in that city.

In June 1867, he founded the Lasallean General German Workers' Association (LADAV) with Sophie von Hatzfeldt, a splinter group from the ADAV. Although acting as President for this party and standing successfully for them in the Chemnitz Reichstag constituency during the August 1867 election for the Reichstag of the North German Confederation, he started to step back from active politics, resigning from the Reichstag in April 1870.
