= Becky Douglas =

American philanthropist (born 1952)

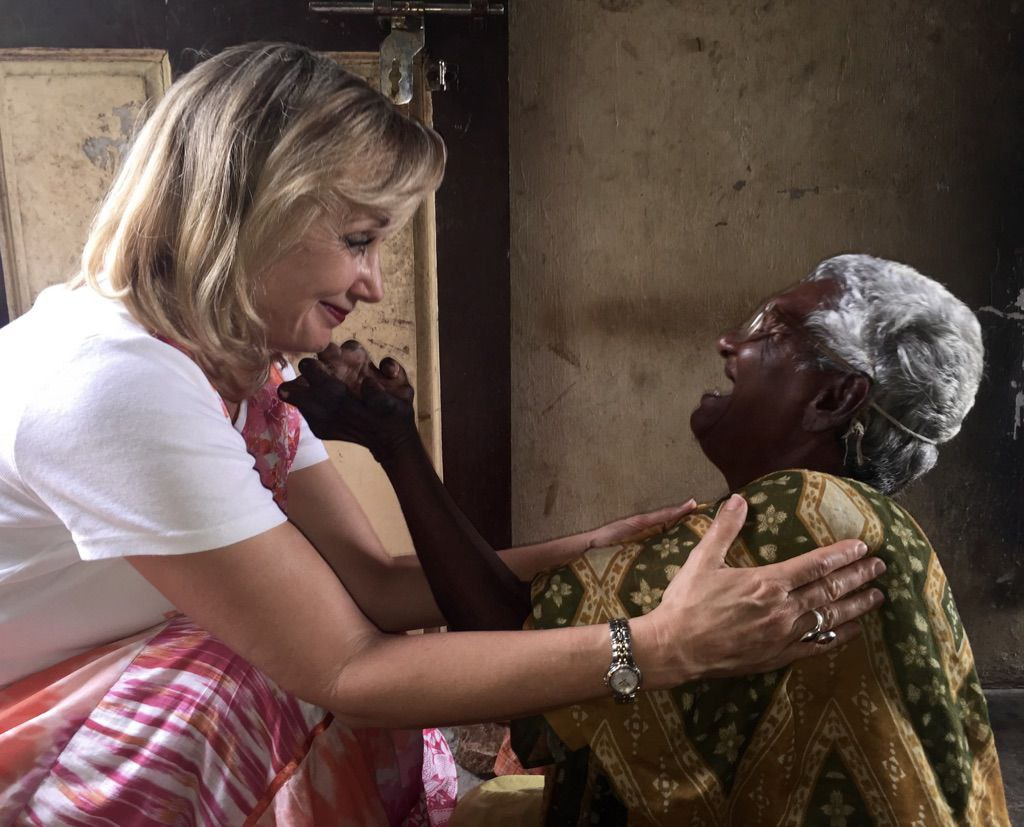
- Born: Rebecca Ann Peterson; Salt Lake City, Utah
- Citizenship: American
- Education: Queens University of Charlotte
- Organization: Rising Star Outreach
- Spouse: John Douglas
- Website: https://risingstaroutreach.org/

Rebecca Ann Peterson Douglas, known as Becky Douglas, is an American housewife who founded Rising Star Outreach, a nonprofit organization that supports individuals and communities in India affected by leprosy.

== Early life and education ==
Douglas was born and raised in Salt Lake City, Utah. She graduated from Skyline High School in 1970 and attended Queens College on a full scholarship for violin performance.

== Rising Star Outreach ==
Following the death of her daughter, Amber, Douglas founded Rising Star Outreach in 2001. She was featured in two PBS documentaries: Breaking the Curse, which won a Gracie Award, and LIFT - Connecting Humanity. She was also featured in Profiles in Caring, which was aired across the US and in over 40 countries.

In 2008 she received a Classic Woman Award from Traditional Home magazine.

== Personal life ==
Douglas is married to John L. Douglas. They have 10 children, including 3 adopted, and live in Peachtree Corners, Georgia.

Douglas is a member of the Church of Jesus Christ of Latter-day Saints. in 2012 she and her husband, John served as mission leaders for their church in the Dominican Republic Santiago Mission.
