= Chemnitz Reichstag constituency =

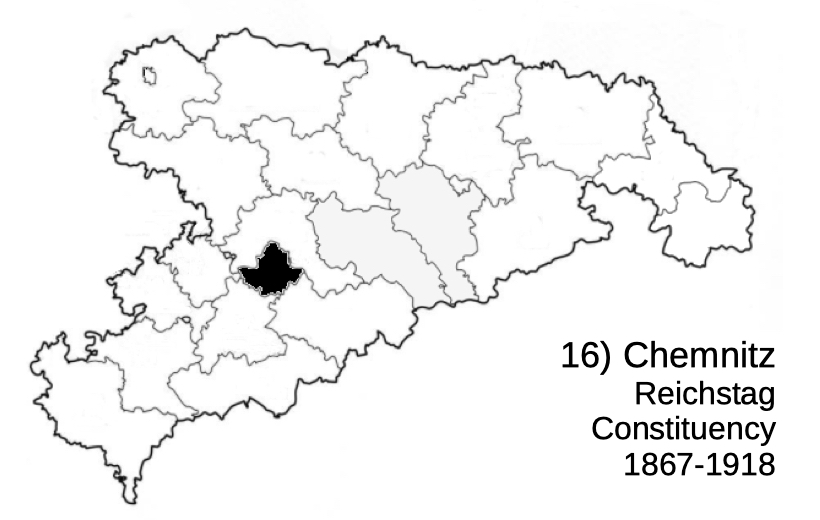

The Chemnitz Reichstag constituency was constituency No. 16 in the Kingdom of Saxony which returned a deputy to the German Reichstag. It was based upon what was the town of Chemnitz.

Following the North German Confederation Treaty the Kingdom of Saxony entered the North German Confederation in 1866. As a consequence, the Kingdom returned Deputies to the Reichstag of the North German Confederation. After the founding of the German Empire on 18 January 1871, the deputies were returned to the Reichstag of the German Empire. Following this Saxony participated in Reichstag elections from February 1867. Glauchau-Meerane returned a series of Reichstag Deputies until 1919 when the existing constituencies were scrapped.

The deputies elected for the Glauchau-Meerane Reichstag constituency were as follows:

North German Federation
Election		Reichstag Deputy	Party
February 1867*	1st	Franz Xaver Rewitzer	German Progress Party
August 1867	2nd	Friedrich Wilhelm Emil Försterling	Lasallean General German Workers' Association
Reichstag of the German Empire
1871	1st	Richard Ludwig	German Progress Party
1874	2nd	Johann Most	Social Democratic Workers' Party of Germany
1877	3rd	Johann Most	Socialist Workers' Party of Germany
1878	4th	Louis Wilhelm Vopel	National Liberal Party
1881	5th	Bruno Geiser	Socialist Workers' Party of Germany
1884	6th	Bruno Geiser	Socialist Workers' Party of Germany
1887	7th	Ernst Otto Clauss	National Liberal Party
1890	8th	Max Schippel	Socialist Workers' Party of Germany
1893	9th	Max Schippel	Social Democratic Party of Germany
1898	10th	Max Schippel	Social Democratic Party of Germany
1903	11th	Max Schippel	Social Democratic Party of Germany
1907	12th	Gustav Noske	Social Democratic Party of Germany
1912	13th	Gustav Noske	Social Democratic Party of Germany
