= Gustav Noske =

German politician (1868–1946)

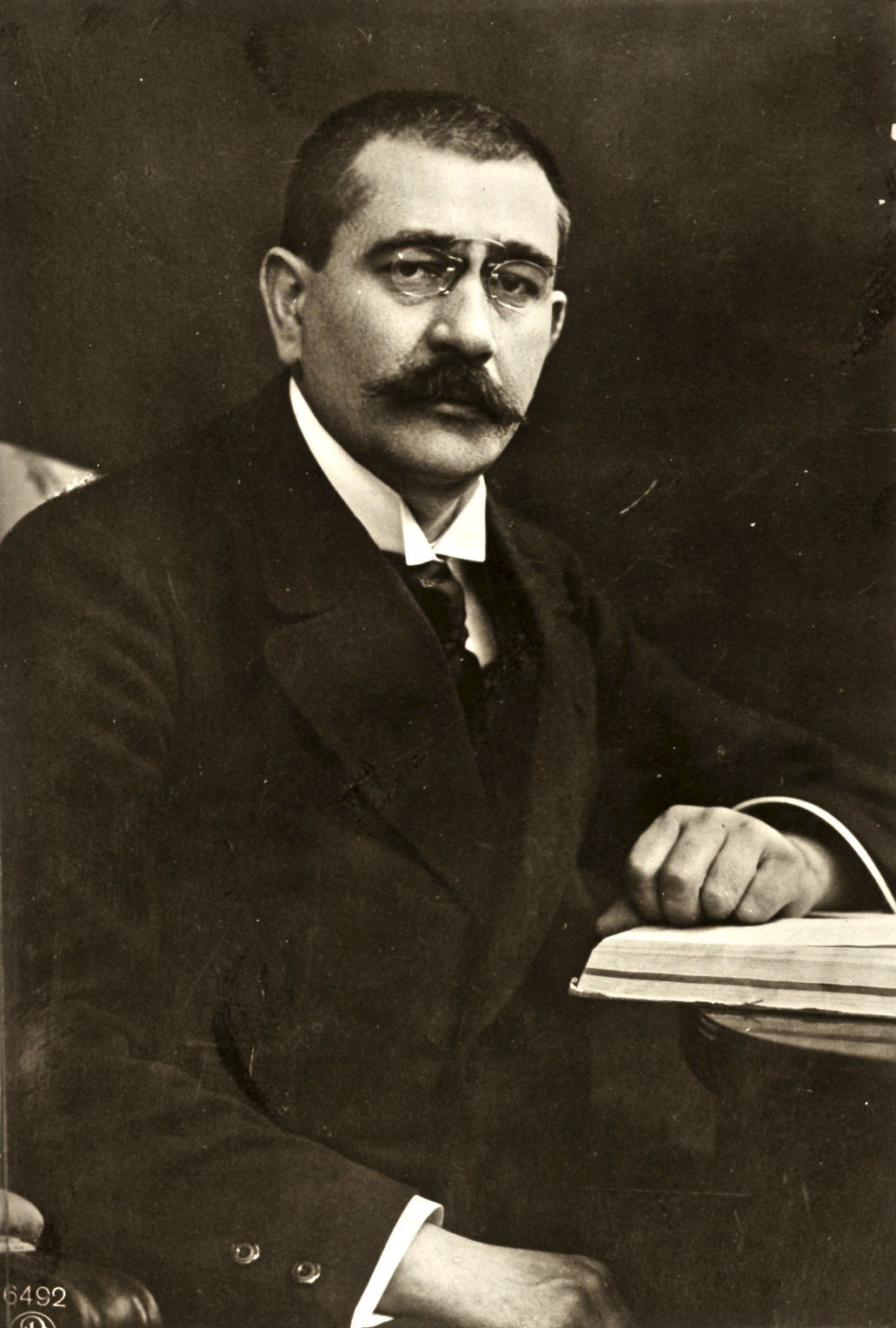
- Noske, c. 1918

Minister of Defence
- In office 13 February 1919 – 22 March 1920
- Chancellor: Philipp Scheidemann; Gustav Bauer
- Preceded by: Office established
- Succeeded by: Otto Gessler

Member of the Reichstag
- In office 1907–1918
- Constituency: Chemnitz

Personal details
- Born: 9 July 1868 Brandenburg an der Havel, Prussia, North German Confederation
- Died: 30 November 1946 (aged 78) Hanover, Lower Saxony, Allied-occupied Germany
- Party: SPD

Gustav Noske (9 July 1868 – 30 November 1946) was a German politician of the Social Democratic Party (SPD). He served as the first Minister of Defence (Reichswehrminister) of the Weimar Republic between 1919 and 1920. Noske was known for using army and paramilitary forces to suppress the socialist/communist uprisings of 1919.

== Early life ==
Noske was born on 9 July 1868 in Brandenburg an der Havel, Prussia. He was the son of the weaver Karl Noske (born 1838) and the manual labourer Emma Noske (née Herwig, born 1843). From 1874 to 1882, he went to primary and secondary school (Volks- and Bürgerschule). From 1882 to 1886, he was apprenticed as a basket maker at the Reichsteinische Kinderwagenfabrik and travelled to Halle, Frankfurt, Amsterdam and Liegnitz as a journeyman. In 1884, Noske joined the Social Democratic Party (SPD) and he also became a union member. In 1892, Noske was elected chairman of the Brandenburg SPD. He married Martha Thiel (1872–1949) at Brandenburg in 1891. They had one son and two daughters.

From 1897 to 1902, Noske was politically active at the local level and worked as an editor at social democratic newspapers in Brandenburg and Königsberg (Volkstribüne). From 1902 to 1918 he was chief editor at the paper Volksstimme in Chemnitz. In the 1907 German federal election, Noske was elected to the Reichstag of the German Empire for the SPD, where he remained through 1918 as representative of the Chemnitz Reichstag constituency.

Within the SPD, he was an expert on military, navy and colonial issues. After 1912, Noske was the Reichstag's co-spokesman for the Navy budget. In 1914, he published a book Kolonialpolitik und Sozialdemokratie in which he argued in favour of German colonialism. He was known as a reformist, one of those in the SPD who wanted to achieve their political goals within the existing system, and as someone who was not much interested in fundamental theoretical debates.

== World War I ==
During World War I, Noske was part of the centre of the SPD, which also included Friedrich Ebert and Philipp Scheidemann, and supported the war as a defensive measure. Noske supported the war loans, but he also argued in favour of a stronger political position for the Reichstag. In 1916 to 1918, he was the parliamentary speaker of a commission appointed by the government to investigate military procurement and related excess profits by contractors (Kommission für die Überprüfung der Kriegslieferungen). In that function, Noske helped to shed light on the business practices involved and to expand the authority of the parliament.

== German Revolution and civil war ==
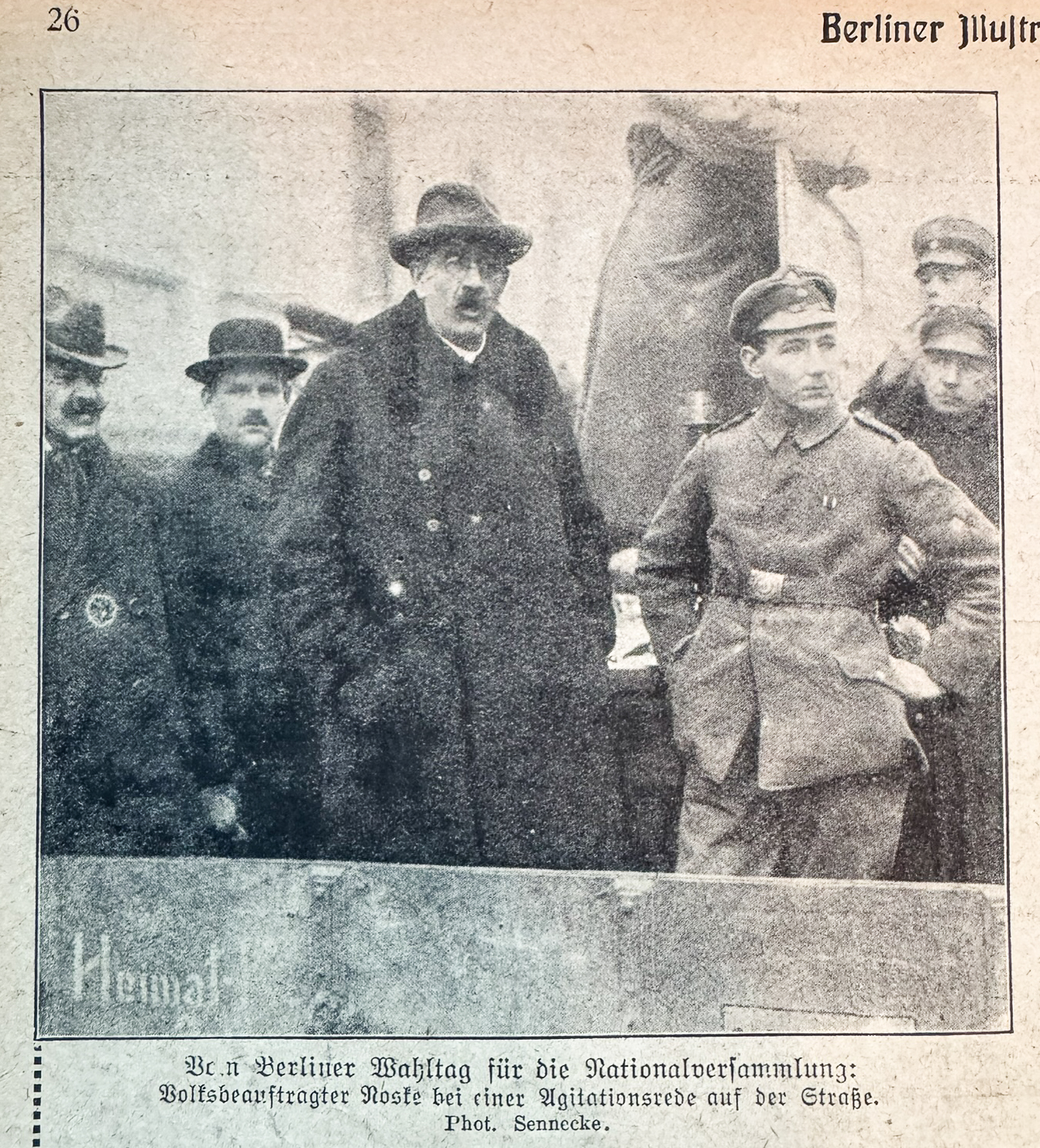
Gustav Noske speaks to a crowd in January 1919.

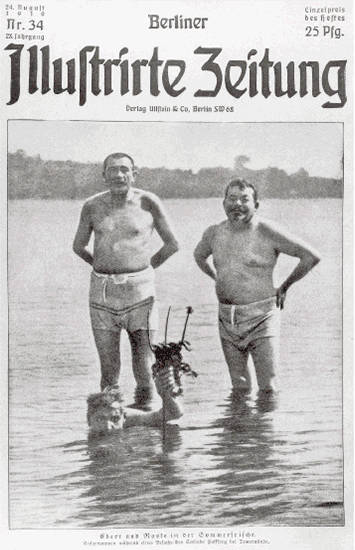
Noske and Friedrich Ebert in the infamous "bathing suit picture", 16 July 1919, Illustrirte Zeitung

In October 1918, Noske became a member of the leadership of the SPD Reichstag group. When the Kiel mutiny started in early November, Prince Max von Baden, the new chancellor, sent Noske to Kiel to negotiate an end to the revolt. The mutineers welcomed Noske and elected him as Chairman of the Soldiers' Council, as they considered him — a Social Democrat — to be on their side. Within days, he had succeeded in restoring the authority of the officers and in making the mutineers who had remained in Kiel resume their normal duties. Max von Baden and his successor as chancellor, Friedrich Ebert, who was a close personal friend of Noske's, were pleased with Noske's achievement. Noske remained in Kiel until December 1918.

As a result of the government's violent response to the revolt by the sailors of the Volksmarinedivision just before Christmas 1918, the representatives of the Independent Social Democrats (USPD) left the revolutionary government of the Council of the People's Deputies (Rat der Volksbeauftragten) at the end of the month, and Noske was one of two Majority Social Democrats who took their place on 30 December. Within the government Noske was responsible for military affairs.

On 5 January 1919, the USPD and the Communist Party of Germany (KPD) called for demonstrations to protest the dismissal of the head of the Berlin police, a USPD member, for supporting the sailors' revolt the preceding Christmas. The demonstration grew into the Spartacist uprising, which had the goal of replacing the national government with a council republic. After the insurgents seized Berlin's city centre and the newspaper district, Ebert attempted to negotiate with them. When the discussions broke down, his major concern was with maintaining internal peace. He ordered the rebellion quashed, and Noske, who was in charge of the Army and Navy, used both regular forces and Freikorps units to end the uprising. Around 165 people lost their lives.

A few days later, on 15 January 1919, members of the Freikorps Garde-Kavallerie-Schützendivision led by Captain Waldemar Pabst abducted and murdered the co-leaders of the KPD, Karl Liebknecht and Rosa Luxemburg. Previously, Noske had personally ordered that Liebknecht's telephone line be monitored and Liebknecht's every movement be reported to Pabst.

On 19 January 1919, elections to the Nationalversammlung (national assembly) were held. It met in Weimar and on 13 February 1919, the newly elected president, Ebert appointed a new government, led by Philipp Scheidemann. Noske became Reichswehrminister (defence minister).

Over the first half of 1919, Ebert and Noske repeated what they had done in Berlin throughout the Reich. Left-wing uprisings were crushed by brutal military force, employing both regular army and paramilitary Freikorps.

As Reichswehrminister in the governments of Philipp Scheidemann and Gustav Bauer, who succeeded Scheidemann as chancellor in June 1919, Noske oversaw the initial reorganisation of the military after the collapse of 1918. Despite substantial misgivings, he ultimately supported the signing of the Treaty of Versailles, which severely curtailed the ability of Germany to maintain an effective military. Beginning in the summer of 1919, there were plots by the Reichswehr leadership to seize power in a military coup. Noske was drawn into these discussions. Although he refused offers to serve as a dictator after a putsch, he never took any steps against the officers who made these offers and failed to report their activities to his fellow members of government.

On 20 January 1920, the Treaty of Versailles came into force, restricting the German army to 100,000 men or less. On 28 February 1920, Noske, following orders of the Military Inter-Allied Commission of Control, which oversaw Germany's compliance with the Treaty, dissolved the Freikorps Marinebrigaden "Ehrhardt" and "Loewenfeld". The highest ranking general of the Reichswehr, Walther von Lüttwitz, refused to comply, resulting in what became known as the Kapp Putsch.

To restore order, Noske asked the chief of the Truppenamt in the Reichswehr Ministry, General Hans von Seeckt, to order the regular army to put down the putsch. Von Seeckt refused and the government was forced to flee from Berlin. However, a general strike called by the unions, the Social Democrats, and the government, as well as the refusal of the bureaucracy to recognise the new (self-declared) chancellor Wolfgang Kapp, resulted in a quick collapse of the coup.

As one of the conditions for ending the general strike, the unions demanded the resignation of Noske as Reichswehrminister. Moreover, some within the SPD were unhappy with his conduct during the crisis and deemed him to have been lacking in energy in dealing with the putsch. He resigned on 22 March 1920. Otto Gessler of the German Democratic Party succeeded him. Noske would be the last Social Democrat in this position during the Weimar Republic.

== Later career and death ==
Noske was Oberpräsident (governor) of the Province of Hanover from 1920 on. During his governorship, the separatist German-Hanoverian Party allegedly pushed for his assassination during the 1924 independence referendum in Hanover; these calls were opposed by virtually every political party active in Prussia. He became more conservative and supported Paul von Hindenburg in the elections for Reichspräsident in 1925 and 1932. Since he was a Social Democrat, the Nazi government relieved him of his duties in the spring of 1933 and then dismissed him on 1 October. Noske then moved to Frankfurt. On 22 July 1944, he was arrested by the Gestapo under suspicion of involvement in the 20 July plot against Adolf Hitler and imprisoned in the Ravensbrück concentration camp. He spent seven months in the camps before being transferred to a regular prison. Noske was freed by advancing Allied troops from a Gestapo prison in Berlin on 22 April 1945.

He died in Hanover on 30 November 1946 from a stroke while preparing for a lecture tour of the United States. He is buried at Stadtfriedhof Engesohde in Hanover.

== Reception ==
Noske has been called "one of the most forceful and at the same time controversial personalities of his time". For some, Noske had the courage to be (in his own words) "the bloodhound" (Note: German Bluthund ("bloodhound") has the figurative meaning "someone who shows himself to be a cruel tyrant") and prevent Germany from falling into chaos and then tyranny of the type previously experienced by Russia after the Bolshevik October Revolution. Another historian called him "a primitive brute, who conducted policy according to a simple friend-foe-pattern" and someone who was "unable to differentiate, who was in love with violence, who from his whole mentality would have fitted better into the NSDAP than into the SPD".
