= Ferdinand Lassalle =

German jurist and socialist (1825–1864)

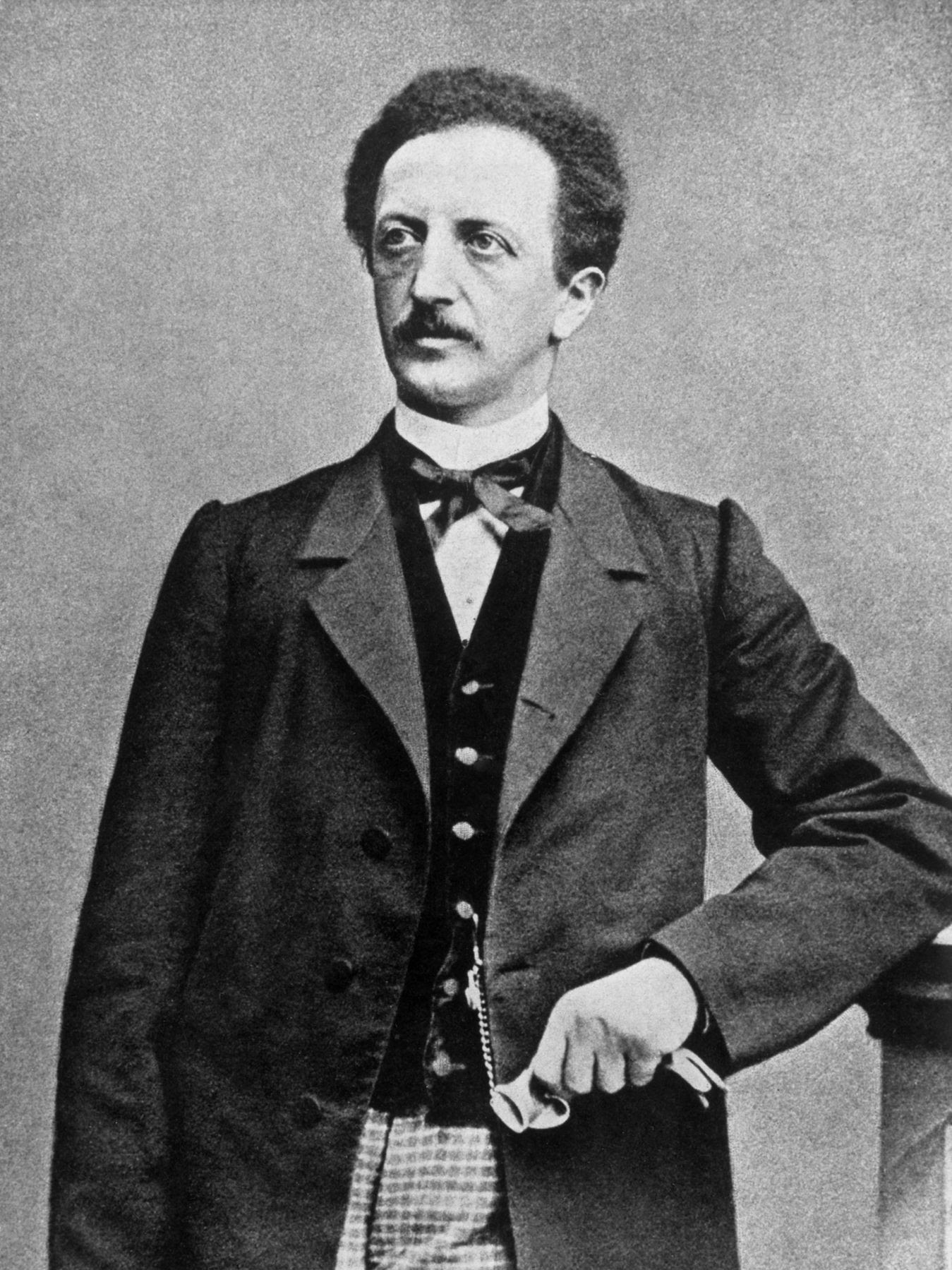
- Lassalle in 1860
- Born: Ferdinand Johann Gottlieb Lassal; 11 April 1825; Breslau, Silesia, Prussia
- Died: 31 August 1864 (aged 39); Carouge, Geneva, Switzerland
- Political party: General German Workers' Association (1863–1864)

Education
- Education: University of Breslau; University of Berlin

Philosophical work
- Era: 19th-century philosophy
- Region: Western philosophy
- School: Hegelianism
- Main interests: Political philosophy; Economics; History
- Notable ideas: Lassalleanism; State socialism; Iron law of wages

Ferdinand Johann Gottlieb Lassalle (11 April 1825 – 31 August 1864) was a German jurist and socialist political leader. Remembered as an initiator of the social democratic movement in Germany, in 1863 he founded the General German Workers' Association (ADAV), the first independent German workers' party. His political theories, a form of state socialism, are known as Lassalleanism.

Born in Breslau to a prosperous Jewish family, Lassalle became a follower of Hegelian philosophy in his youth. During the 1840s and 1850s, he gained public renown for his involvement in a long and sensational legal case to vindicate the rights of Countess Sophie von Hatzfeldt. Active in the revolutions of 1848, he formed a complex and often antagonistic relationship with Karl Marx and Friedrich Engels. Lassalle also authored several major intellectual works, including the philosophical treatise Heraclitus the Obscure (1857) and the legal study The System of Acquired Rights (1861).

Lassalle's political career began in the early 1860s during the Prussian constitutional conflict. Breaking with the liberal progressives, he began a public campaign to establish an independent political party for the working class. His agitation led to the founding of the ADAV, whose platform called for the achievement of socialism through state-aided producers' co-operatives, to be won by universal suffrage. Lassalle's political strategy focused on electoral politics and co-operation with the state, and he entered into secret negotiations with Prussian Minister President Otto von Bismarck in an attempt to forge an alliance between the workers' movement and the conservative Prussian state against the liberal bourgeoisie. His flamboyant and notorious personality, unique in the history of German social democracy, brought him great recognition but also contributed to a leadership style more suited to a demagogue than a democratic leader.

Lassalle's political career was cut short at the age of 39 in 1864 when he was killed in a duel following a dispute over a young woman he wished to marry. Although the ADAV had only a few thousand members at the time of his death, it grew to become a major political force in the German Empire. In 1875, it merged with the Marxist Social Democratic Workers' Party of Germany to form the Social Democratic Party of Germany (SPD). Lassalle's ideas, particularly his statist and nationalist tendencies, exerted a lasting influence on German social democracy, often in conflict with the theories of Marxism.

== Early life and education ==
=== Childhood in Breslau ===
Ferdinand Lassal (he later adopted the French spelling "Lassalle") was born in Breslau (now Wrocław), Silesia, Prussia, on 11 April 1825. His family were Jews, originally domiciled in Poland, who had moved to Prussian Silesia in the late 18th century. His father, Heymann Lassal, who was trained for a rabbinical career, was a prosperous wholesale silk merchant. Ferdinand had a sister, Frederike (Riekchen).

For the New Year of 1840, his father gave him a diary. The boy, not yet fifteen, recorded his activities, faults, and good deeds, aiming to understand his own character. His early diary reveals a precocious, quick-witted boy, capable of warm affection but unscrupulous when he truly wanted something. He was a voracious reader with intense dreams of knight-errantry and glory. He was highly sensitive about the figure he cut, his Jewishness, and his background as the son of a provincial tradesman. The diary shows an early interest in gambling, a keen eye for money, and a casuistic ability to justify his actions, such as playing billiards despite his father's prohibition. He also displayed a precocious interest in romantic intrigues, offering advice to family friends.

The household was often tense due to quick tempers. Ferdinand formed a close alliance with his father, who was often disappointed by his wife's deafness and his daughter's perceived ignorance. However, Heymann himself was quick-tempered, and Ferdinand's dressiness and wilfulness led to friction. One serious quarrel over trousers led to Ferdinand contemplating suicide, an intention his father discerned and gently averted. Heymann generally treated his son as an equal, involving him in family discussions, particularly concerning Riekchen's marriage prospects. Lassalle was unhappy at school. He resented discipline and his reports were often unsatisfactory. To avoid his father's distress, he devised a method of forging his parents' signatures on the school report book. When this deception was nearly discovered, he decided he needed to leave Breslau and persuaded his father to send him to a commercial school in Leipzig.

His diary also reveals early idealistic convictions. He expressed a strong Jewish identity, dreaming of leading the Jews, "sword in hand, along the path to their independence", inspired by characters in Edward Bulwer-Lytton's Leila; or, The Siege of Granada.

=== Leipzig (1840–1841) ===
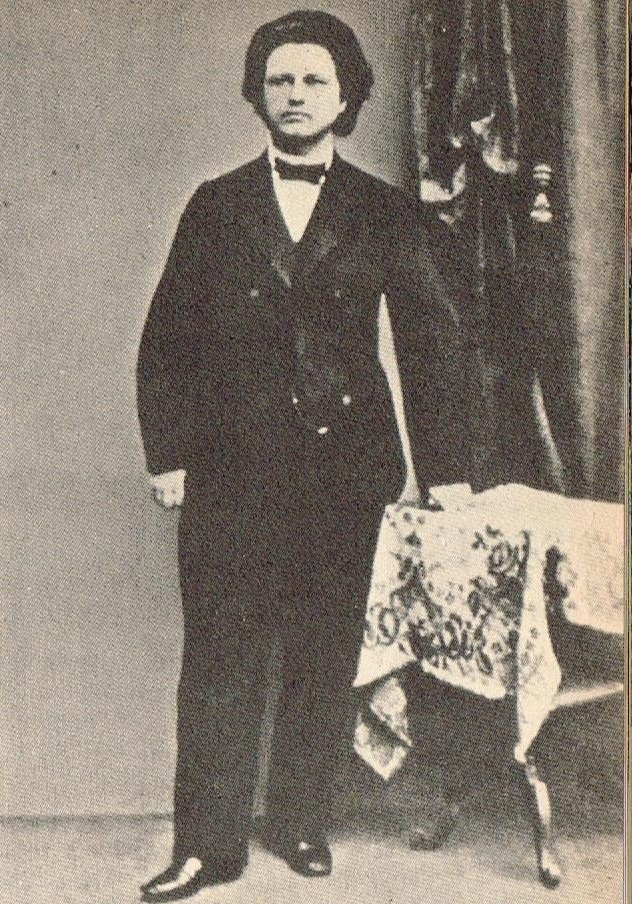
Lasalle in Leipzig, c. 1840

In early May 1840, Ferdinand and his father travelled to Leipzig via Berlin. Heymann arranged for Ferdinand to lodge with Herr Hander, headmaster of a Realschule, at a considerable expense that demonstrated his love for his son. Ferdinand, then fifteen, was treated as a young man of twenty in the Hander household.

In Leipzig, Lassalle was often homesick and exasperated but rarely bored. His diary entries from this period reflect his developing revolutionary fervour, particularly in response to the Damascus affair of 1840: "Cowardly race, you deserve no better fate! ... You were born to be slaves!" he wrote of the Jewish community's response. He read Ludwig Börne's letters, seeing Germany as "one great prison where human rights are trodden under foot". Heinrich Heine's poetry and Friedrich Schiller's play Fiesco also profoundly influenced him. After seeing Fiesco, he reflected with "extraordinarily acute self-criticism": "Had I been born a prince or ruler I should have been an aristocrat, body and soul. But now, as I am only a poor burgher's son, I shall be a democrat in good time". His reading of Johann Wolfgang von Goethe's Wilhelm Meister led him to contrast his own path with Meister's; while Meister renounced trade for Art, Lassalle felt he had renounced an "aesthetic life" for commerce to escape his "horrible position" at home. However, he firmly believed that fate, or Providence, would lead him to a life concerned with "Freedom rather than markets". His ambitions crystallized: "I will proclaim Freedom to the Peoples even if it costs me my life. I swear it by God and beneath the stars ... the blood of princes shall flow".

Life with the Handers became strained as Herr Hander proved pompous and shifty. The death of the Handers' young daughter, Marie, to whom Ferdinand had grown attached, led to an uncomfortable interview where Hander revealed he had intended to ask Ferdinand to leave due to lack of space. School life also saw friction with the director, Schiebe. Ultimately, Lassalle decided against a commercial career. He persuaded his father, during a visit in the summer of 1841, to allow him to study at a university. He declared his intention to study history, "the greatest subject in the world", viewing it as a means to fight for humanity's highest ideals and to "enlighten and illumine" the peoples, rather than as a path to a traditional career.

=== University and Hegelianism ===
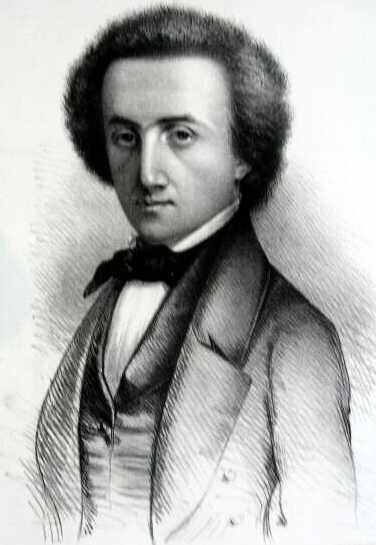
Depiction of a young Lassalle

Between leaving Leipzig and entering university, Lassalle lived at home in Breslau, studying for his matriculation. He developed an "iron determination to study", often remaining indoors for days, immersed in books. After initial refusal, his appeal to the Prussian Minister of Education allowed him to sit the matriculation examination in 1842. Though he impressed examiners with his essay on "The Development of the idea of the Humane", he failed due to the hostility of the presiding Commissioner, Dr. David Schulz. He passed the following year.

Lassalle's university career was divided between the University of Breslau (1843–1844 and summer 1845) and the University of Berlin (1844–1845 and autumn 1845 onwards). It was in his early undergraduate days at Breslau that he discovered Georg Wilhelm Friedrich Hegel. This was a "first big milestone" in his life, providing a creed that gave him "full satisfaction". He described the philosophy as a "second birth" that gave him "clarity, self-assurance ... made of me self-containing Intellect, that is self-conscious God". Hegelian dialectic became an instrument for solving problems in line with his own desires and contributed to his self-assurance, but at the cost of his sense of humour, proportion, and self-criticism. He joined the Raczeks, a Breslau student association dedicated to studying Hegel and his successors like Ludwig Feuerbach and Arnold Ruge, though Lassalle was not an adherent of the Young Hegelians.

In April 1844, Lassalle moved to Berlin, living frugally at 52 Unter den Linden and dedicating himself to an austere regime of study, focusing on Hegel. The philosophy emancipated him from the revolutionary romanticism of Heine and made him a "determined socialist", albeit one who believed the new social order would arise from the "inevitable triumph of the Hegelian idea" rather than from barricades. His study of Hegel also reinforced his high regard for Prussia. He wrote a forty-page letter to his father outlining his Hegelian interpretation of history, industry, and the eventual emergence of a Communist State where "man's subjective individuality will come to real fruition in the conception of the State as an organised whole".

His life in Berlin was not solely academic. He had a love affair with a musician, Lonni Grodzka, whom he helped marry off when he tired of her. He also formed a circle of followers, his "Triumviri": Arnold Mendelssohn (a doctor and cousin of the banking family), Alexander Oppenheim (a young lawyer), and Albert Lehfeldt (a student). Mendelssohn, in particular, fell under Lassalle's intellectual sway, writing letters of intense admiration. Lassalle's ambition at this time was to formulate his own philosophical system, with a work on Heraclitus as a preliminary step to establish his academic reputation.

== The Hatzfeldt affair ==
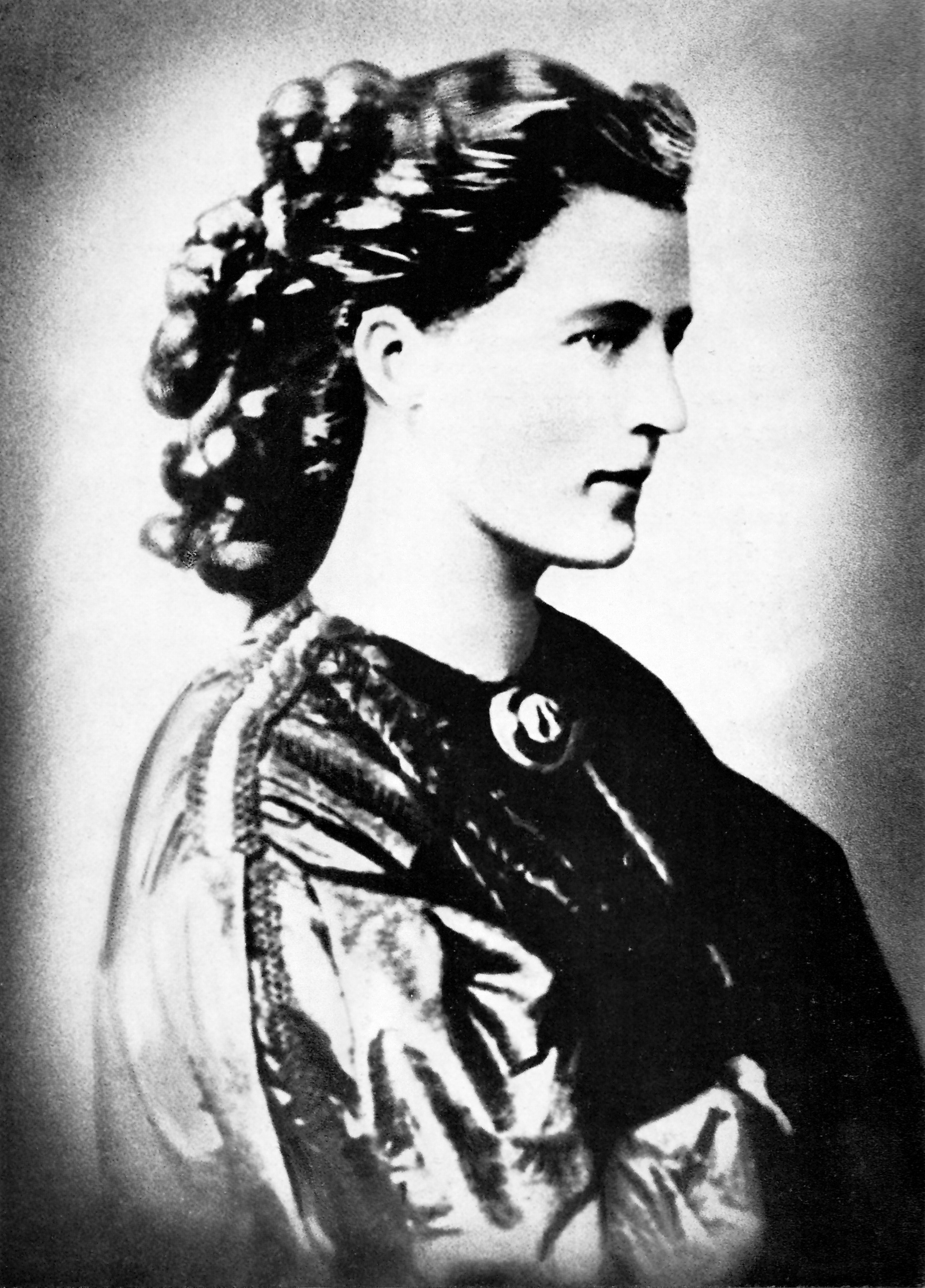
Sophie von Hatzfeldt

In early 1846, Lassalle met Countess Sophie von Hatzfeldt. This was the "second big milestone of his career". The Countess, born in 1805 into a prominent noble family, had been unhappily married since 1822 to her cousin, Count Edmund von Hatzfeldt-Kinsweiler. The Count was unfaithful, unscrupulous in money matters, and had denied her access to their elder children. Having failed to secure help from her family or the Palace, the 41-year-old Countess was, by 1846, a lonely and embittered woman determined to seek legal redress.

Lassalle, introduced to her by a mutual acquaintance from Karl August Varnhagen von Ense's salon, devoted the next eight years almost exclusively to vindicating her claims against her husband. He later described his motivation as that of a "revolutionary of the school of Robespierre", compelled to act against social oppression. His temperament contained an "irrepressible urge towards knight-errantry", and the publicity, the high rank of his client and her opponent, and the considerable interests involved undoubtedly appealed to the "obscure young Jew from the provinces". According to biographer Eduard Bernstein, the affair also appealed to Lassalle because "only the use of extraordinary measures, and the display of extraordinary energy, could bring to a successful issue. What would have repelled others, unquestionably attracted him."

The nature of their personal relationship was a subject of much speculation. Lassalle later told Helene von Dönniges it was "more or less as you say" (implying an early affair), but that their unbreakable bond was "gratitude". In the 1850s, he wrote the Countess a long Hegelian letter arguing there was no physical relationship. In 1857, he gave his word of honour no intimacy had ever taken place. The Countess, in her 1852 will, described Lassalle as "the best of sons". His biographer David Footman concludes that "posterity can only guess at what these words imply... We only know that each remained a major factor in the life of the other".

The campaign involved numerous lawsuits: for alimony, against the Count's "prodigality" with her dowry, and for establishment of domicile for divorce. It became a cause célèbre, fought with polemical articles, libel actions, bought witnesses, and intimidation from both sides. Bernstein characterises the struggle as including "extraordinary measures of underground warfare; the spying, the bribery, the burrowing in the nastiest scandal and filth." He argues that Lassalle did not emerge from the struggle "scatheless" and that the "inverted Augean labours" of the trial permanently affected his character, contributing to a "loss of good taste, that want of moral judgment, henceforth so often shown".

In August 1846, affairs took a sensational turn when Lassalle's associates, Mendelssohn and Oppenheim, attempted to seize a casket from the Count's mistress, Baroness von Meyendorff, believing it contained a deed of gift that would ruin the Countess's son, Paul. This led to Oppenheim's arrest for theft and Mendelssohn's flight to England. Lassalle supported Mendelssohn financially and attempted, unsuccessfully, to enlist Heinrich Heine and Alexander von Humboldt in a press campaign and to secure Oppenheim's release. His father, Heymann, bore the financial strain of these efforts with remarkable patience. Oppenheim was eventually acquitted. Lassalle himself was arrested in March 1847 for complicity in the Oppenheim case but was acquitted after six weeks.

== Revolution of 1848 and aftermath ==
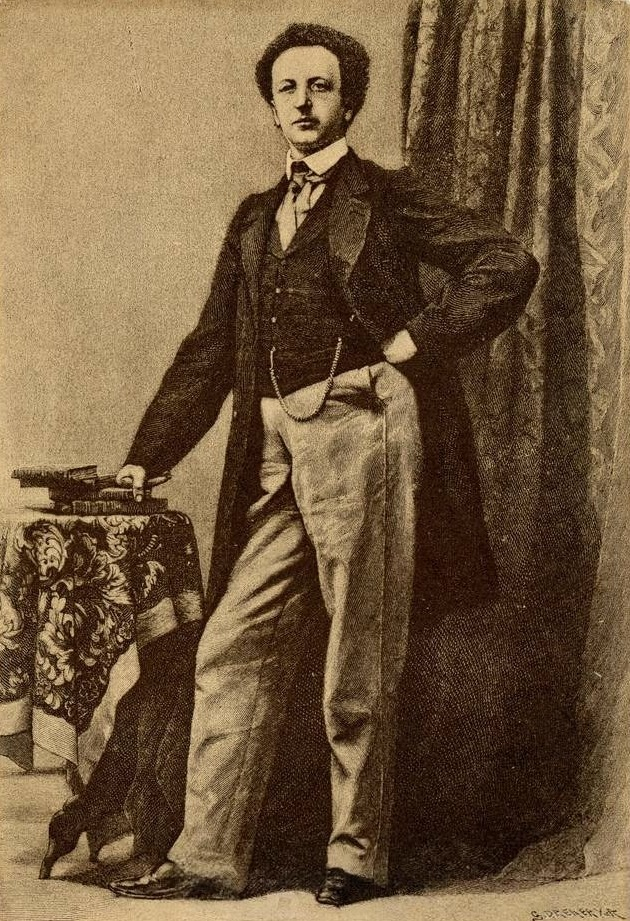
Lassalle c. 1850s

During the revolutions of 1848, Lassalle was briefly imprisoned for his role in the Hatzfeldt affair. On 11 January 1848, he and Countess Hatzfeldt were sentenced to two months' imprisonment for criminal libel, though they appealed. In February, he was arrested in Potsdam for complicity in the theft of certain documents related to the case and transferred to Cologne. At his trial in August 1848, Lassalle delivered a "spirited counter-attack", skilfully identifying his cause with Liberty and Democracy, and was acquitted. This was hailed as a triumph for the Left in the Rhineland.

It was during this period that Lassalle met Karl Marx and Friedrich Engels. Marx was editor of the Neue Rheinische Zeitung in Cologne. Engels disliked Lassalle from the start, disapproving of his "glibness, ostentation and self-importance", and the Hatzfeldt scandal. Marx, while aware of these foibles, was more tolerant, appreciating Lassalle's drive and intellectual capacity. Lassalle made his first public political speech on 29 August 1848, at a protest meeting in Cologne against the arrest of the revolutionary poet Ferdinand Freiligrath. He became active in the Rhineland, in frequent touch with Marx.

In November 1848, following government moves against the Constituent Assembly in Berlin, Lassalle advocated armed resistance and was arrested on a charge of inciting the populace to arms. He remained in custody for six months. At his trial in May 1849, he was acquitted of the main charge but was immediately rearrested for inciting violence against authorities and remained in custody for two more months. He was eventually sentenced in July 1849 to six months' imprisonment, which he did not serve until over a year later. For his main trial, Lassalle prepared a speech later published as the "Assize Court Speech", though it was never actually delivered as the court decided to exclude the public.

After his release in 1849, Lassalle remained in the Rhineland, "the last of the Mohicans", as Marx and other Left-wing leaders went into exile. He maintained a warm correspondence with Marx and his wife Jenny, offering support during their early, impoverished years in London. Lassalle served his six-month prison sentence from October 1850 to April 1851. During this time, Marx suggested Lassalle for membership in the Communist League, but the Cologne committee, led by Heinrich Bürgers (who had past friction with Lassalle over the Hatzfeldt affair), rejected the proposal "in view of Lassalle's reputation". Lassalle was unaware of this. After the Cologne Communist Trial in late 1851, where Bürgers and others were imprisoned, Lassalle, who was not implicated, supported them and their dependents.

In 1854, the Hatzfeldt affair finally concluded. Through intrigue and blackmail involving the Count's estate agent, Stockum, Lassalle forced Count Hatzfeldt into an acceptable financial settlement. Countess Hatzfeldt received over 300,000 thalers. Lassalle himself secured an annuity of 4,000 thalers from these funds (later increased to 7,000 thalers), an arrangement he later explained was compensation for his sacrifices and to ensure he was not under too great an obligation to the Countess. For the rest of his life, he could live as a rich man.

== "Man of means" and intellectual development ==
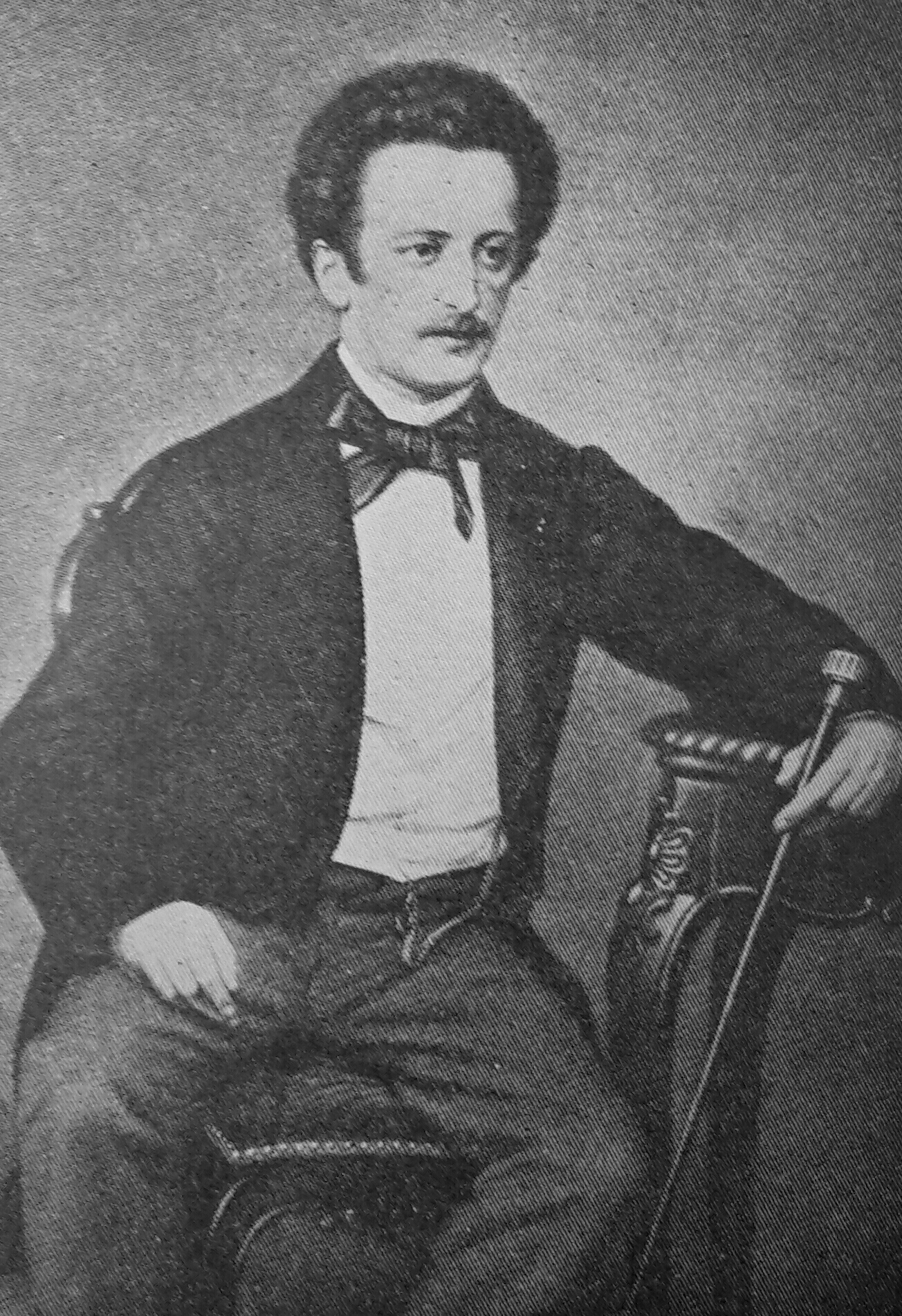
Portrait of Lassalle, c. 1860

Following the Hatzfeldt settlement, Lassalle initially stayed in Düsseldorf with the Countess, maintaining his connections with local workers. He entered into an affair with Agnes Dennis-Street, daughter of Georg Klindworth, a political intelligence agent. Klindworth became a source of information for Lassalle, useful for both political insights (which he passed to Marx) and stock exchange speculation. Agnes gave birth to Lassalle's daughter in 1855. Lassalle's relationship with Countess Hatzfeldt entered a period of crisis, as he was ambitious and she feared a lonely old age. Her son Paul also resented Lassalle. He desired to move to Berlin to work on his long-planned book on Heraclitus and to play the lion in its salons, but police permission was repeatedly denied. In 1856, Lassalle undertook an Eastern tour with his brother-in-law Friedland, visiting Budapest, Belgrade, Bucharest, and Constantinople. During this trip, he learned of Arnold Mendelssohn's death in the Crimean War, which deeply moved him. The tour was cut short due to the Countess's financial worries caused by a stock market slump.

Meanwhile, his relationship with Marx deteriorated. In 1853, Marx received an unfavorable report about Lassalle from a certain Wiss. In 1855, Gustav Lewy, a Düsseldorf democrat, denounced Lassalle to Marx in London, accusing him of exploiting the workers' party for his private affairs and of dangerous political maneuvering. Although no further evidence was forthcoming, Marx was "deeply impressed" and retained a sense of mistrust.

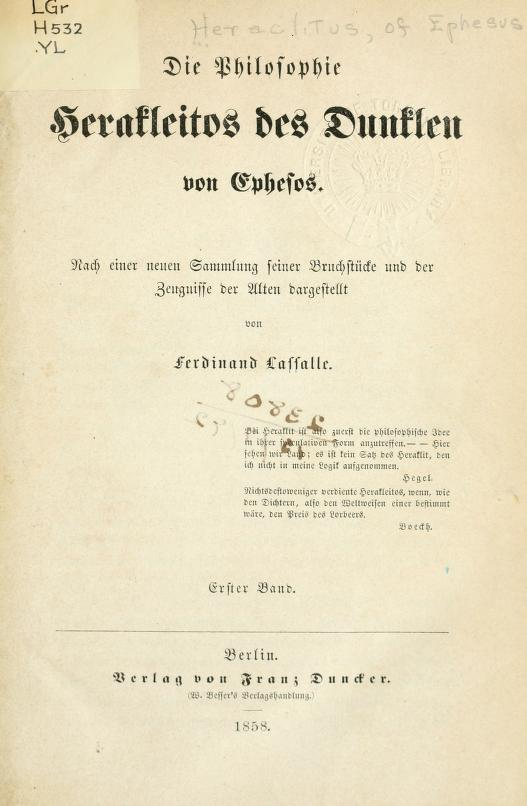
Title page of Heraclitus the Obscure, the Philosopher of Ephesus (1857)

In 1857, through the intervention of Alexander von Humboldt, Lassalle finally obtained a six-month permit to reside in Berlin for medical treatment and the publication of his work on Heraclitus. He re-established contact with Marx, sending him his Heraclitus the Obscure, the Philosopher of Ephesus (Die Philosophie Herakleitos des Dunklen von Ephesos), which was published in two volumes in 1857. The work, a Hegelian interpretation of the Ephesian philosopher, was well-received in Berlin academic circles, earning praise from Humboldt, Varnhagen, and Karl Richard Lepsius, and leading to his membership in the Berlin Philosophical Society. Marx, however, found it "masterly" but too verbose and insufficiently critical of Hegel. To Engels, Marx was more dismissive, calling it a "feeble composition" displaying erudition but lacking originality, and a diluted version of the relevant part of Hegel's History of Philosophy. Lassalle remained unaware of Marx's private criticisms. Bernstein notes that the book displays Lassalle's strong Hegelian belief in the state as the "realisation of the universal actual Will" and a passionate desire for fame, which he saw as "the immortality of man attained and made real."

His social life in Berlin included an affair with Lina Duncker, wife of his publisher Franz Duncker. This, and other social activities, caused friction with the Countess. An altercation with an army officer, Fabrice, a rival for Lina Duncker's affections, led to a public scandal and a police expulsion order from Berlin. Lassalle successfully appealed this order, partly through a petition to Prince Wilhelm of Prussia. His daughter by Agnes Dennis-Street died in September 1857, an event that seems to have had little impact on him.

In 1859, Lassalle published a blank verse tragedy, Franz von Sickingen, and a pamphlet on foreign politics, The Italian War and Prussia's Duty: Democracy's Call. Franz von Sickingen depicted the Knights' Revolt leader as a revolutionary figure, with the character of Ulrich von Hutten reflecting Lassalle's own persona. Marx criticized the play for its feudal protagonist, its abstract idealism, and for neglecting the role of the peasantry, suggesting peasant leaders would have been more appropriate. The pamphlet on the Italian War advocated Prussian neutrality and eventual incorporation of Schleswig-Holstein, differing significantly from Marx and Engels' pro-Austrian, anti-Bonapartist stance. Lassalle later explained to Marx that his goal was not pro-Prussian nationalism, but to prevent a "popular war against France" which he feared would be "dangerous... for our revolutionary development." These disagreements further strained his relationship with Marx, exacerbated by Lassalle's handling of Marx's financial requests and his perceived condescension in a conflict between Marx and Carl Vogt. The tension culminated in Marx sending Lassalle copies of Lewy's 1855 denunciation, which deeply wounded him.

In 1860, Lassalle became involved with Sonia Sontsev (Sophie von Solutzew), a young Russian woman he met at a spa in Aachen. He wrote her a sixty-page letter proposing marriage, detailing his life, his Jewishness (which he described ambivalently), his relationship with Countess Hatzfeldt (whom he hoped Sonia would live with), and the dangers of a political life. Sonia ultimately rejected his proposal. His major legal work, The System of Acquired Rights (Das System der erworbenen Rechte), was published in 1861. A philosophical and historical treatise, it argued against conservative legal theorists like Friedrich Carl von Savigny that acquired rights could lose their validity. Lassalle contended that legal systems derive their legitimacy from the evolving consciousness of the nation (the Volksgeist), and that new laws reflecting this consciousness could legitimately extinguish older privileges forbidden by them. Its reception was tepid.

== Political agitation and the ADAV ==
In the view of Polish intellectual historian Leszek Kołakowski, "Lassalle's activity as a politician and ideologist of the workers' movement began, properly speaking, in 1862 and lasted (owing to his early death) for little more than two years." Despite the shortness of this period of activity, Lassalle's ideological influence in the German labor movement "outclassed" that of Marx for a number of years, in Kołakowski's estimation.

The early 1860s saw a growing constitutional conflict in Prussia over army reform. Lassalle saw an opportunity for political action. In April 1862, he delivered two influential lectures in Berlin: "The Nature of Constitutions" and "The Working Class and its Significance in the Present Age" (later published as The Workers' Programme). In these, he argued that a constitution is merely the "factual power relationship in any given society" written down, and that the working class, the "Fourth Estate", was destined to become the dominant social force due to its "profound instinct" for the true destiny of the State as an ethical institution for human development. He advocated for the working class to form its own independent political party. Bernstein described The Workers' Programme as a "paraphrase of the Communist Manifesto, adapted to the time and circumstances", but noted that Lassalle's Hegelianism and juridical viewpoint led him to a "veritable cult" of the state, which became the "Achilles heel of all ideology". These speeches caused a stir and led to police confiscation of The Workers' Programme and charges against Lassalle.

In late 1862, a committee of Leipzig workers, disillusioned with the liberal Progressives' refusal to grant them full membership in the Nationalverein or support universal suffrage, approached Lassalle, asking him to lead a new workers' movement. The historian Gary P. Steenson argues that the nascent movement "made" Lassalle rather than the other way around; he was sought out by the workers for his authority and learning to counter the influence of liberals like Franz Hermann Schulze-Delitzsch. Lassalle responded with his Open Letter to the Central Committee for the Convening of a General German Workers' Congress in Leipzig (Offnes Antwortschreiben) in March 1863. In it, he reiterated the impotence of the Progressives and outlined his program: the formation of an independent workers' party advocating for universal, equal, and direct suffrage. He famously attacked Schulze-Delitzsch's self-help co-operatives as inadequate and proposed instead state-financed producers' co-operatives. He also expounded his "iron law of wages", arguing that under capitalism, average wages are always driven down to the bare minimum of subsistence. Only through state aid and universal suffrage could the working class achieve emancipation.

The Open Letter became the founding document of the General German Workers' Association (ADAV), established in Leipzig on 23 May 1863, with Lassalle as its president for a five-year term. The ADAV was the first organized German workers' party. The party's statutes gave the president dictatorial powers, a feature that Lassalle's successors inherited as part of his "enduring legacy". His leadership style was that of a demagogue rather than a democratic leader, and his conception of democracy was based on a vague, Jacobin notion of the collective will rather than on representative institutions. Lacking the patience for detailed organizational work, he was an effective speaker and agitator but relied on his pre-existing audience. Recruitment was slow; by the time of his death, the ADAV had only about 4,600 members.

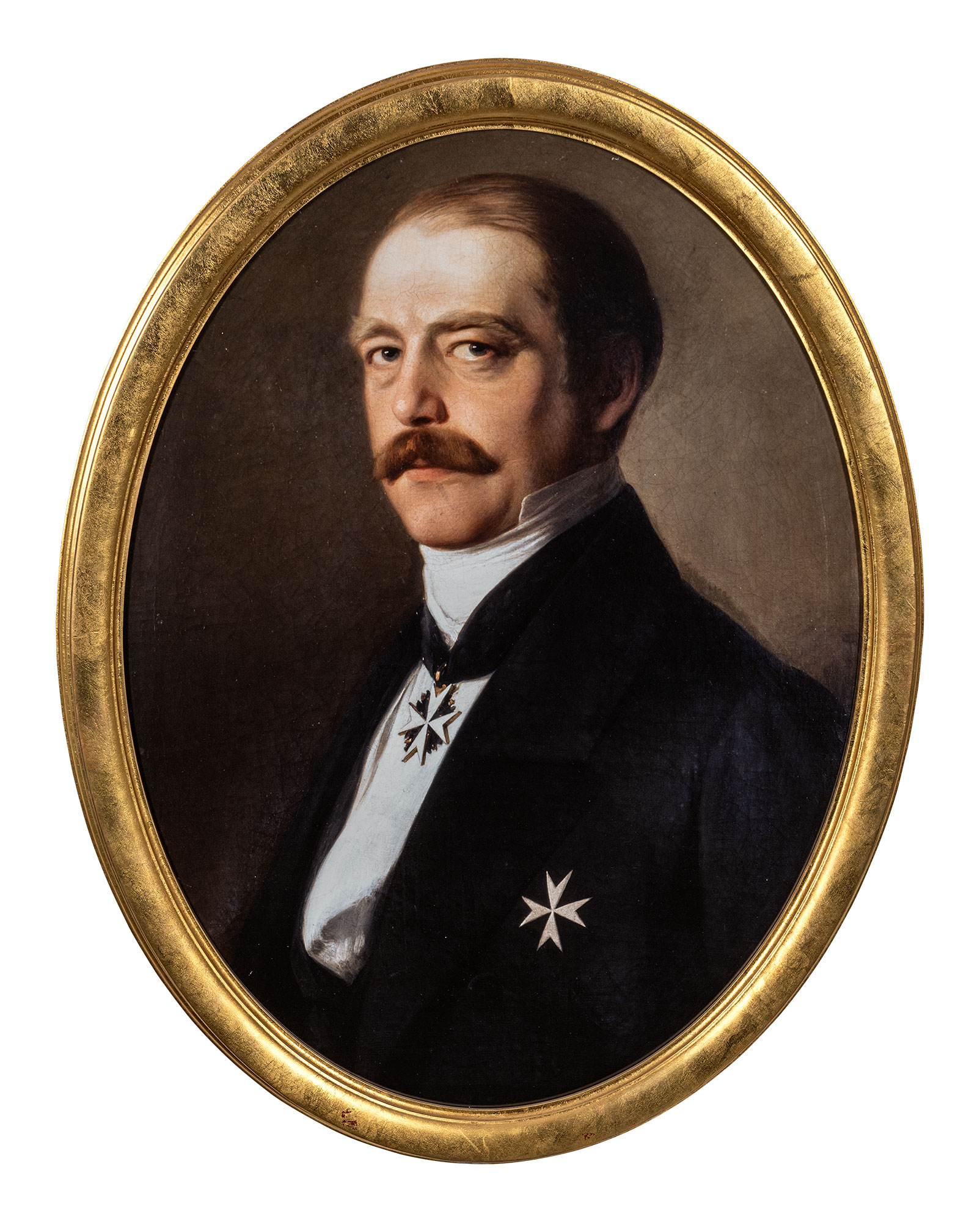
Otto von Bismarck

During this period, Lassalle's hostility to liberalism brought him into a series of confidential meetings and correspondence with Otto von Bismarck, the Prussian Minister President. The first meeting, at Bismarck's invitation, took place in May 1863. Bismarck sought to use the new workers' movement to crush liberal opposition. Lassalle hoped to persuade Bismarck to introduce universal suffrage, believing it would benefit both the Crown and the workers against the bourgeoisie. He even suggested that the working class might support a "social dictatorship" by the Crown against bourgeois society. The exact nature of their discussions remained secret, but Lassalle's overtures to the conservative state and his nationalist sentiments were viewed with deep suspicion by Marx and other socialists. His relationship with Marx finally broke down completely in November 1862 over a misunderstanding about a loan.

Lassalle continued his agitation throughout 1863 and 1864, delivering powerful speeches, notably at Frankfurt and Ronsdorf. His pamphlet Herr Bastiat-Schulze von Delitzsch, the Economic Julian, Or Capital and Labour (1864) was a polemical attack on Schulze-Delitzsch that also, paradoxically, did much to popularise Marxian concepts of capital and labour and prepare the German movement for the reception of Marxism. He faced ongoing legal battles; he was convicted for The Workers' Programme (sentence commuted to a fine) and later for his Ronsdorf speech (sentenced to imprisonment, pending appeal). At his trial for high treason in March 1864, Lassalle publicly predicted that Bismarck would "play the part of Robert Peel" and grant universal suffrage within a year. In June 1864, before leaving Berlin, Lassalle told his followers that the party must regard the bourgeoisie as "the only enemy" and be prepared to ally with the monarchy if necessary. According to one view, Lassalle in his final months abandoned his revolutionary socialist goals in favour of trying to win concessions from the government, opting for "the simpler and rapider method of converting Bismarck and the Prussian Ministry".

== Final months and death ==
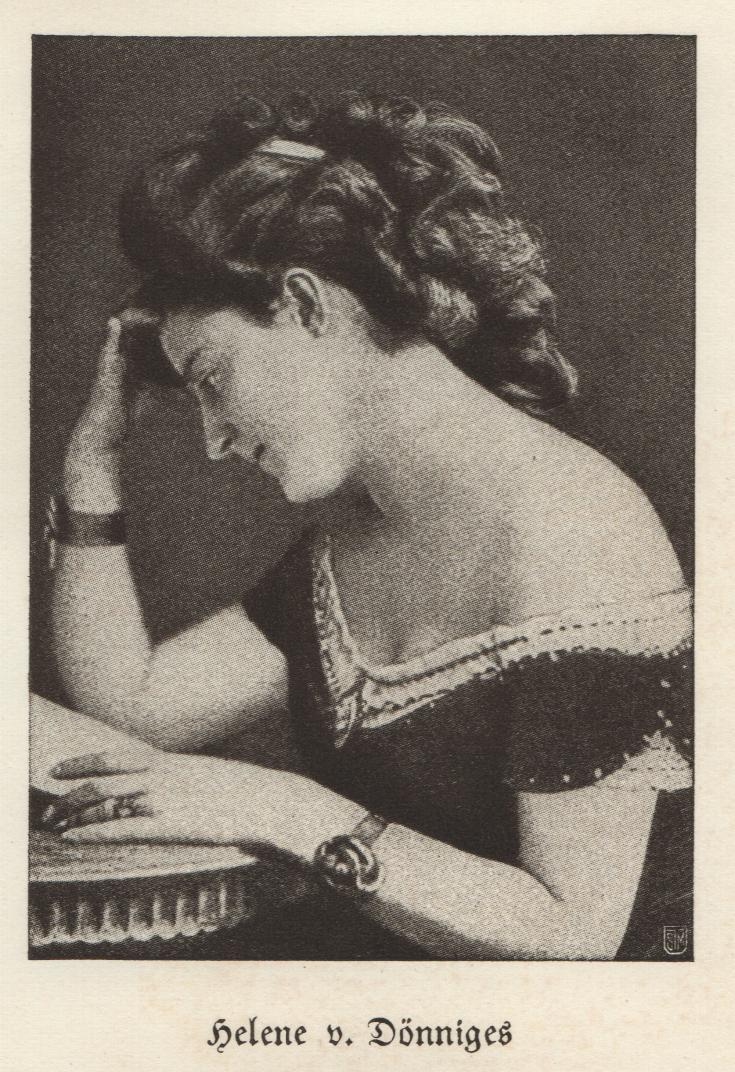
Helene von Dönniges

In the summer of 1864, Lassalle was on a health cure at Rigi Kaltbad in Switzerland. While there, he re-encountered Helene von Dönniges, a young woman he had met briefly before. Helene was the daughter of Wilhelm von Dönniges, a Bavarian diplomat. A whirlwind romance ensued, and Lassalle proposed marriage. Helene accepted, writing to him: "I intend to be your wife. You asked me for a 'yes et je m'en charge'. Here is my 'yes', chargez-vous". However, Helene's family, particularly her father, vehemently opposed the match due to Lassalle's Jewish origins, his political notoriety, and the perceived social mésalliance. When Helene returned to her family in Geneva, she was effectively held captive and pressured to renounce Lassalle. Lassalle, in Geneva, attempted to secure her release and her parents' consent, enlisting the help of Countess Hatzfeldt and others, and even seeking the intervention of Bavarian authorities through his acquaintance Baron von Schrenk.

After weeks of intense emotional struggle, during which Lassalle sent frantic letters and telegrams, Helene eventually capitulated to her family's pressure and wrote a letter to Lassalle renouncing him in favour of a previous suitor, Yanko von Rakowitza, a young Wallachian nobleman. Bernstein described Lassalle during this period as having a "completely shattered" nervous system, displaying "extreme weakness" through his "anxiety to move heaven and earth about every petty matter". Feeling his honour impugned and publicly humiliated, Lassalle challenged Helene's father to a duel. Herr von Dönniges declined, but Rakowitza accepted the challenge in his stead.

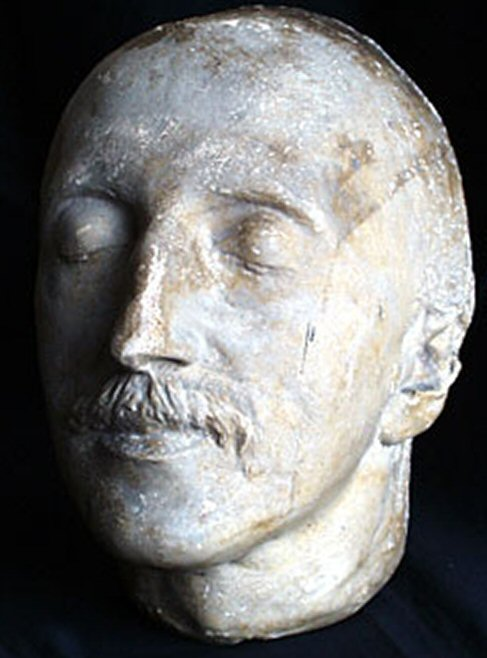
Lassalle's death mask

The duel took place on the morning of 28 August 1864, in Carouge, a suburb of Geneva. Lassalle had little pistol practice, while Rakowitza, though not a marksman, had spent the previous afternoon in intensive training. Rakowitza fired first and hit Lassalle in the abdomen. Lassalle's return shot missed. Lassalle lingered for three days, heavily drugged with opium, and died on the morning of 31 August 1864, at the age of 39.

Lassalle's death caused a sensation. The ADAV, suddenly deprived of its founder and leader, fell into a period of "violent dissension over policy, organisation, and leadership" that almost led to its disintegration. His body was embalmed and taken by Countess Hatzfeldt in a solemn procession down the Rhine, where vast crowds of workers mourned him. He was eventually buried in the Jewish Cemetery in Breslau. Countess Hatzfeldt devoted the rest of her life (until her death in 1881) to defending Lassalle's memory and fostering his cult within and outside the ADAV. Helene von Dönniges married Yanko von Rakowitza, who died a few months later; she subsequently had two more husbands and a stage career, eventually committing suicide.

== Views ==
=== Homosexuality ===
Lassalle defended a homosexual member of his party, Johann Baptista von Schweitzer, who was attacked because of his sexual orientation. Marx and Engels wrote about Schweitzer in a pejorative manner and made jokes about his homosexuality, and members of the ADAV refused to let him speak. Lassalle on the other hand defended Schweitzer against such attacks:

Such behavior against a man of your character and your intelligence only proves how confused and narrow-minded the political ideas of our people still are. I, for my part at least, whatever the members of our Association may say, will never hide the fact that I have the highest respect for you and set the highest value on yours, and I therefore leave it to you to show this letter to whomever you wish.

Lassalle also responded by walking with Schweitzer, arm in arm, through Frankfurt. He reminded his contemporaries that in Ancient Greece homosexuality was socially acceptable: "However incomprehensible such unnatural tastes appear to us, the tendency of which Dr. von Schweitzer is accused was the general rule among the ancient Greeks, their statesmen and their philosophers. Ancient Greece saw nothing wrong in it, and I consider the great Greek philosophers and the Greek people knew the meaning of morality."

== Legacy ==
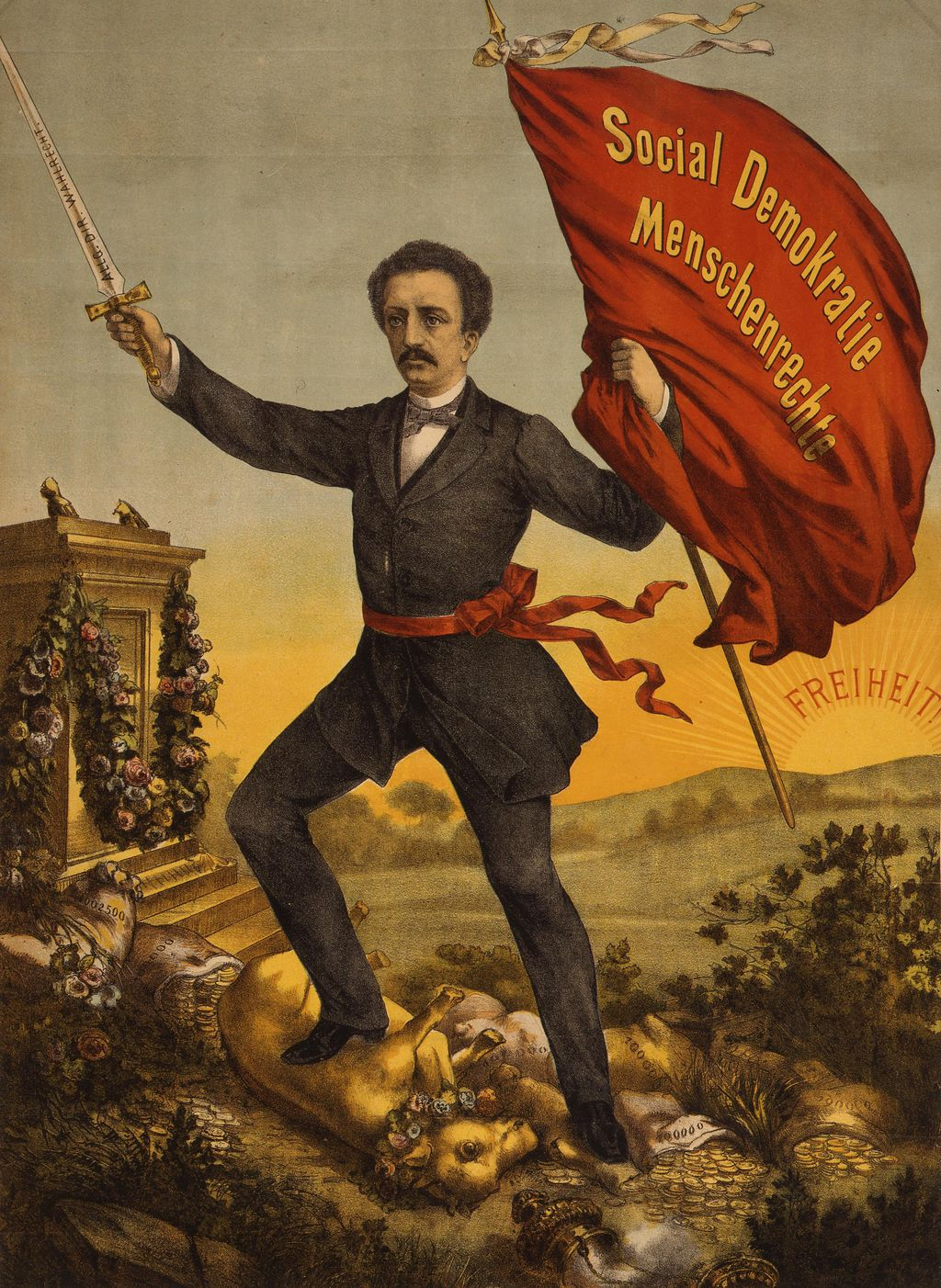
Poster depicting Lassalle destroying the "golden calf" of capital, c. 1870

Marx and Engels, while acknowledging Lassalle's importance, were critical. Engels lamented the loss of "one of the most important men in Germany" but Marx, in private letters, expressed relief that their strained relations were over and strongly condemned Lassalle's tactics, alleged plagiarism of his writings, and his "vanity, braggadocio". Marx also felt Lassalle's state socialism was a misunderstanding of his own theories. Marx's and Lassalle's followers and intellectual heirs would continue to hold differing opinions on their respective theories. Eduard Bernstein, for instance, argued that the differences were mainly political and tactical, while Karl Kautsky insisted that Lassalle's socialism was of a completely different kind.

Despite its small membership at his death, the ADAV grew under the leadership of Johann Baptist von Schweitzer, who continued Lassalle's "centralised organisation, nationalistic outlook, and pro-governmental tactics". In 1875, it merged with the Social Democratic Workers' Party (founded by August Bebel and Wilhelm Liebknecht) at the Gotha Congress to form what eventually became the Social Democratic Party of Germany (SPD). The Gotha Program adopted by the new party was heavily influenced by Lassallean theories, such as the demand for state-aided co-operatives, which was reaffirmed "despite strong private opposition from Marx".

Lassalle remains a controversial figure. He is credited with popularizing socialist ideas among German workers and creating their first political organization. His emphasis on achieving socialism through the existing state via universal suffrage, his nationalism, and his dealings with Bismarck distinguish his approach from Marxism. The influence of "Lassalleanism", including a highly developed hostility toward liberalism, continued to be a major tendency in German socialism long after his death. Even Liebknecht and Bebel had to make concessions to Lassalle's enormous prestige; in 1868, for instance, Liebknecht edited an article by Engels to remove passages derogatory to Lassalle. The persistence of his ideas and the cult that grew around his personality demonstrated that, for many German workers, Lassalle's ideas were not seen as incompatible with Marx's; one party publication in 1872 even depicted Marx and Lassalle on either side of Liebknecht.

Engels later wrote that Lassalle's "immortal service" was to "re-awaken the workers' movement in Germany after fifteen years of slumber", but maintained that his historical role remained "equivocal", with "Lassalle the socialist... accompanied step by step by Lassalle the demagogue". Bernstein concluded that while Lassalle's agitation failed in its immediate aims, "it brought the working-class nearer to the goal... to have trained them for the fight, to have, as the song says, given them swords, this remains the great, the undying merit of Ferdinand Lassalle."

== Works ==
=== German editions ===
- Die Philosophie Herakleitos des Dunklen von Ephesos (The Philosophy of Heraclitus the Obscure of Ephesus) Berlin: Franz Duncker, 1858.
- Der italienische Krieg und die Aufgabe Preussens: eine Stimme aus der Demokratie (The Italian War and the Tasks of Prussia: A Voice of Democracy). Berlin: Franz Duncker, 1859.
- Das System der erworbenen Rechte (The System of Acquired Rights). Two volumes. Leipzig: 1861.
- Über Verfassungswesen: zwei Vorträge und ein offenes Sendschreiben (On The Essence of a Constitution: Two Lectures and an Open Letter). Berlin: 1862.
- Offenes Antwortschreiben an das Zentralkomitee zur Berufung eines Allgemeinen Deutschen Arbeiter-Kongresses zu Leipzig (Open Letter Answering the Central Committee on the Convening of a General German Workers' Congress in Leipzig). Zürich: Meyer and Zeller, 1863.
- Zur Arbeiterfrage: Lassalle's Rede bei der am 16. April in Leipzig abgehaltenen Arbeiterversammlung nebst Briefen der Herren Professoren Wuttke und Dr. Lothar Bucher. (On the Labor Problem: Lassalle's Speech on the 16th of April [1863] at a Leipzig Workers' Meeting, Together with the Letters of Professor Wuttke and Dr. Lothar Bucher). Leipzig: 1863.
- Herr Bastiat-Schulze von Delitzsch, der ökonomische Julian, oder Kapital und Arbeit (Mr. Bastiat-Schulze von Delitzsch, the Economic Julian, or, Capital and Labour). Berlin: Reinhold Schlingmann, 1864.
- Reden und Schriften (Speeches and Writings). In three volumes. New York: Wolff and Höhne, n.d. [1883].
- Gesammelte Reden und Schriften (Collected Speeches and Writings). In 12 volumes. Berlin: P. Cassirer, 1919–1920.
  - vol. 1 | vol. 2 | vol. 3 | vol. 4 | vol. 5 | vol. 6 | vol. 7 | vol. 8 | vol. 9 | vol. 10 | vol. 11 | vol. 12

=== English translations ===
- The Working Man's Programme: An Address. Edward Peters, trans. London: The Modern Press, 1884.
- What is Capital? F. Keddell, trans. New York: New York Labor News Co., 1900.
- Lassalle's Open Letter to the National Labor Association of Germany. John Ehmann and Fred Bader, trans. New York: International Library Publishing, 1901. Originally published in US in 1879.
- Franz von Sickingen: A Tragedy in Five Acts. Daniel DeLeon, trans. New York: New York Labor News, 1904.
- Voices of Revolt, Volume 3: Speeches of Ferdinand Lassalle with a Biographical Sketch. Introduction by Jakob Altmaier. New York: International Publishers, 1927.

== See also ==
- International Workingmen's Association
- Night-watchman state
- Pierre-Joseph Proudhon, French contemporary anarchist theorist

== Notes ==
=== Works cited ===
- Bernstein, Eduard (1893). Ferdinand Lassalle as a Social Reformer. London: Swan Sonnenschein & Co.
- Footman, David (1947). Ferdinand Lassalle: Romantic Revolutionary. New Haven: Yale University Press. OCLC 186524436. (Reprinted 1969 by Greenwood Press, ISBN 9780837123588; and 1994 by Transaction Publishers, ISBN 9781560007677)
- Kołakowski, Leszek (1978). Main Currents of Marxism, Vol. 1: The Founders. Oxford: Clarendon Press. ISBN 0-19-824547-5.
- Morgan, Roger (1965). The German Social Democrats and the First International, 1864–1872. Cambridge: Cambridge University Press. OCLC 459424888.
- Steenson, Gary P. (1981). Not One Man! Not One Penny!: German Social Democracy, 1863–1914. Pittsburgh: University of Pittsburgh Press. ISBN 0-8229-3440-X.
