= Queens University of Charlotte =

Private university in North Carolina, US

Coordinates: 35.1888°N 80.8323°W

- Former names: Charlotte Female Institute (1857–1890); Long's Seminary (1891–1896); Presbyterian College for Women (1896–1912); Queens College (1912–1930, 1940–2002); Queens–Chicora College (1930–1939)
- Motto: Non ministrari sed ministrare (Latin)
- Motto in English: Not to be served but to serve
- Type: Private university
- Established: 1857; 169 years ago
- Affiliations: APCU; CIC; NAICU
- Religious affiliation: Presbyterian Church (U.S.A.)
- Endowment: $185 million
- Faculty: 123 full-time, 109 part-time (fall 2024)
- Students: 1,599 (fall 2024)
- Undergraduates: 1,225
- Postgraduates: 374
- Location: Charlotte, North Carolina, US
- Campus: Urban
- Newspaper: The Queens Chronicle
- Colors: Blue and gold
- Nickname: Royals
- Sporting affiliations: NCAA Division I – ASUN Conference
- Mascot: Rex the Royal
- Website: queens.edu

Queens University of Charlotte is a private university in Charlotte, North Carolina, United States. The university is affiliated with the Presbyterian Church (USA).

In 2025, Queens University and Elon University announced their impending merger, with Step One being approved in June 2026 by their accreditor, the Southern Association of Colleges and Schools Commission on Colleges (SACSCOC), leaving Elon University in full control of Queens.

== History ==
Founded in 1857 as the Charlotte Female Institute, this private school was originally located in what is now Uptown Charlotte. It was started and operated by Rev. Robert Burwell and his wife Margaret Anna Burwell. Elizabeth Webb Long operated the school as Long's Seminary from 1891 to 1896. The school affiliated with the Presbyterian Synod of North Carolina in 1896, changed its name to the Presbyterian College for Women. and moved to 600-616 North College Street on the corner of 9th Street..

The college moved to fifty-acres in Myers Park in 1912 and changed its name to Queen's College. The trustees selected the Queen's College name to commemorate a school established in North Carolina in 1771, before being disallowed by the British Crown the next year. They hoped this would inspire more interest in the college.

In 1930, it merged with Chicora College for Women, previously located in Columbia, South Carolina. As part of the merger, Chicora sold all of its assets and turned over the proceeds to Queens College; the latter agreed to archive Chicora's records relating to students and alumni. The merged institution was called Queens-Chicora College from 1930 to 1939.

Daniel G. Lugo assumed the role of Queens' 21st president on July 1, 2019, after the retirement of Dr. Pamela Davies, who led Queens for 17 years.

In 2020, the board of trustees voted unanimously to rename Burwell Hall, which had been named in 1914 after Margaret Anna Burwell, the wife of Robert Burwell, to Queens Hall. Burwell was the first head of Queens and the building was renamed because the couple were slaveowners.

== Merger ==
In September 2025, Queens and Elon University announced their merger. Their accrediting agency, the Southern Association of Colleges and Schools Commission on Colleges (SACSCOC), approved the merger in June 2026, leaving Elon University in full control of Queens as its "sole member." From July 1, Elon began integrating certain administrative departments, with the full merger of both institutions expected to be completed in 2027–28.

In September 2026 the schools announced Queens would be called Elon University Queens College.

== Academics ==
=== Undergraduate admissions ===
In 2024, Queens University of Charlotte accepted 67.7% of undergraduate applicants, with admission standards considered challenging, and with those enrolled predicted to have an average 3.41 high school GPA based on a large sample of college GPA data as the school has not published high school GPA data for its incoming freshman. The university does not require submission of standardized test scores, but they will be considered when submitted. Those enrolled who submitted test scores had an average 1210 SAT score (17% submitting scores) or an average 26 ACT score (15% submitting scores).

=== Rankings ===
Academic rankings

Master's
- Washington Monthly: 465 of 604

Regional
- U.S. News & World Report: 17 (tie) of 135

In 2025, U.S. News & World Report ranked Queens University of Charlotte tied at No. 17 out of 135 Regional Universities South, tied at No. 8 in Best Undergraduate Teaching, No. 33 in Best Value Schools, No. 35 in Best Colleges for Veterans, No. 392 out of 686 universities in Best Bachelor of Science in nursing (BSN) Programs, and tied at No. 111 out of 133 in Top Performers on Social Mobility.

== Athletics ==
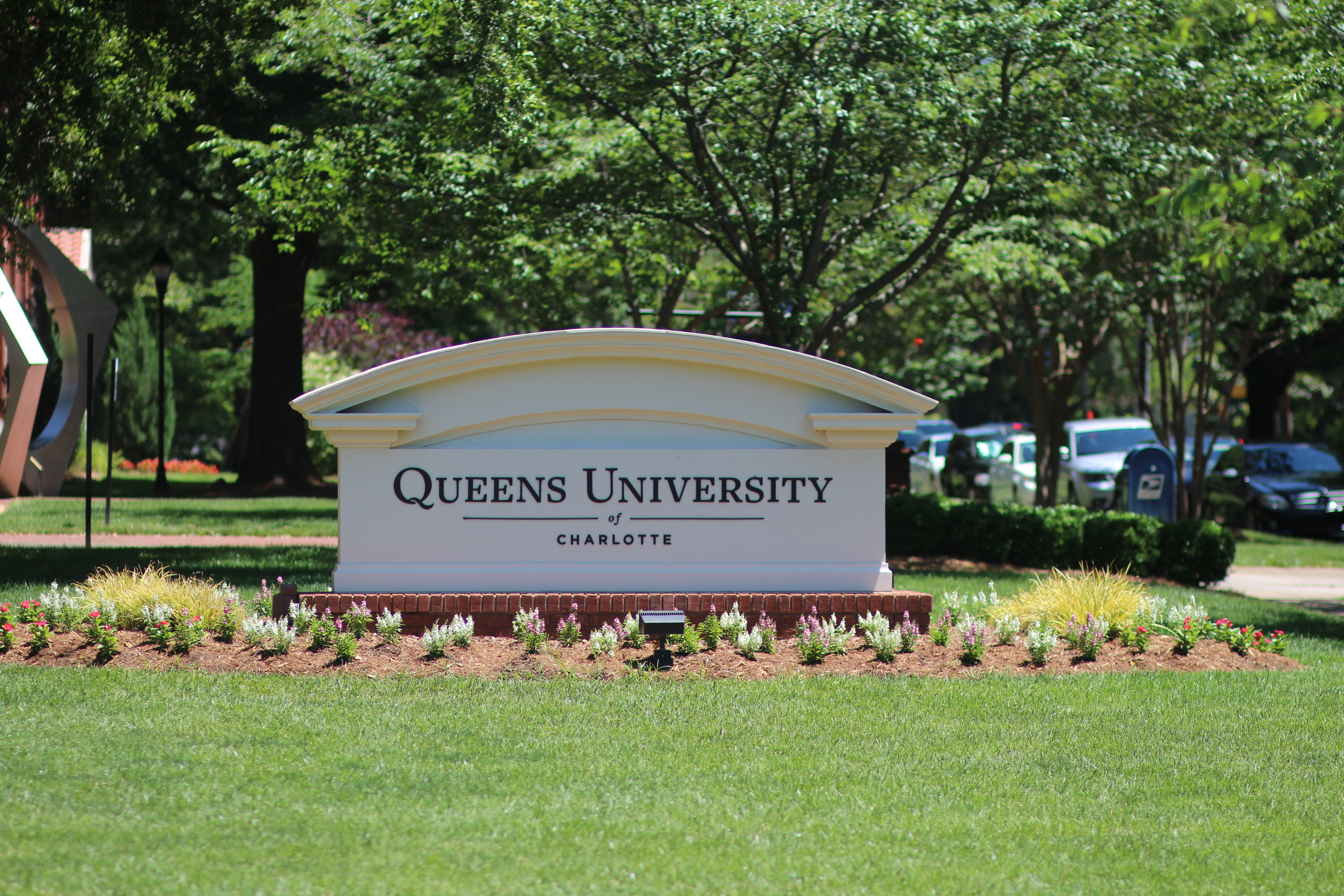
The main entrance to Queens University of Charlotte

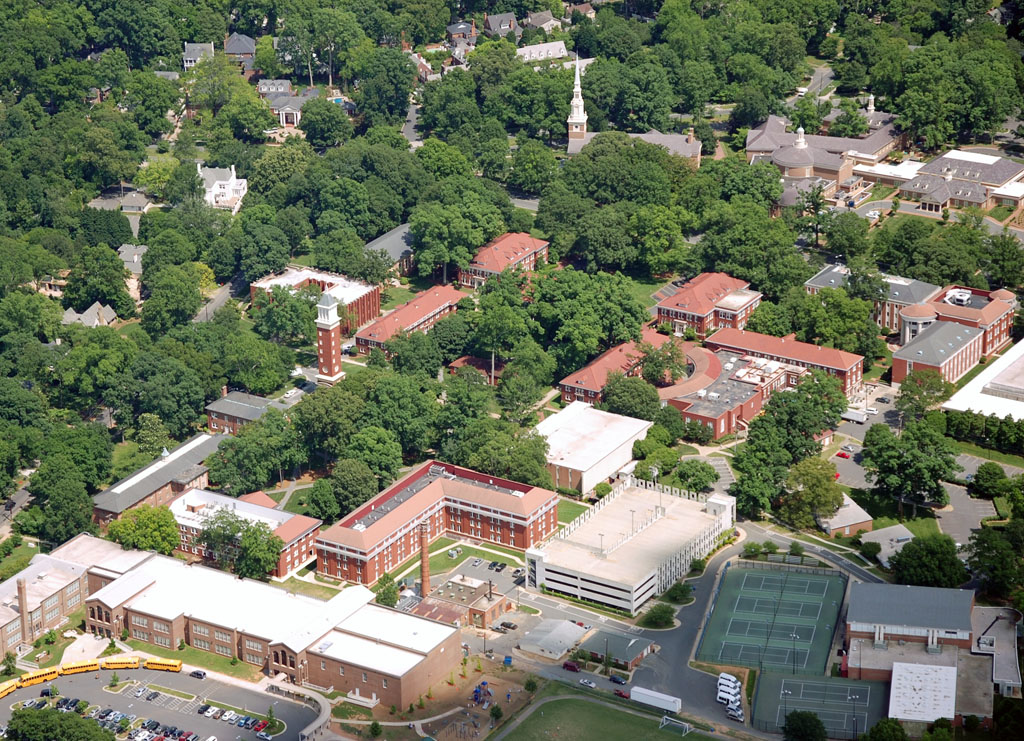
Aerial view of campus in 2007

Queens University of Charlotte's athletic teams are called the Queens Royals; their mascot is named Rex. Queens is a member of the NCAA's Division I program nationally; regionally, the Royals participate in the ASUN Conference.

=== Men's sports ===
Men's athletic teams include baseball, basketball, cheerleading, cross-country, golf, lacrosse, rugby, soccer, swimming, tennis, track & field, volleyball, and triathlon.

=== Women's sports ===
Women's athletic teams include basketball, cheerleading, dance, cross-country, equestrian, field hockey, golf, lacrosse, rugby, soccer, softball, swimming, tennis, track & field, volleyball, and triathlon.

== Notable people ==
- Betsy Byars (1928–2020), Newbery Medal-winning author of children's books (e.g., Summer of the Swans)
- Elizabeth Johnston Evans Johnston (1851–1934), philanthropist and social worker
- Becky Douglas, philanthropist and founder of Rising Star Outreach
- Jayson Alexander, NASCAR Craftsman Truck Series and ARCA Menards Series driver
