= Profiles in Caring =

American television series

- Created by: Kimberly Perkins Klintworth
- Presented by: Kimberly Perkins Klintworth

Production
- Production company: DreamWeaver Medical Foundation

Original release
- Network: Syndication
- Release: 2004 – 2009

Profiles in Caring is a television program about humanitarian charities around the world. Each episode profiles a different charity, hosted by a reporter, using video footage and interviews to tell their story. Each program is 30 minutes, and reflects extraordinary humanitarian projects from all around the world with a personal, behind-the-scenes emphasis. Profiles in Caring is a non-religious, non-profit enterprise, an initiative of DreamWeaver Medical Foundation, a 501(c)(3) organization.

The programs are aired in America on over 100 stations, and internationally in over 40 countries. Profiles can be found on ABC4 Utah (KTVX-TV), AmericanLife TV Network, America One Television Network, Altitude Sports and Entertainment, KLHU-CD, LiVN TV, Starfish Television Network, and Voice of America. Online, every Profiles episode can be found on the nonprofit, video-sharing website, GoodTube.org.

Profiles in Caring was started and is primarily reported by Kimberly Perkins Klintworth. She has a 26-year career in television broadcasting, including co-hosting PM Magazine in Rochester, New York, reporting and anchoring at KDKA-TV in Pittsburgh, Pennsylvania, and anchoring the 5:30, 6:00, and 10:00 weekday news at ABC affiliate KTVX-TV in Salt Lake City, Utah. Kimberly won 2 Emmy Awards during her tenure at KTVX and has been honored by numerous organizations for her work, including the 2007 Community Builders Award of Salt Lake City, as well as serving on the board of the YWCA for 7 years. Kimberly now travels the world, reporting stories on nonprofits for Profiles.

The Profiles in Caring team also includes Lynn Peterson, Executive Producer, Photojournalist, and Editor. Lynn originally pursued a life in acting, and worked as an assistant producer for Dolly Parton’s Sand Dollar Productions. After that he worked as a photojournalist at ABC, where he met Kimberly. Doug Jardine, Videographer, Editor, and Reporter for Profiles, is a photographer and an Emmy Award-winning television news reporter and anchor.
