= General German Workers' Association =

1863–1875 left-wing political party in Germany

General German Workers' Association Allgemeiner Deutscher Arbeiter-Verein
- Founder: Ferdinand Lassalle
- Founded: 23 May 1863; 163 years ago
- Dissolved: May 1875; 151 years ago
- Merged into: Social Democratic Party of Germany
- Headquarters: Berlin; Leipzig (since 1868)
- Newspaper: Der Sozial-Demokrat; Der Agitator; Neuer Social-Demokrat
- Membership: 15,000
- Ideology: Social democracy State socialism (Note: The ADAV represented the state-socialist wing of the labor movement. While positioned on the left, it was less hostile to the Prussian state than the rival SDAP. Furthermore, due to its willingness to cooperate with the monarchy for social reform, the ADAV was often viewed as less radical than the DtVP, whose radical-liberal and anti-Prussian republicanism posed a more direct challenge to the imperial order.); Lassallism
- Political position: Left-wing
- Colors: Red

The General German Workers' Association (German: Allgemeiner Deutscher Arbeiter-Verein, ADAV) was a German political party founded on 23 May 1863 in Leipzig, Kingdom of Saxony by Ferdinand Lassalle. It was the first organized mass working-class party in history.

The organization existed by this name until 1875, when it combined with the Social Democratic Workers' Party of Germany (SDAP) to form the Socialist Workers' Party of Germany. This unified organization was renamed soon thereafter the Social Democratic Party of Germany (SPD), which presently remains in existence and dates its origins to the founding of the ADAV. Its Austrian part would become the SPÖ.

The ADAV was the first German Labour Party, formed in Prussia before the establishment of the German Empire. It was active in the German Confederation, which included the Austrian Empire.

== Organizational history ==
=== Establishment ===
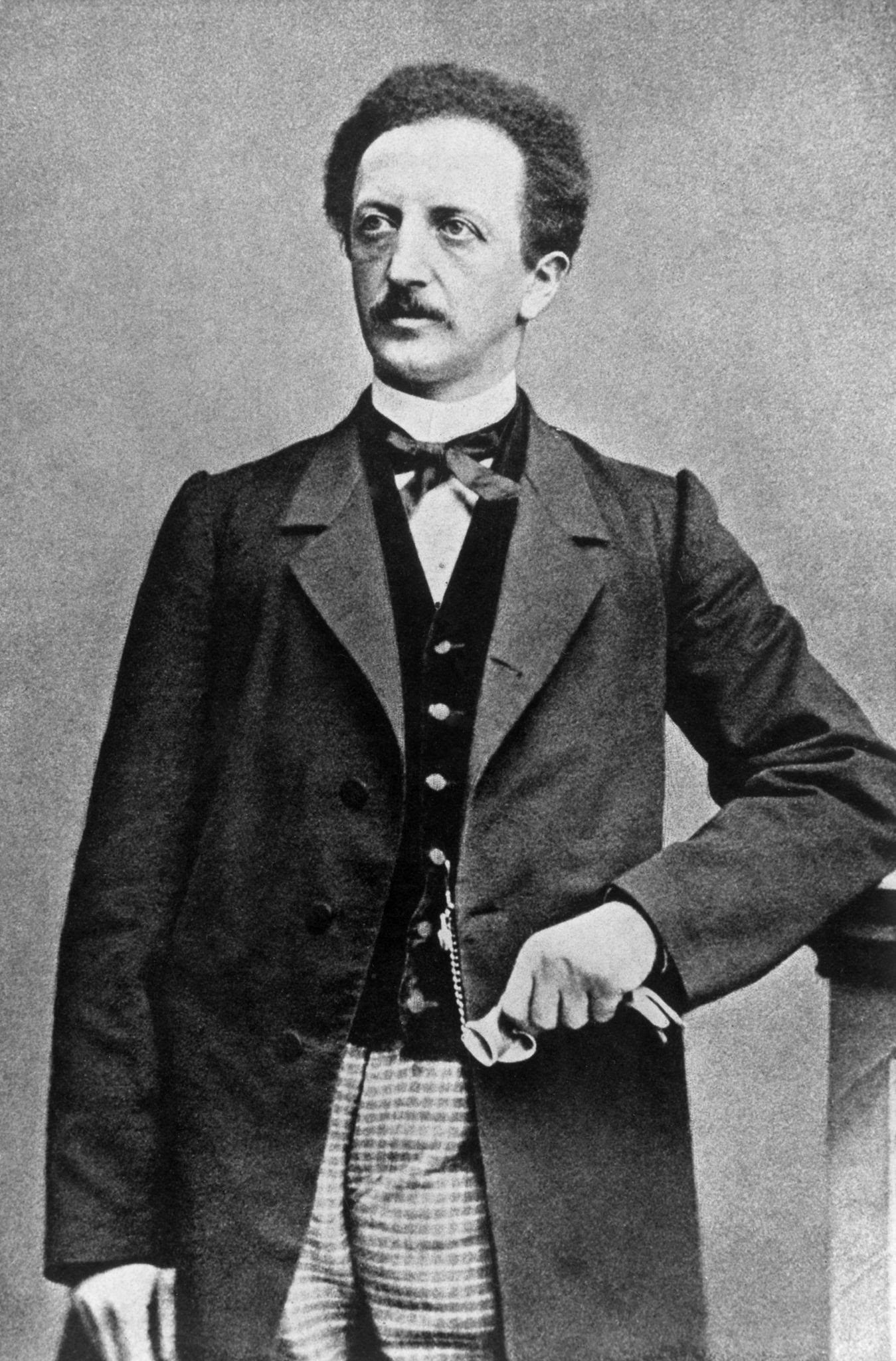
Ferdinand Lassalle, founder of the ADAV

The ADAV was founded in Leipzig by Ferdinand Lassalle and twelve delegates from some of the most important cities in Germany, namely Barmen, Dresden, Düsseldorf, Elberfeld, Frankfurt am Main, Hamburg, Harburg, Cologne, Leipzig, Mainz and Solingen.

The ADAV sought to advance the interests of the working class and to work for the establishment of socialism by the use of electoral politics. Lassalle acted as president from 23 May 1863 until his death in a duel on 31 August 1864.

The unofficial organ of the ADAV was the newspaper Der Sozial-Demokrat (The Social Democrat), launching publication in Berlin on 15 December 1864. The publication initially won promises of editorial contributions from the radical exiles Karl Marx and Friedrich Engels, but the pair soon disfavored the notion owing to the allegiance of the Sozial-Demokrat and the ADAV to the memory and ideas of their nemesis Lassalle.

=== Development ===
The ADAV had its first congress, called a General Assembly, in Düsseldorf on 27 December 1864. Marx and his associates had hoped that this gathering would cause the organization to join the newly established International Workingmen's Association (First International), which they helped manage, but the gathering did not discuss affiliation, further disaffecting Marx from the group.

Wilhelm Liebknecht was a member until 1865, but as the ADAV tried to cooperate with Otto von Bismarck's government, for example on the question of women's suffrage, Liebknecht became disillusioned with the association. He had been writing for Der Sozial-Demokrat, but as a result of disagreement with the newspaper's Prussia-friendly rhetoric he quit the organization to establish the Saxon People's Party along with August Bebel. In 1869, Liebknecht became a co-founder of the SDAP in Eisenach as a branch of the International Workingmen's Association.

Liebknecht was to meet again with his old ADAV colleagues as the lack of support for the ADAV caused them to join forces with Liebknecht's SDAP in 1875.

=== Merger and legacy ===
Together with the SDAP, the ADAV formed the Socialist Workers' Party of Germany at the Socialist Unity Conference in Gotha. The manifesto of the new organization was the Gotha Program, which urged "universal, equal, direct suffrage".

In 1890, the party was renamed the Social Democratic Party of Germany and it still exists under this name. The SPD now dates its origins to the founding of the ADAV and celebrated its 150th anniversary in the spring of 2013.

== Lasallean General German Workers' Association ==
The Lasallean General German Workers' Association (LADAV) was a short-lived splinter party founded by Sophie von Hatzfeldt and Friedrich Wilhelm Emil Försterling in June 1867. Despite success when Försterling gained the Reichstag seat for the Chemnitz Reichstag constituency in the August 1867 election, the party passed out of existence after Försterling resigned his seat in April 1870 and died in 1872.

== Presidents ==
- Ferdinand Lassalle (23 May 1863 – 31 August 1864)
- Otto Dammer (1 September – 2 November 1864)
- Bernhard Becker (2 November 1864 – 21 November 1869)
- Friedrich Wilhelm Fritzsche (21–30 November 1865)
- Hugo Hillmann (30 November – 31 December 1865)
- Carl Wilhelm Tölcke (1 January – 18 June 1866)
- August Perl (18 June 1866 – 19 May 1867)
- Johann Baptist von Schweitzer (20 May 1867 – 30 June 1871)
- Fritz Mende (24 June – 4 July 1869)
- Wilhelm Hasenclever (1 July 1871 – 25 May 1875)
