= Johann Andreas Klindworth =

German clockmaker (1742–1813)

Johann Andreas Klindworth (11 November 1742 in Göttingen – 1813) was an eighteenth-century mechanic and maker of astronomical instruments. He was also the ancestor of a well known and much respected family whose reputation comes up to our present day. He is credited as being the inventor of the month-going regulator of the Seeberg Observatory in Gotha, Germany, made about 1786.

== Biography ==
Despite the poor living conditions of his parents, the young Johann Andreas was able to achieve an extraordinary level of education. Being a talented and clever man, he joined the watchmaking industry as an apprentice to his father after he left school.

In 1785, he married Friederica Eleonora Diedrich and had three sons, Karl Friedrich Felix Klindworth, who continued his work as a clockmaker, Carl August Klindworth, builder of mathematical, physical and optical instruments, Georg Klindworth, one of the most influential secret diplomats of his time, and daughter Johanna Dorothea Caroline Klindworth.

He attended Georg Christoph Lichtenberg's lectures on physics and on his persuasion, moved on from the watchmaking mechanics to the large electrophorus, which was evidently Klindworth's work by judging from Lichtenberg's letters. (Note: In contemporary literature they are always mentioned - Lichtenberg, the inventor, Klindworth, the builder. They almost merge into each other. Klindworth, titular mechanic of the Duke of Gotha, who had been working for Lichtenberg since 1776.) He then became his assistant at his experimental lectures until 1791 when he was substituted by Johann Hermann Seyde. He received many orders from abroad, including, among other things, the title of court mechanic from the Duke Ernest II, Duke of Saxe-Gotha-Altenburg.

== See also ==
- German inventors and discoverers
