= Max Schippel =

Max Valentin Schippel (6 December 1859, Chemnitz – 6 June 1928 Dresden) was a German Social Democrat journalist and writer.

Schippel was the son of a school teacher. In the early 1880s he went to Berlin to study political economy under Adolph Wagner and fell under the influence of "State Socialism" ("Staatssozialismus") also being influenced by Albert Schäffle and Eugen Dühring. However he was later to embrace Marxism and joined the Social Democratic Party of Germany (SPD), even though he always maintained a level of independence, sometimes trying to reconcile his prior views with the dominant themes of Marxism.

He was employed by the SPD first as editor of the Volksblatt (1886–7) and then the Volkstribune (1887–90).

In 1890 his proficiency as a public speaker attracted the attention of local leaders of the SPD and he successfully stood for the Reichstag in the election that year. Although critical of August Bebel he did not join Die Jungen, who felt he had lost his radical perspective.
