= SuperCircuits =

American manufacturer

Supercircuits, Inc.
- Type: Private
- Industry: Security, Electronics
- Founded: 1 January 1989
- Founder: Steve Klindworth
- Headquarters: Austin, Texas; United States,
- Area served: Worldwide
- Key people: Brian Wood, Victoria Richardson, Roger Norman, George Farley
- Products: Traditional CCTV video, IP video, wireless, micro, covert, law enforcement, mobile, integrated, and customized solutions
- Parent: The Carlyle Group
- Website: www.supercircuits.com

Supercircuits, Inc. is an American manufacturer of audio and video surveillance devices based in Austin, Texas.

Supercircuits has been on the Inc. 500 list of America's fastest growing companies and was listed three times in the Guinness Book of World Records. They serve on average over 400,000 customers, including small businesses, large corporations, dealer and integrator partners, government, law enforcement, and the military.

== History ==
Founded in 1989, by Steve Klindworth, Supercircuits started out in Liberty Hill, TX. In 1993, they introduced the first money back guarantee in the video surveillance industry. 1997's Inc magazine named the company to the Inc 500 fastest growing private companies. In 1999–2009, The Guinness Book of World Records listed Supercircuits as the direct seller of the World's Smallest Video Camera.

== Products ==
Supercircuits focuses on the audio and video surveillance industry. As a result, they supply the law enforcement, military and other intelligence gathering organizations in areas concerning surveillance. Their products are featured in catalog form and in their website.

== Acquisition ==
In August 2006, Supercircuits was acquired by the Carlyle-led investment group, SAC, Inc. (now Observint Technologies). Observint Technologies is a privately held company focused on providing operations, finance, marketing, and related support services for businesses in the surveillance sector.
