= Sophie von Hatzfeldt =

Prussian activist (1805–1881)

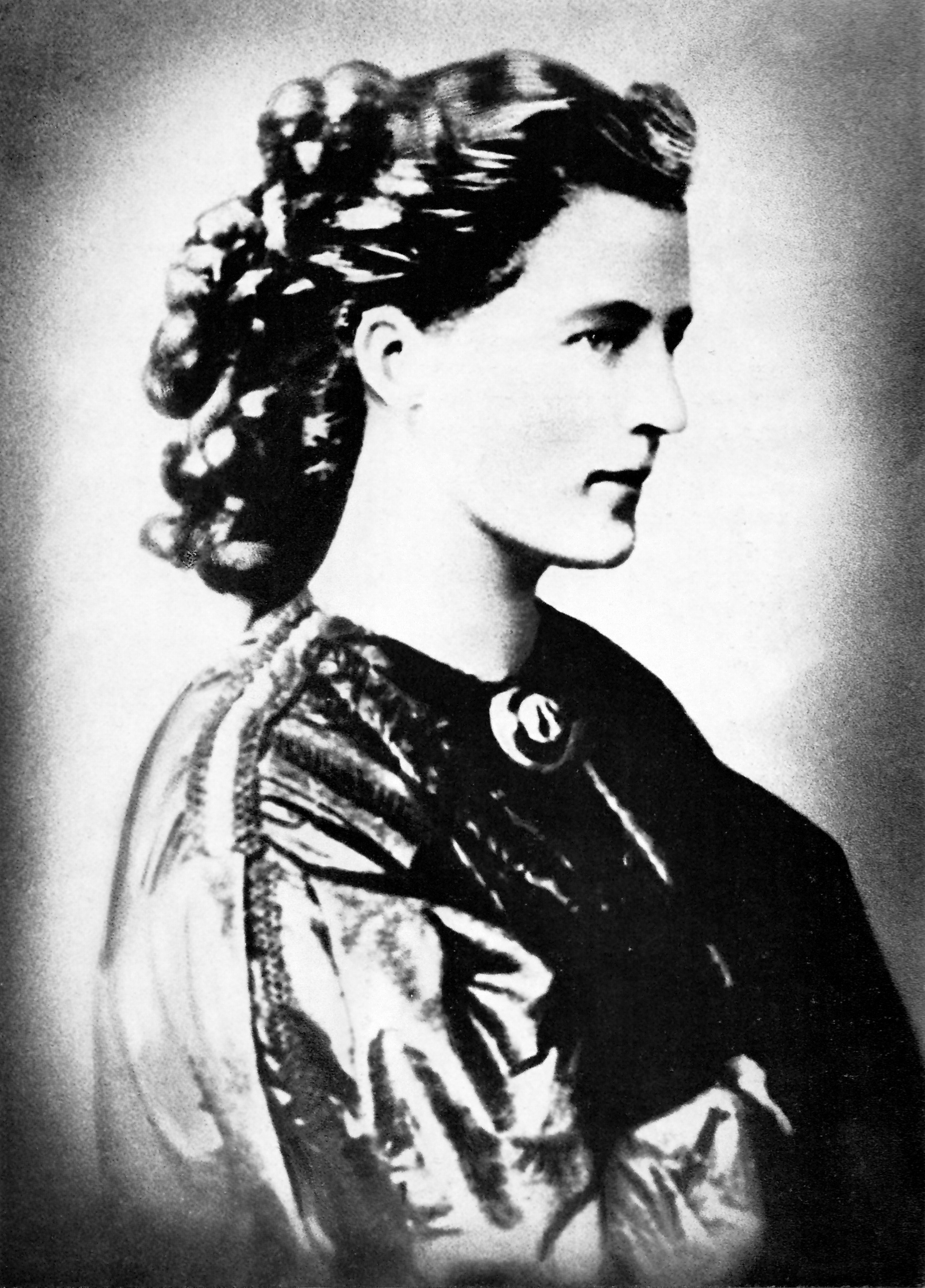
Sophie Gräfin von Hatzfeldt

Sophie Gräfin von Hatzfeldt, born Gräfin von Hatzfeldt-Schönstein zu Trachenberg (10 August 1805 in Trachenberg (Lower Silesia) – 25 January 1881 in Wiesbaden) was active in the German working-class movement and partner and confidante of Ferdinand Lassalle.

== Early life ==
She was the daughter of Prussian general Franz Ludwig von Hatzfeldt zu Trachenberg (1756−1827) and Countess Friederike Karoline von der Schulenburg (1779–1832), a daughter of the Prussian minister to the General Directorate Friedrich Wilhelm von Schulenburg-Kehnert. His older sister, Countess Luise von Hatzfeldt was the wife of Prussian General Ludwig Freiherr Roth von Schreckenstein, the Minister of War. Among her other siblings were brothers Prince Hermann Anton von Hatzfeldt and Maximilian von Hatzfeldt. From Prince Hermann's second marriage to Marie von Nimptsch, she was aunt to Prince (later Duke) Hermann von Hatzfeldt, who represented the Deutsche Reichspartei in the Reichstag. She grew up in the Hatzfeld Palace of Trachenberg and in Berlin.

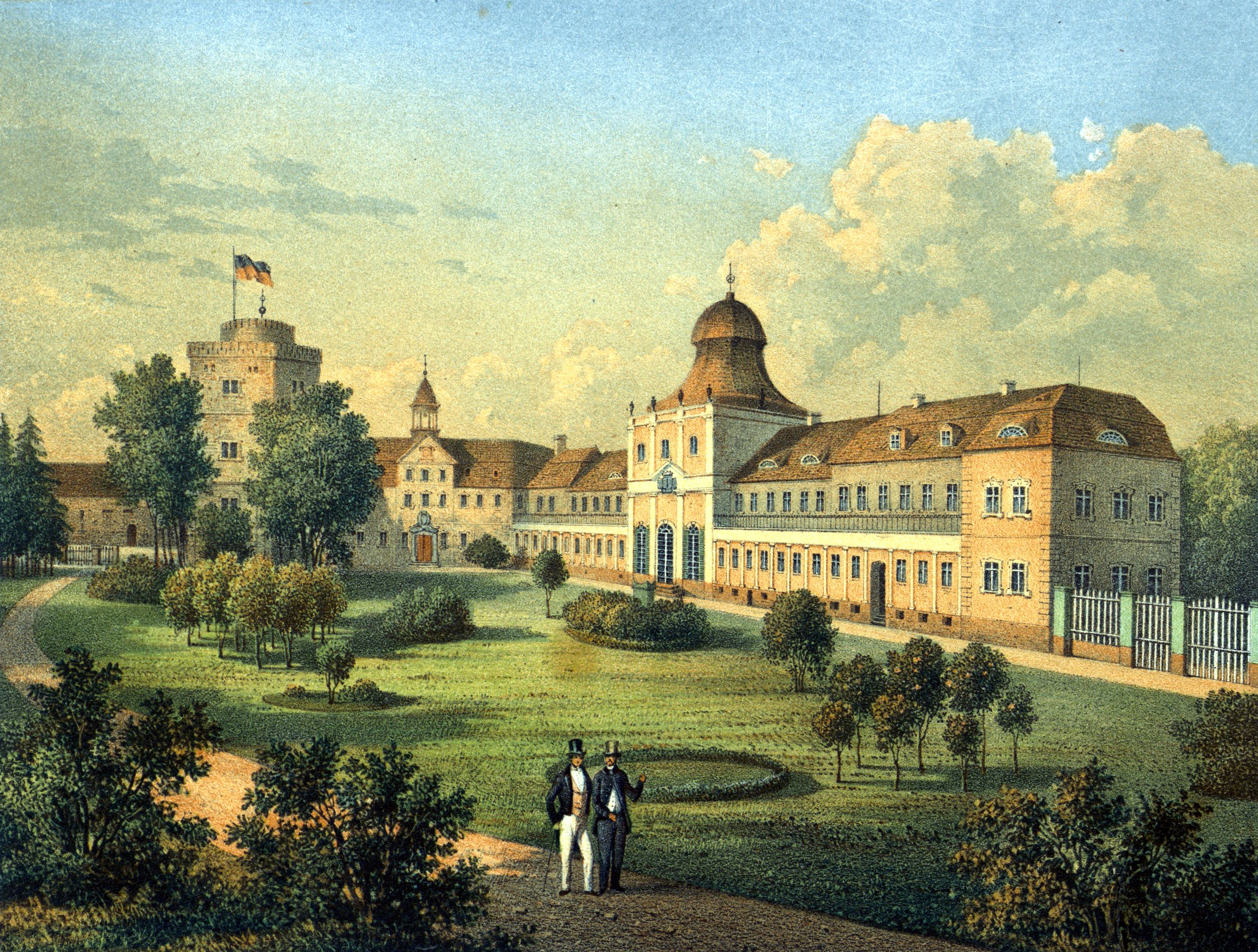
The Hatzfeld Palace c. 1860, edition by Alexander Duncker

== Life ==
In 1822, Sophie was forced to marry her distant cousin, Count Edmund von Hatzfeldt-Wildenburg (28 December 1798 in Kinzweiler – 14 January 1874 in Düsseldorf) with whom she had three children (including Paul von Hatzfeldt, who was Ambassador to London and Constantinople, Foreign Secretary, and Head of the Foreign Office). The marriage was unhappy, as her husband was controlling her money and her movements. They separated in 1833.

In 1846, when she was in her early forties, she made the acquaintance of Ferdinand Lassalle (1825–1864). In a long and relentless lawsuit to gain a divorce from the unhappy marriage and her fight for her rights as an independent woman, she was represented by Lassalle, who saw the process as a fight against injustice in general. Sophie became an independent and politically active woman; her house in Düsseldorf became an important meeting point of activists, including Karl Marx, during the March revolution in 1848.

After Lassalle's death in 1864, seeing herself as the one responsible for continuing his work, she saw to the publishing of his hitherto unpublished writings and was active in the Allgemeiner Deutscher Arbeiterverein (ADAV) that had been founded by Lasalle - even if, according to Prussian law, she was not allowed to become an official member. In 1867, she founded an ADAV splinter group, the Lassallescher Allgemeiner Deutscher Arbeiterverein (LADAV). After a lack of political success, she retired from politics and died in 1881.

Even if she did not succeed in implementing Lassalle's views as the ones that would further guide the working-class movement, she was highly appreciated by many workers and left her mark on the movement.

== Family ==
Sophie and Edmund von Hatzfeldt-Wildenburg married on 10 August 1822 and divorced in 1851. They had two sons and one daughter:

- Alfred (9 April 1825 – 3 June 1911), who married in 1852 to Gabriele von Dietrichstein-Proskau-Leslie (1825–1909), had issue.
- Melanie (29 October 1828 – 28 February 1911), who married in 1852 to Maximilian von Nesselrode-Ehreshoven (1817–1898), had issue.
- Paul (8 October 1831 – 22 November 1901), who married in 1863 to Helene Moulton (1846–1918), had issue.

== Ancestry ==
8. Baron Wilhelm Franz von Hatzfeld
4. Count Karl Ferdinand von Hatzfeldt-Wildenburg
9. Baroness Sophie Therese von Loë
2. Prince Franz Ludwig von Hatzfeldt-Trachenberg
10. Baron Karl Ferdinand von Venningen
5. Baroness Maria Anna Elisabeth von Venningen
11. Countess Elisabeth Claudia Reich von Reichenstein
1. Countess Sophie von Hatzfeldt-Trachenberg
12. Baron Friedrich Wilhelm von der Schulenburg
6. Count Friedrich Wilhelm von der Schulenburg-Kehnert
13. Juliane Luise Sophie von Sydow
3. Countess Friederike Karoline von der Schulenburg-Kehnert
14. Christoph Dietrich von Arnstedt
7. Helene Sophie Wilhelmine von Arnstedt
15. Sidonia Helena Magdalena von Stedern

== See also ==
- House of Hatzfeld
