= Carl August Klindworth =

German mechanic and businessman (1791–1862)

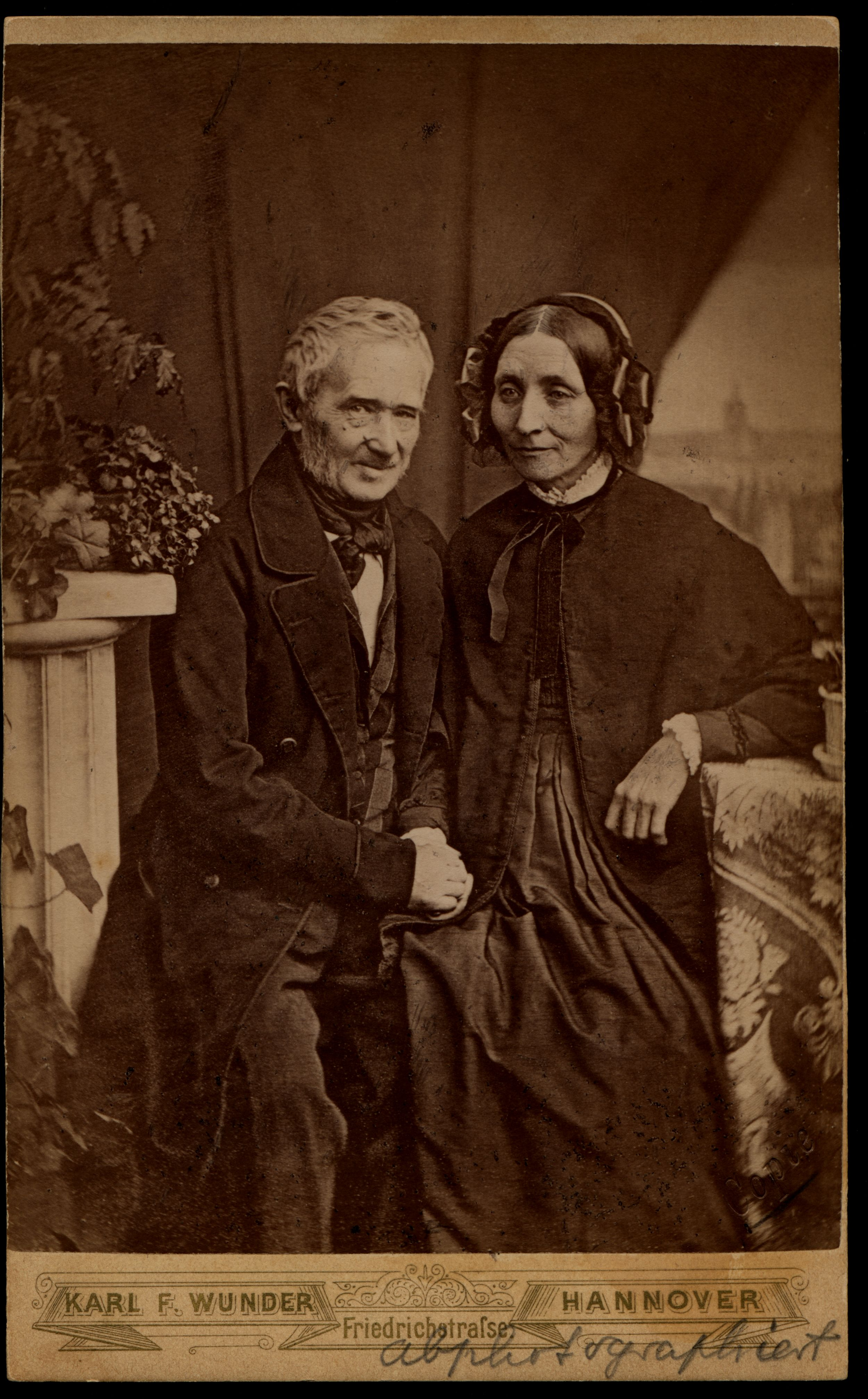
Carl August Klindworth

Ludwig Carl August Klindworth (1791-1862) was a nineteenth-century German mechanic and entrepreneur. He was an instructor of the later manufacturer, civil director and senator Conrad Bube. He was honoured in 1837 by the trade association of the Kingdom of Hanover with the Golden Needle Award "for his machines for weaving and spinning mills", including the mechanical weaving machine.

== Family ==
Klindworth was born on 5 June 1791 in Göttingen as the second son of the Göttinger mechanic and clockmaker Johann Andreas Klindworth (1742–1813) and Friederica Eleonora Klindworth, née Diedrich. His elder brother was Karl Friedrich Felix Klindworth (c. 1788-1851), who took over his father's business at the same time to ensure the oppressive obligation for the upkeeping of his mother and siblings. His younger brother was politician and State Council Georg Klindworth. In 1785, Carl Augustus married Dorothea Wilhelmine (1800–1853), née Lamminger, the daughter of court printer Johann Thomas Lamminger (1757–1805). Their first son was classical composer and pianist Karl Klindworth.

== Life ==
Following the traditions of the craftsmen of the University of Göttingen, Carl August Klindworth built mathematical, physical and optical instruments to his establishment in Hanover. In 1831, he constructed the first one horsepower steam engine within the Kingdom of Hanover for the water supply of the City Hospital in Linden. In 1836, he founded a machine factory which supplied other parts and equipment for fire engines, rolling mills and printing presses. In the mid-1840s, Klindworth's firma was known in the address book of the city of Hanover as a "machine shop and mechanical workshop", and also recommended in 1860 for "spectacles, lorgnettes, theater perspectives, barometers, gold scales, thermometers, etc." Klindworth died in Hannover on 29 June 1862.
