= Starfish Television Network =

- Headquarters: Salt Lake City, Utah

History
- Launched: April 18, 2007

Starfish Television Network was an unlicensed public service broadcaster. It primarily broadcast programming by and about non-profit humanitarian organizations, at no cost for airtime to those organizations.

Co-founded in early 2007 by Melodee McInnis Baird Paul per her LinkedIn profile, Starfish began broadcasting on April 18, 2007. It ceased on March 31, 2010. At its peak, it was available to over 13 million households and featured nearly 600 non-profit organizations.
