= Agnes Street-Klindworth =

Danish musician (1825–1906)

Agnes Street-Klindworth, also Agnes Denis-Street, was the illegitimate daughter of journalist, actor and diplomat Georg Klindworth (1798–1882) and a Danish actress named Brigitta Bartels (1786–1864).

== Biography ==
Agnès worked as a political spy and journalist. She was born on 19 October 1825 in Bremen, Germany. She arrived in Weimar in 1853, as one of Peter Cornelius' pupils for harmony. Shortly after she began having piano lessons with Franz Liszt, whom she befriended and had an affair with. They maintained a vast correspondence between the spring of 1855 and 1861, when he finally took up residence in Rome.

Agnès gave birth to her first son named Ernst August Georg, known as Georges Street, on 21 January 1854. Her second child with her husband Captain Ernst Denis-Street was named Charles, born on 18 July 1855. Her third child was named Fernande (16 December 1856 – 23 August 1857), daughter of the composer and revolutionary activist Ferdinand Lassalle. Henri, her illegitimate fourth child, was probably raised as a foster child by another family or died like his sister.

She moved to Paris with Ernst and her two sons in February 1868. She died in the surroundings of Paris on 25 December 1906 at the age of 81.
