= Georg Klindworth =

German diplomat and intelligence agent (1798–1882)

Georg Klindworth, born Johann Georg Heinrich Klindworth on 16 April 1798 in Göttingen, Holy Roman Empire, was a nineteenth-century German diplomat and intelligence agent employed by several European leaders and princes. He was a political exile from the 1848 upheavals, who had worked as a theater agent for two years, later as a lawyer and also as a statesman. He was for many times described as one of the most influential secret diplomats of his time, from the Congress of Vienna to the time of Bismarck.

Klindworth's "illegitimate" daughter Agnes Street-Klindworth (1825–1906) was a lover of the musician Franz Liszt with whom she had a vast letter correspondence. In political literature, Georg Klindworth is characterized as "an important political secret agent of international reputation" and also as "a man of extraordinary ability, enterprise, amorality and ubiquity". Georg Klindworth died in a suburb of Paris in January 1882.

== Life and work ==
Klindworth was the third child of court mechanic and watchmaker Johann Andreas Klindworth and Friederike Diederichs, brother of Karl Friedrich Felix Klindworth, a clockmaker and Carl August Klindworth, mechanic and entrepreneur. When Georg was sixteen years old he graduated eighth in his class at the University of Göttingen, where from 1816 he studied philology, receiving his doctorate in 1817. From 1819 Klindworth worked in Berlin as tutor and private secretary to the Portuguese Ambassador Count Oriolo. From 10 December 1821 he was admitted to the Prussian service.

On 22 April the following year he tried to persuade the publisher Friedrich Arnold Brockhaus, as an agent provocateur, for the anonymous publication of a radical liberal-democratic article, but the plan failed and Klindworth had to leave Berlin after his dismissal on 4 May. Three years later, in 1825, he was tutor to the children of Countess Goertz-Wrisberg in Hildesheim, where he was reported to being a school teacher. In 1827 he went to Brunswick, where he entered the service of Duke Charles II of Brunswick. He was at first private secretary in the Ducal Government, and from September 1828 Counsellor of Foreign Affairs. In this function he supported the duke in a discussion with the Kingdom of Hannover until in 1829, when he was demoted by the duke.

In September 1830, Charles II was overthrown and fled to England. Klindworth, who served as Council of State for the duke sought through diplomatic channels his return to Brunswick, but increasing discussions entailed him to finally leave the ducal services in March 1832, after he had already left service for a short time in 1829 because of too low remuneration from the duke. Klindworth then went to Paris and joined in 1832 for several years the service of French King Louis Philippe I, in whose secret cabinet, he played an important role. In the 1840s, he was entrusted with diplomatic missions and agent jobs from the Austrian statesman Metternich, the British Foreign Minister Lord Palmerston, and other European princes and politicians. Sometimes he was also a double agent at the same time for several clients.

From 1848 he was employed by King William I of Württemberg until his dismissal for disloyalty in 1852. Klindworth went from Stuttgart to Weimar, and in the following years he was assigned to various secret missions by the Russian Emperor Nicholas I and his successor Tsar Alexander II.

== See also ==
- Klindworth (surname)
- Revolutions of 1848

== Literature ==
- Alfred Stern:Georg Klindworth. A secret political agent of the 19 Century. In: Historical Quarterly. publisher JCB Mohr, Tübingen 1931, p. 430-458.
- Pauline Pocknell:Franz Liszt and Agnes Street-Klindworth. A Correspondence, 1854-1886. Franz Liszt Studies Series No.8. Pendragon Press, 2001 ISBN 978-1-57647-006-0 Hillsdale (pp. xxix ff)
- Dieter Lent:Klindworth, Johann Georg Heinrich. In: Horst-Rüdiger Jarck, Günter Scheel (ed.): Braunschweigisches biographisches Lexikon / 19. und 20. Jahrhundert. (Biographical Dictionary of Brunswick: 19th and 20th Centuries). Hahnsche publishing bookshop, Hannover 1996, ISBN 3-7752-5838-8, p. 322.
