= Clara von Hatzfeldt =

American heiress

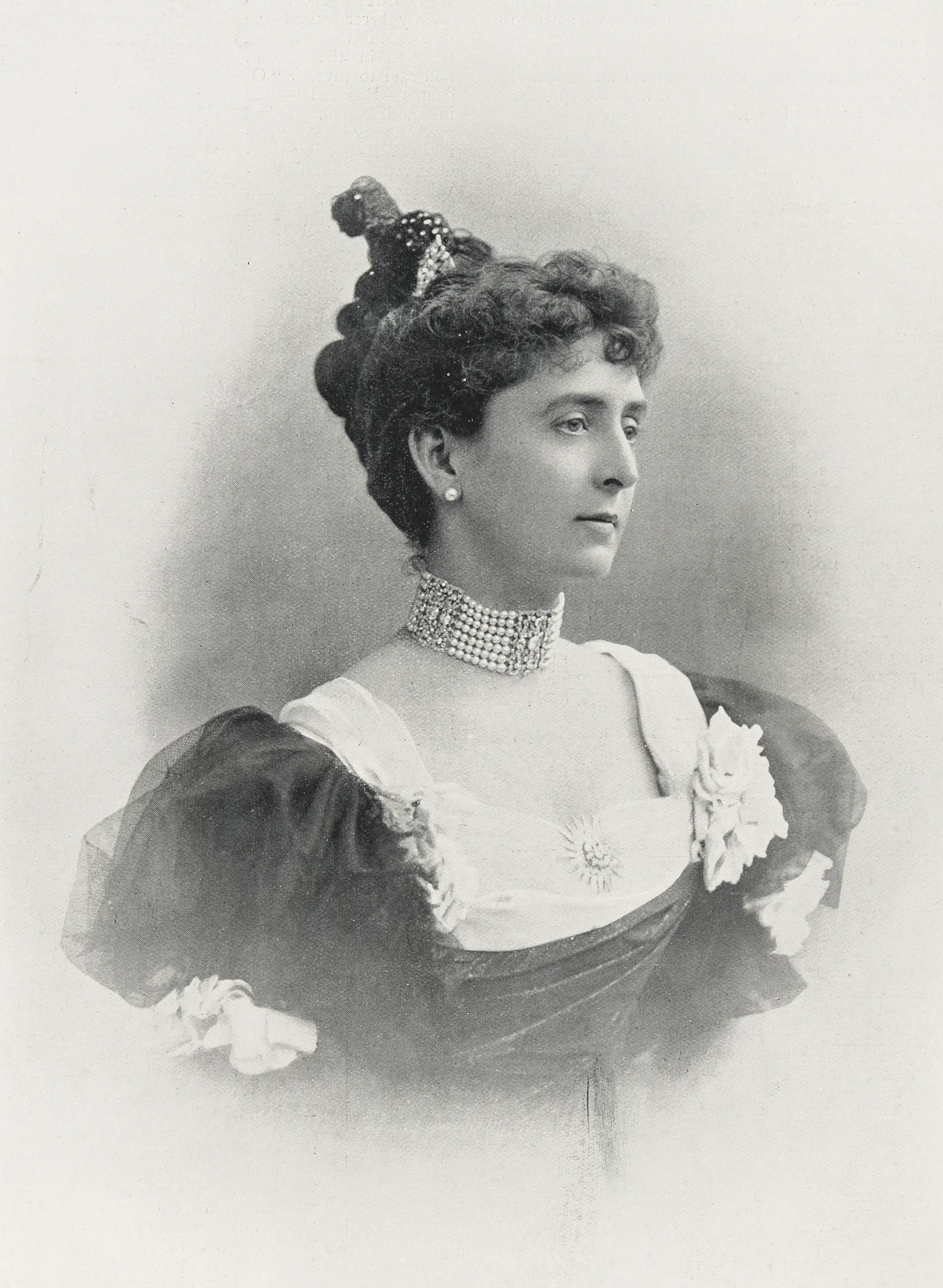
Clara von Hatzfeldt in 1897

Princess Clara von Hatzfeldt-Wildenburg (née Clara Elizabeth Prentice, then Prentice-Huntington) (13 March 1860 – 18 December 1928) was an American heiress and member of the Huntington family who married into the princely House of Hatzfeld.

== Early life ==
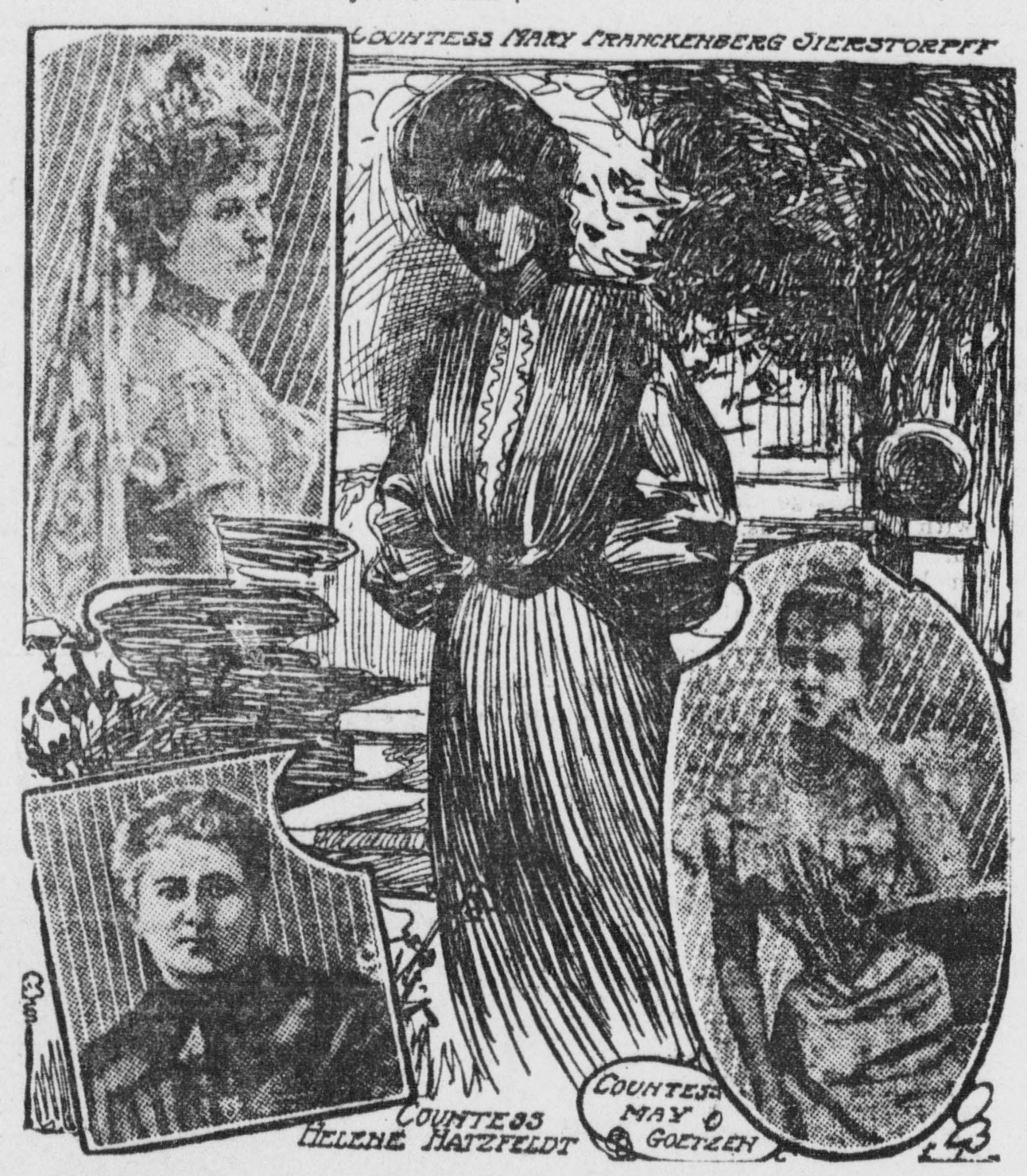
Four American women with entries in the Almanach de Gotha, 1904.

Clara Elizabeth Prentice was born in Sacramento, California on 13 March 1860. She was the biological daughter of Edwin D. Prentice (1821–1862), a Sacramento grocer, and Clara (née Stoddard) Prentice (1824–1912). After her father's death, Clara was adopted by her aunt, Elizabeth Stillman (née Stoddard) Huntington (1823–1883), and her husband, industrialist and railway magnate Collis P. Huntington. Clara's older sister, Mary Alice Prentice, was the wife of Collis' nephew Henry E. Huntington, with whom she had four children.

After Elizabeth died in 1883, Collis married Arabella Yarrington in 1884. Arabella had a son named Archer that Collis also adopted. Collis died in 1900, and Clara received a "fortune of more than $2,000,000", a sum which was later increased to $6,000,000 by agreement with Collis' widow. In 1906, Clara's sister, Mary, and Henry divorced; in 1913, Henry married his uncle Collis' widow, Arabella, in what was a shock to society at the time.

== Personal life ==
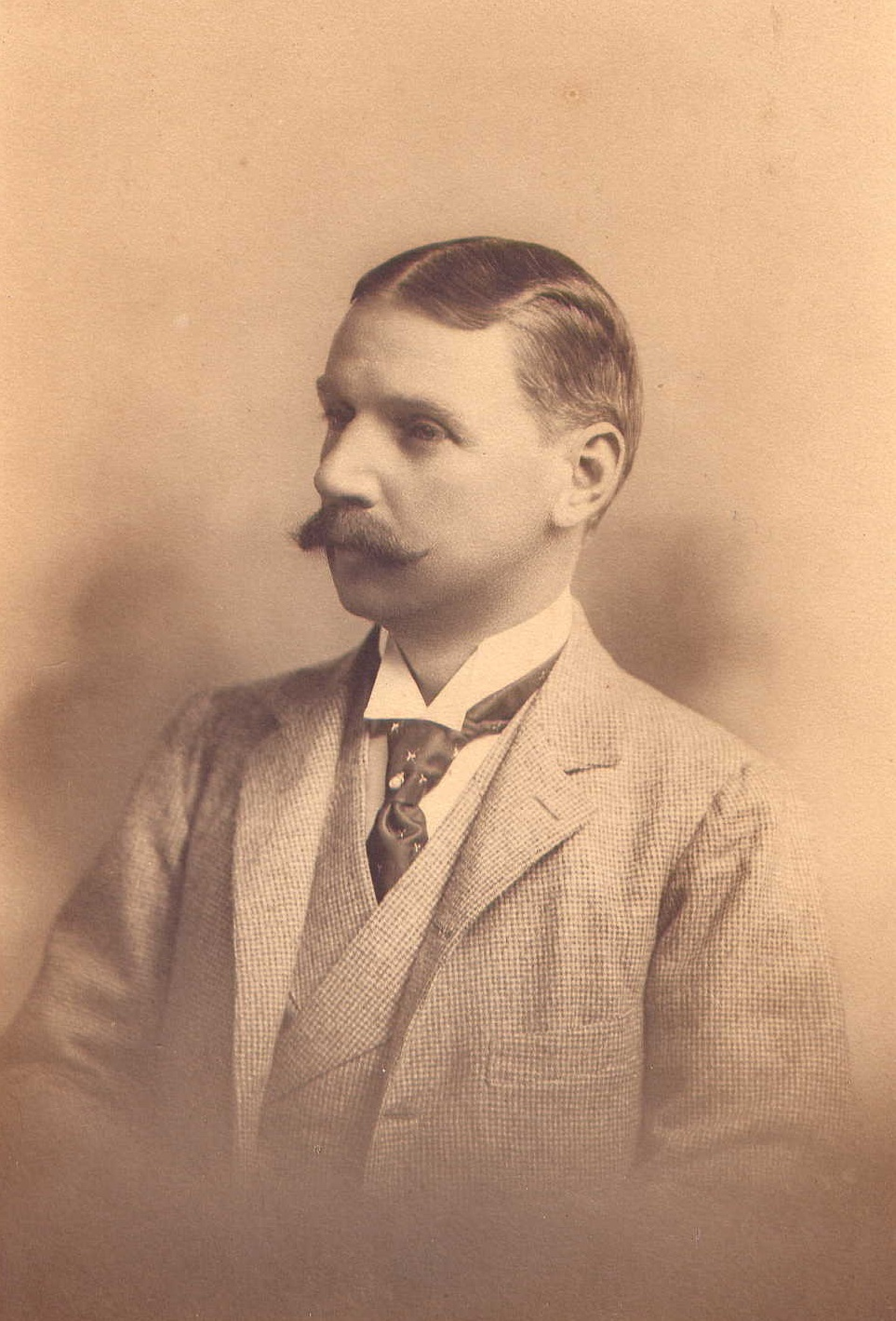
Photograph of her husband, Prince Franz von Hatzfeldt-Wildenburg, taken to celebrate winning the 1906 Grand National.

While traveling through Spain with Mrs. John Sherwood, Clara met Prince Franz Edmund Joseph Gabriel Vitus von Hatzfeldt-Wildenburg (1853–1910), who "became infatuated with her. For some time he has followed her about most devotedly." A noted race-horse owner and "at one time Secretary in one of the embassies in Washington", Prince Franz von Hatzfeldt was born in Bavaria and was a son of Alfred, Prince von Hatzfeldt-Wildenburg (son of Sophie von Hatzfeldt) and Countess Gabriele von Dietrichstein-Proskau-Leslie (a daughter of Joseph Franz, Prince of Dietrichstein). (Note: The Hatzfeldt-Wildenburg-Weisweiler branch inherited Crottorf, Schönstein, Kalkum as well as numerous other properties in 1794 and became Prussian Princes of Hatzfeldt-Wildenburg in 1834.) He was also a nephew of Count Paul von Hatzfeldt, the German Ambassador to the United Kingdom. He was described by The New York Times on 21 August 1889, as follows:

He is tall and fair, with stooping shoulders. No particular fault has ever been found with the Prince, except a chronic impecuniosity and a decided inclination to contract debts that there was no prospect of paying, except he should capture such a prize as he has caught. In short, he has exhibited what has been aptly termed by a favorite American comedian 'a wine taste on a beer income.' His obligations are set by London clubmen, by whom he was always considered a jolly good fellow, at about 4,000,000£ but had not enough money to cut much of a figure. He has been a patron of all the fashionable European watering places, and has been most assiduous in cultivating the acquaintance of rich American girls at Monte Carlo, Baden, Homburg, and other resorts. He has figured conspicuously in several unsavory gambling episodes, one of which, about two years ago, attracted such widespread attention as to cause the Prince to retire for a time. His father and mother are extremely popular both at Berlin and Vienna, but the Prince is regarded as a black sheep and has severed his connection with both the Diplomatic Service and the army.

Despite the press's articles about Prince Franz von Hatzfeldt, on 28 October 1889, Clara was married to him by the Bishop of Emmaus in St Wilfrid's Chapel at Brompton Oratory in London. After their marriage, they lived at Hatzfeldt Castle at Schönstein-on-the-Rhine before leasing Draycot House at Draycot Cerne in Wiltshire, England between 1896 and 1915.

Prince Franz died in London on 4 November 1910, seven months before his father. As they had no children, his princely rights and estates were inherited by his cousin, Count Hermann von Hatzfeldt-Wildenburg (the only son of Count Paul von Hatzfeldt), who was the last Prince of Hatzfeldt-Wildenburg. (Note: After Prince Hermann von Hatzfeldt-Wildenburg's death in 1941, the estates were inherited by Count Hermann von Dönhoff who took on the name of his mother's family: Count von Hatzfeldt-Wildenburg-Dönhoff. Today, his family is one of the largest landowners in Rhineland-Palatinate, also owning the castles of Crottorf and Schönstein.)

== Society life ==
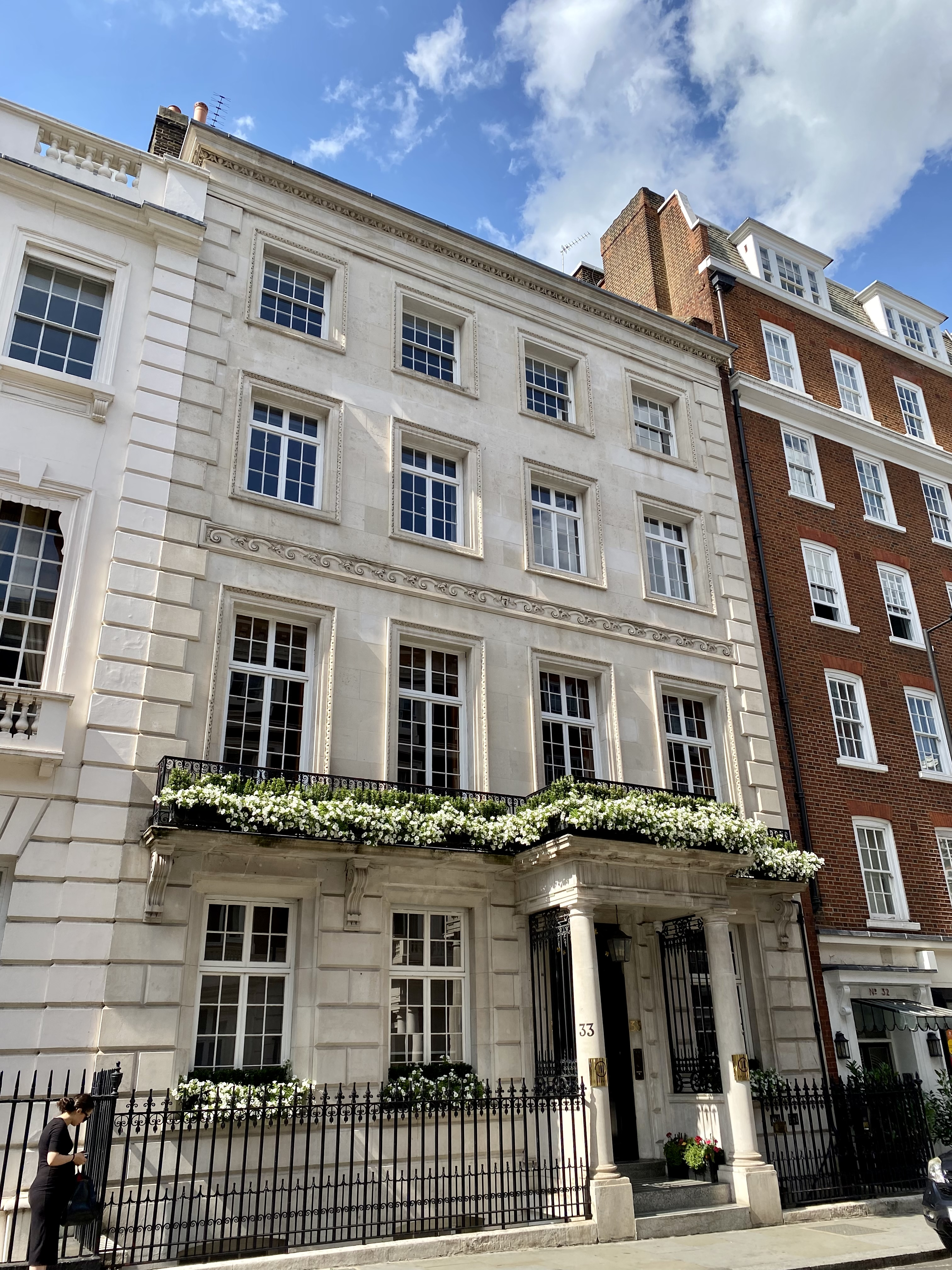
33 Grosvenor Street, Mayfair, June 2023, Princess Clara's residence in 1912

After her marriage, Princess Clara became prominent in aristocratic German and English society and was "the leading American hostess in London for many years." She attended Mrs. Adair's Fancy Dress Ball in London on 11 May 1903 costumed as Queen Esther wearing "...yellow chiffon with jewelled embroidery; a rose-coloured veil depending from an Oriental head-dress... sandals, and toe-rings on bare feet."

She collected jewelry, including a famous aquamarine necklace given to Emma Hartmann of White Lodge by Edward VII when he was Prince of Wales. Clara acquired it in 1910 and gifted it to her step-mother Arabella.

=== Death and estate battle ===
After a chill contracted a week earlier, Princess Clara died in London on 18 December 1928. Her funeral was held at the Roman Catholic Church in Windsor, where she was a parishioner for many years.

The principal heir of her estate was her friend, Philip Champion de Crespigny of Champion Lodge (younger brother of Claude Champion de Crespigny), who received $500,000 of the $1,000,000 trust (equivalent to $18,750,000 in 2025) established for the Princess by her uncle, two-thirds of her stock in Central South African Sands and Mines Ltd. and the residuary estate. Champion de Crespigny was named co-executor of her estate with the Central Union Trust Company of New York and Henry Beauchamp Harrison of London, who was to receive the balance of the stock, $150,000 of the fund as well as jewelry and other personal effects. (Note: Other bequests included $40,000 to Viscount Selby, $25,000 to Joseph Deighn Redding of San Francisco, $20,000 each to Baroness Alliott of Villano, Italy and Mrs. Lawrence Townsend (née Natalie Hannau, the composer) of 1416 Twentieth Street in Washington, D.C., and $15,000 each to H. Chalmers Robert and Maitland Kersey, both of London.)

Almost immediately after the will was filed, her extended family who were all excluded from the estate, began challenging the validity of the will and its codicils. In 1931, her estate was valued at $1,585,694 after the settlement of the will contest (equivalent to $33,570,218 in 2025).
