= Collis Potter Huntington =

American railroad magnate (1821–1900)

- Huntington c. 1880s
- Born: October 22, 1821; Harwinton, Connecticut, U.S.
- Died: August 13, 1900 (aged 78); Camp Pine Knot, Raquette Lake, New York, U.S.
- Resting place: Woodlawn Cemetery, Bronx, New York, U.S.
- Employer(s): Central Pacific Railroad; Southern Pacific Railroad; Chesapeake & Ohio Railway
- Known for: First transcontinental railroad
- Spouses: Elizabeth Stillman Stoddard (m. 1844; died 1883) Arabella Huntington (m. 1884)

Signature
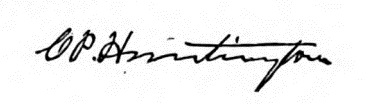

Collis Potter Huntington (October 22, 1821 – August 13, 1900) was an American industrialist and railway magnate. He was one of the Big Four tycoons of western railroading (along with Leland Stanford, Mark Hopkins, and Charles Crocker) who invested in Theodore Judah's idea to build the Central Pacific Railroad as part of the first U.S. transcontinental railroad. Huntington helped lead and develop other major interstate lines, such as the Southern Pacific Railroad and the Chesapeake & Ohio Railway (C&O), which he was recruited to help complete. The C&O, completed in 1873, fulfilled a long-held dream of Virginians of a rail link from the James River at Richmond to the Ohio River valley. The railroad facilities adjacent to the river there resulted in expansion of the former small town of Guyandotte, West Virginia, into part of a new city which was named Huntington in his honor.

Turning attention to the eastern end of the line at Richmond, Huntington directed the C&O's Peninsula Extension in 1881–82, which opened a pathway for West Virginia bituminous coal to reach coal piers on the harbor of Hampton Roads for export shipping. He also is credited with the development of Newport News Shipbuilding and Drydock Company, as well as the incorporation of Newport News, Virginia, as an independent city. After his death, both his nephew Henry E. Huntington and his stepson Archer M. Huntington continued his work at Newport News. All three are considered founding fathers in the community, with local features named in honor of each.

Much of the railroad and industrial development which Huntington envisioned and led are still important activities in the early 21st century. The Southern Pacific is now part of the Union Pacific Railroad, and the C&O became part of CSX Transportation, each major U.S. railroad systems. West Virginia coal is still transported by rail to be loaded onto colliers at Hampton Roads. Nearby, Huntington Ingalls Industries operates the massive shipyard at Newport News.

From his base in Washington, Huntington was a lobbyist for the Central Pacific and the Southern Pacific in the 1870s and 1880s. The Big Four had built a powerful political machine, which he had a large role in running. He provided considerable bribes to numerous politicians and congressmen. Revelation of his misdeeds in 1883 made him one of the most hated railroad men in the country.

Huntington defended himself:

The motives back of my actions have been honest ones and results have redounded far more to the benefit of California than they have to my own.

In 1968, Huntington was inducted into the Hall of Great Westerners of the National Cowboy & Western Heritage Museum.

== Biography ==
=== Education and early career ===
Huntington was born in Harwinton, Connecticut, on October 22, 1821. His family farmed and he grew up helping. In his early teens, he did farm chores and odd jobs for neighbors, saving his earnings. At age 16, he began traveling as a peddler. About this time, he visited rural Newport News in Warwick County, Virginia, in his travels as a salesman. He never forgot what he thought was the untapped potential of the area, where the James River emptied into the large harbor of Hampton Roads. In 1842 he and his brother Solon Huntington established a successful business in Oneonta, New York, selling general merchandise.

When Huntington saw opportunity in America's West, he set out for California. He set up as a merchant in Sacramento at the start of the California gold rush. Huntington succeeded in his California business. He teamed up with Mark Hopkins selling miners' supplies and other hardware.

=== Building the first U.S. transcontinental railroad ===
In the late 1850s, Huntington and Hopkins joined forces with two other successful businessmen, Leland Stanford and Charles Crocker, to pursue the idea of creating a rail line that would connect America's east and west. In 1861, these four businessmen (sometimes referred to as "The Big Four") pooled their resources and business acumen and formed the Central Pacific Railroad (CPR) company to create the western link of America's first transcontinental railroad. Of the four, Huntington had a reputation for being the most ruthless in pursuing the railroad's business; he ousted his partner, Stanford.

Huntington negotiated with Grenville Dodge, who was supervising railroad construction from the east, over where the railroads should meet. They completed their agreement in April 1869, deciding to meet at Promontory Summit, Utah. On May 10, 1869, at Promontory, the tracks of the Central Pacific Railroad joined with the tracks of the Union Pacific Railroad, and America had a transcontinental railroad.

=== Southern Pacific Railroad ===
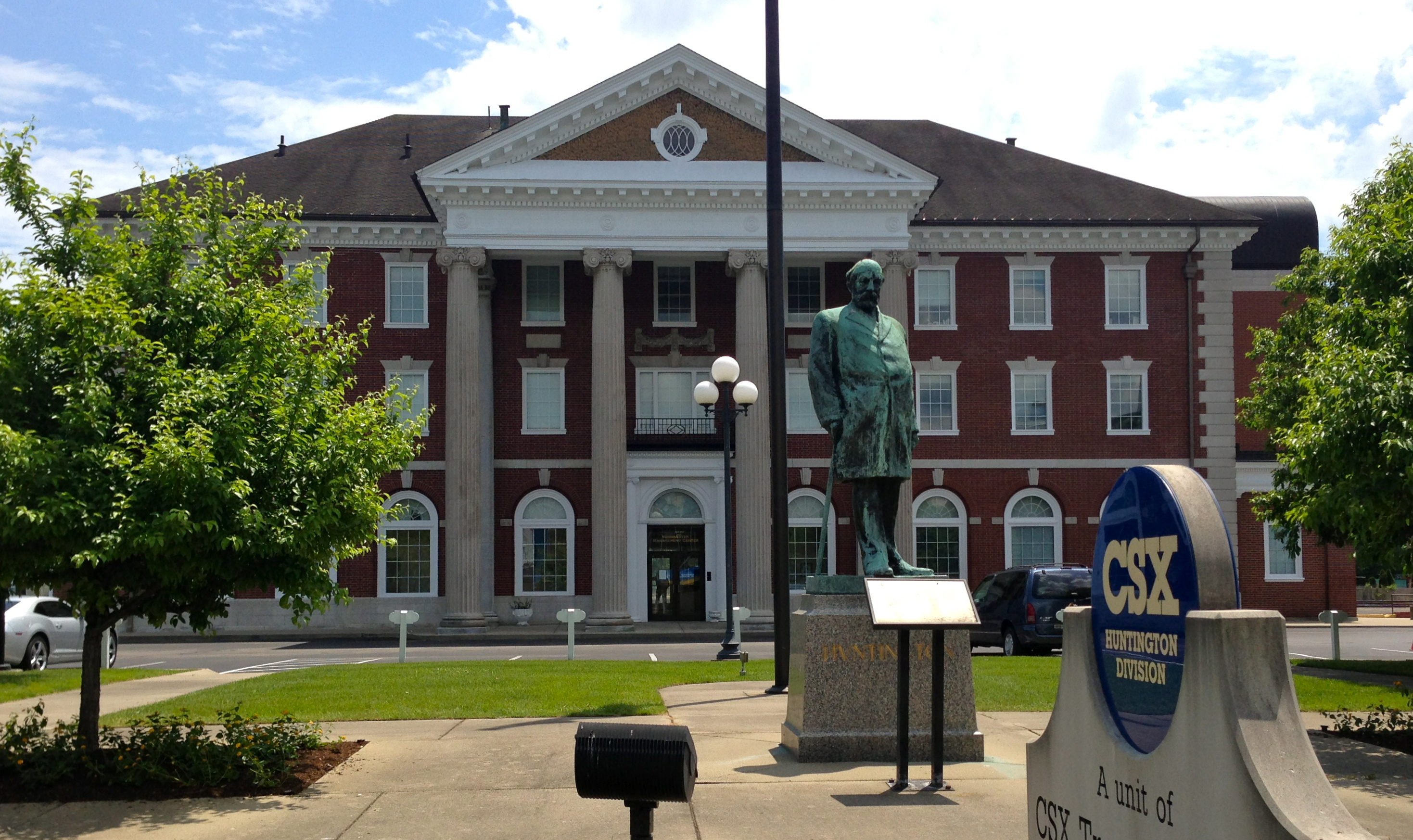
CSX (the former C&O Railway) Huntington Division Headquarters, with a statue of Collis P. Huntington by Gutzon Borglum in the foreground.

Beginning in 1865, Huntington was involved in the establishment of the Southern Pacific Railroad with the Big Four. The railroad's first locomotive C. P. Huntington, (transferred from the CPR), was named in his honor. With rail lines from New Orleans to the southwest and into California, Southern Pacific expanded to more than 9,000 miles of track. It also controlled 5,000 miles of connecting steamship lines. Using the Southern Pacific Railroad, Huntington endeavored to prevent the port at San Pedro from becoming the main Port of Los Angeles in the Free Harbor Fight.

=== Chesapeake and Ohio Railway, new cities and a shipyard ===
Following the American Civil War, efforts were renewed in Virginia to complete a canal or railroad link between Richmond and the Ohio River valley. Before the war, the Virginia Board of Public Works and the Virginia Central Railroad had provided financial assistance to construct a state-owned link through the Blue Ridge Mountains. It had been completed along this route as far as the upper reaches of the Shenandoah Valley when the war broke out.

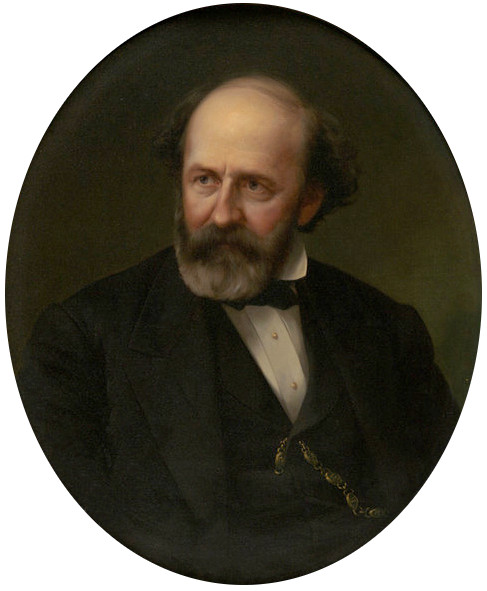
Portrait by Stephen William Shaw c. 1872

Officials of the Virginia Central, led by company president Williams Carter Wickham, realized that they would have to get capital from outside the economically devastated South in order to rebuild. They tried to attract British interests, without success. Finally, Wickham succeeded in getting Huntington interested helping to complete the line. Beginning in 1871, Huntington oversaw completion of the newly formed Chesapeake and Ohio Railway (C&O) from Richmond across Virginia and West Virginia to reach the Ohio River. There, with his brother-in-law Delos W. Emmons, he established the planned city of Huntington, West Virginia. He became active in developing the emerging southern West Virginia bituminous coal business for the C&O.

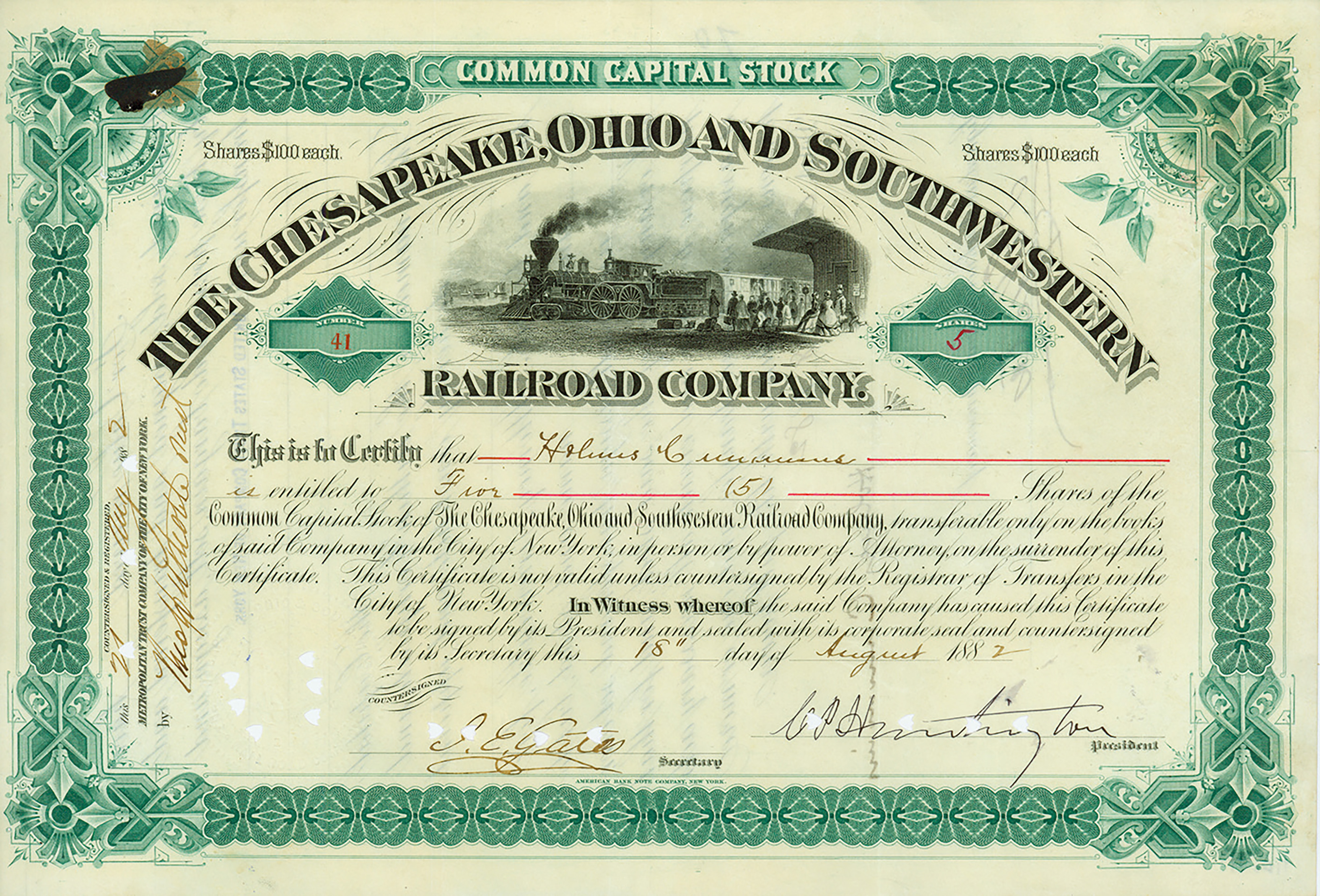
Share of the Chesapeake, Ohio and Southwestern Railroad Company, issued 18 August 1882, signed by Huntington

Beginning in 1865, Huntington had been acquiring land in Virginia's eastern Tidewater Region, an area not served by extant railroads. In 1880, he formed the Old Dominion Land Company and turned these holdings over to it. Beginning in December 1880, he led the building of the C&O's Peninsula Subdivision, which extended from the Church Hill Tunnel in Richmond east down the Virginia Peninsula through Williamsburg to the southeastern end of the peninsula on the harbor of Hampton Roads in Warwick County. Through the new railroad and his land company, coal piers were established at Newport News Point.

It may have taken more than 50 years after Virginia's first railroad operated for the lower peninsula to get a railroad, but once work started, it progressed quickly. In a manner he had previously deployed, notably with the transcontinental railroad and the line to the Ohio River, work began at both Newport News and Richmond. The crews at each end worked toward each other. The crews met and completed the line west of Williamsburg on October 16, 1881, although temporary tracks had been installed in some areas to speed completion.

Huntington and his associates had promised they would provide rail service to Yorktown where the United States was celebrating the centennial of the surrender of the British troops under Lord Cornwallis at Yorktown in 1781, an event considered most symbolic of the end of American Revolutionary War. Three days after the last spike ceremony, on October 19, the first passenger train from Newport News took local residents and national officials to the Cornwallis Surrender Centennial Celebration at Yorktown on temporary tracks that were laid from the main line at the new Lee Hall Depot to Yorktown.

No sooner had the tracks to the coal pier at Newport News been completed in late 1881 than the same construction crews were put to work on what would later be called the Peninsula Subdivision's Hampton Branch. It ran easterly about 10 miles into Elizabeth City County toward Hampton and Old Point Comfort, where the U.S. Army base at Fort Monroe guarded the entrance to the harbor of Hampton Roads from the Chesapeake Bay. The branch line served both the Hygeia Hotel and the Hotel Chamberlain, popular destinations for civilians. During the first half of the 20th century, excursion trains were operated to reach nearby Buckroe Beach, where an amusement park was among the attractions. Huntington built the landmark Hotel Warwick and founded the Newport News Shipbuilding and Drydock Company. This became the largest privately owned shipyard in the United States.

Huntington is largely credited with vision and the combination of developments which created and built a vibrant and progressive community. The 15 years of rapid growth and development led to the incorporation of Newport News as an independent city in 1896.

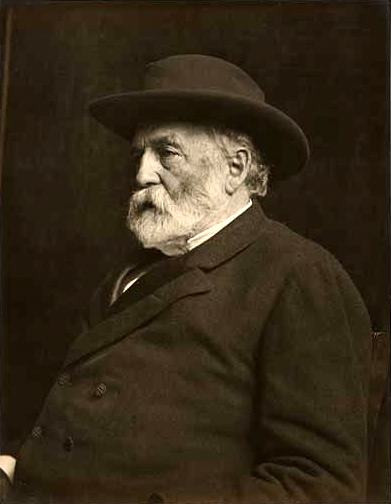
Huntington in later life.

Near the tracks of the C&O's Hampton Branch was a normal school, dedicated in its earliest years to training teachers to educate the South's many African-American freedmen after the Civil War and abolition of slavery. Most southern blacks had been denied opportunities for education literacy before the Civil War. The school which developed to become modern-day Hampton University was first led by former Union General Samuel Chapman Armstrong. When Armstrong suffered a debilitating paralysis in 1892 while in New York, he returned to Hampton in a private railroad car provided by Huntington, with whom he had collaborated on black education projects.

In the lower peninsula, Huntington along with some family members and their Old Dominion Land Company were involved in many aspects of life and business. They founded schools, museums, libraries and parks among their many contributions. In Williamsburg, the Old Dominion Land Company owned the historic site of the 18th-century capital buildings. This was transferred to the women who were the earliest promoters of what became Preservation Virginia.

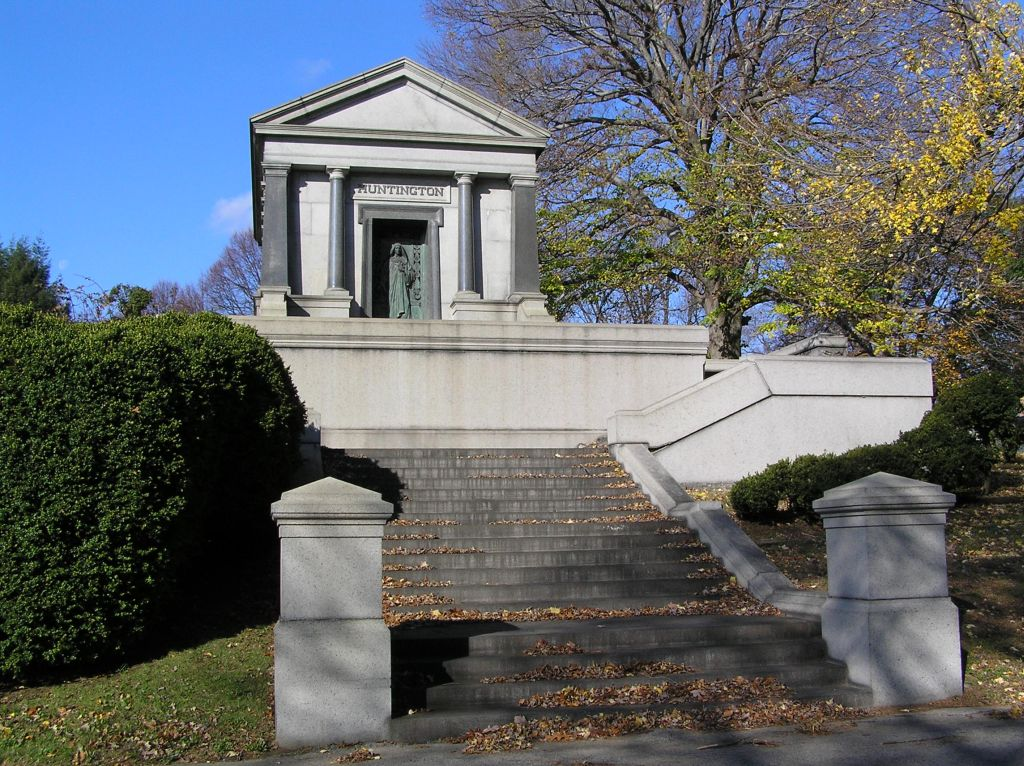
The mausoleum of Collis P. Huntington in Woodlawn Cemetery (Bronx, New York)

Huntington did not neglect his namesake city at the other end of the C&O. In order to supply freight cars to the C&O, and by extension to the Southern Pacific and Central Pacific Railroads as well, Huntington was a major financier behind Ensign Manufacturing Company. He based the company in Huntington, West Virginia, directly connecting to the C&O; Ensign was incorporated on November 1, 1872.

After Huntington's death in 1900, his nephew, Henry E. Huntington, assumed leadership of many of his industrial endeavors. The younger man quickly sold off all of the Southern Pacific holdings. He and other family members also continued and expanded many of the senior Huntington's cultural and philanthropic projects, in addition to developing their own.

Historian Howard Jay Graham has summarized Huntington's business acumen:

Huntington's career affords unique opportunity for study of the promoter's function—for observing "the entrepreneur as innovator"—hedging into the Central through a cautiously conceived wagon road to the booming Comstock; gaining state and county aid, cost data, experience in construction and finance; thus discovering the immense liberality of the federal subsidy; mobilizing every resource and building through to Ogden on a revolving fund basis; netting perhaps a million by these means; then, half-reluctantly, beginning over, making the C.P. build the S.P., and when it had, reversing the favorable leases, fattening up the Southern, reaping a second harvest from its bonds and stocks, also taken originally on construction contracts.

=== Death ===
Huntington died at his "camp," Pine Knot, in the Adirondack Mountains on August 13, 1900. He is interred in a Classical-style mausoleum at the Woodlawn Cemetery, Bronx, New York.

== Politics ==
A cartoon published in the San Francisco Examiner depicting Huntington as an octopus with his tentacles strangling (clockwise from top left) a farmer, a merchant, an orange raiser, the press, Oakland, San Francisco, the honest vote, and a manufacturer, 1896

In addition to his railroad building, Huntington is best known for his political activity in Washington, D.C., and California. At this stage he was based mostly in New York and visited California about once a year. Stanford remained president, first of the Central Pacific and then of the Southern Pacific Company, until 1890. Huntington was agent and attorney for the Southern Pacific Railroad, vice-president and general agent for the Central Pacific Railroad, first vice-president of the Southern Pacific Company, and a director of the two lines. His main duties were selling company stocks and bonds and acting as the chief lobbyist in Washington, where his two main challenges were to block federal support for a proposed rival transcontinental route, the Texas and Pacific Railway (in which he succeeded) and to postpone payment of the $28 million in cash loans the government had made to the Central Pacific (in which he did not). He first asked to delay payments for fifty years, then for a hundred years. His proposal to cancel the loans created a firestorm of opposition in California, covered colorfully in the newspapers by Ambrose Bierce; when it was defeated in Congress in 1897, the governor of California celebrated by declaring a public holiday. Huntington lost the battle in Congress in 1899 and the Southern Pacific finally paid off the loans in 1909.

Huntington described his activities in a series of private letters to David D. Colton, a senior financial official of his railroads. After Colton's death, litigation opened his files in 1883, and Huntington's letters proved a huge embarrassment, with their detailed descriptions of lobbying, payoffs, and bribes to government officials. They showed Huntington to be an active, profane, and cynical promoter of his companies and display his eagerness to use money to bribe congressmen. The letters did not demonstrate that any cash actually changed hands with any official, but they revealed the tenor of Huntington's morals.

His biographer says,

he was vindictive, sometimes untruthful, interested in comparatively few things outside of business, and disposed to resist the idea that his railroad enterprises were to any degree burdened with public obligations. There is, on the other hand, no question with respect to his indomitable energy, his shrewdness in negotiation, his independence of thought and raciness of expression, and his grasp of large business problems. He was the dominant spirit among the small group of men who built up the Southern Pacific system, and that great organization remains his monument.

According to historian Richard J. Orsi,

[Huntington] was an ardent opponent of racial prejudice and discrimination....Huntington had been an abolitionist before the Civil War, and he later donated hundreds of thousands of dollars to support African American churches in California, and schools and colleges in the southern states....Though it was politically unwise, Huntington ordered his companies to give equal employment and pay to black workers, and he publicly opposed the exclusions of black and other non-white children from public schools, as well as other “Jim Crow” restrictions then being enacted in the South and elsewhere. In newspaper columns and public speeches in the West, Huntington praised the Chinese for their culture and industry, and condemned state and federal discrimination against American Indians and Chinese, Filipino, and Japanese immigrants. “If we deny to the individual, no matter what his creed, his color or his nationality, the right to justice which every man possesses,” he told a gathering of California civic and railway leaders in 1900, “there will be no enduring prosperity and [the nation’s] decline will surely follow.

== Family ==
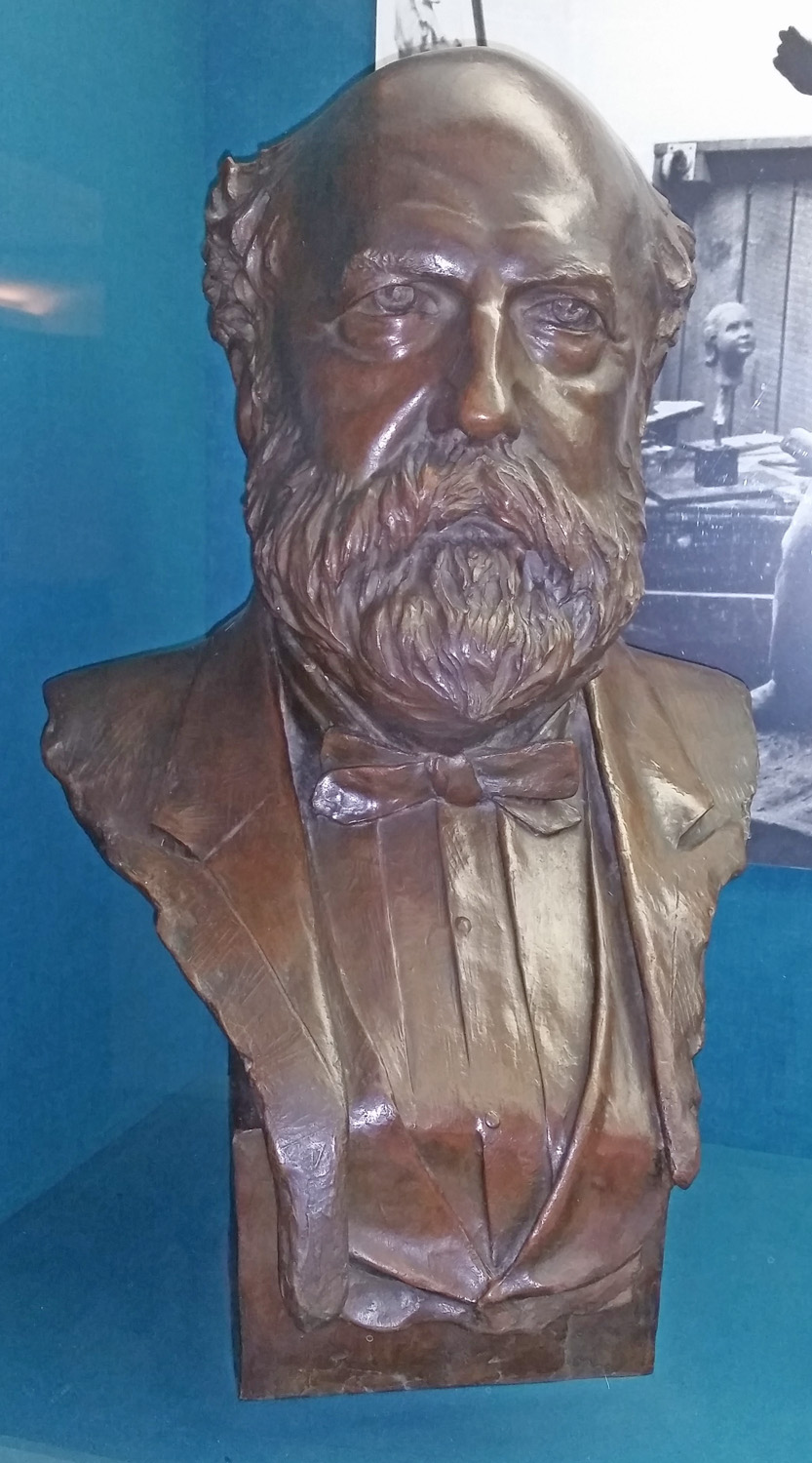
Bust of Collis made by Anna Hyatt Huntington in the collection at The Mariners Museum.

Huntington was the son of William and Elizabeth (Vincent) Huntington; born October 22, 1821, in Harwinton, Connecticut. His siblings were:

1. Mary (February 17, 1810 – March 9, 1874); married Daniel Sammis of Warsaw, New York.
2. Solon (January 13, 1812 – August 11, 1890); married Harriet Saunders of Saratoga, New York.
3. Rhoda (October 13, 1814 – May 22, 1888); married Riley Dunbar of Wolcottville.
4. Phebe (September 17, 1817 – February 4, 1900); married Henry Pardee of Oneonta, New York.
5. Elizabeth (December 19, 1819 – 1903); married Hiram Yaker of Kortright, New York.
6. Collis Potter (October 22, 1821 – August 13, 1900)
7. Joseph (March 23, 1823 – February 23, 1849); never married
8. Susan Lovinia (August 28, 1826 – 1902); married William Porter, M.D., of New Haven, Connecticut
9. Ellen Maria (August 12, 1835 – October 22, 1920); married Isaac E. Gates of Orange, New Jersey. She was known as a poet and hymn writer.

Huntington married Elizabeth Stillman Stoddard (1823–1883), of Cornwall, Connecticut, on September 16, 1844. They adopted her niece, Clara Elizabeth Prentice, born in Sacramento in 1860. Clara Elizabeth Prentice-Huntington (1860–1928), as she was called, married Prince Franz Edmund Joseph Gabriel Vitus von Hatzfeldt-Wildenburg, a.k.a., Francis Hatzfeldt of the House of Hatzfeld, Germany, on October 28, 1889. They made their home at Draycot House, Draycot Cerne, Wiltshire, England.

Huntington remarried on July 12, 1884, to Arabella D. Worsham (1851–1924). She brought to the marriage her son Archer Milton Worsham, from her first marriage, whom Huntington adopted that year. At 14, he became known as Archer Milton Huntington. There were rumors that Huntington had a longer relationship with Arabella and that he was the biological father of her son.

Archer Huntington became a well-known Hispanist and founded The Hispanic Society of America, a museum and rare-books library dedicated to Spanish and Portuguese history, art, and culture, based in upper Manhattan, in New York City. Archer and his second wife, sculptor Anna Hyatt Huntington, founded Brookgreen Gardens sculpture and botanical gardens near Murrells Inlet, South Carolina. He also founded the Mariners' Museum in Newport News, one of the largest of its kind in the world.

Huntington's nephew, Henry E. Huntington (1850–1927), was also a railway magnate and founder of the Huntington Library, Art Collections and Botanical Gardens in San Marino, California. He was active in Los Angeles where he was the main force behind development of the Pacific Electric system.

He was also related to Clarence Huntington, a president of the Virginian Railway who succeeded Urban H. Broughton. He was the son-in-law of the VGN's founder, industrialist Henry Huttleston Rogers.

== Charity ==
He acquired a substantial collection of art, and was generally recognized as one of the country's foremost art collectors. He left most of his collection, valued at $3 million, to the Metropolitan Museum of Art in New York, to pass into the museum's hands after the death of his stepson, Archer. His last will directed that if his stepson should die childless (which he did), Huntington's Fifth Avenue mansion or the proceeds from the sale of the property would go to Yale University. He also made specific bequests totaling $125,000 to Hampton University (then Hampton Institute) and to the Chapin Home for the Aged.

== Legacy ==
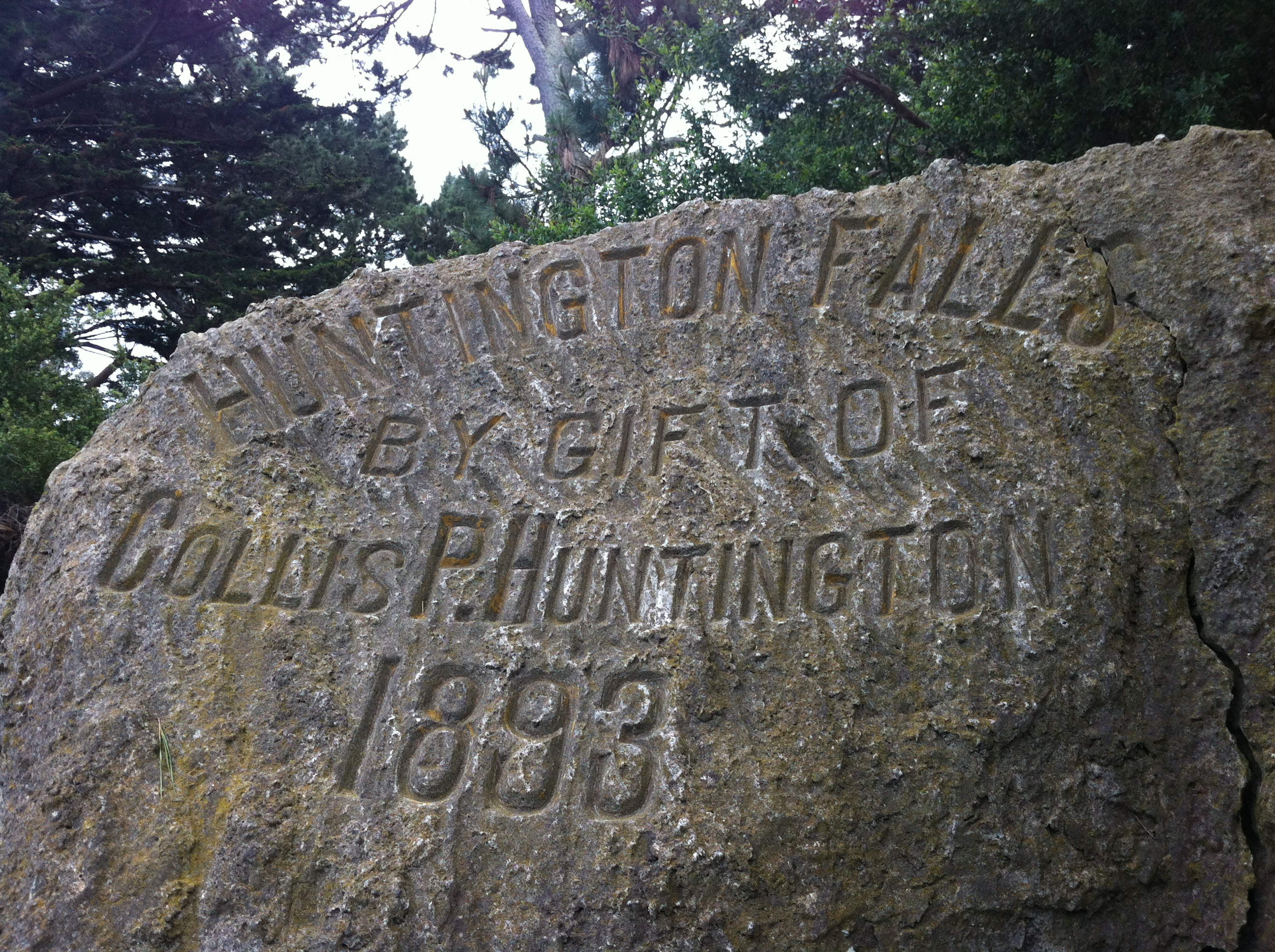
Huntington Falls, Golden Gate Park, San Francisco

=== Buildings ===
- Collis P. Huntington High School, Newport News, Virginia
- Huntington Hotel – San Francisco, California
- Huntington Free Library and Reading Room – Bronx, New York
- Collis P. Huntington Academic Building; Tuskegee University, Alabama (Destroyed in a fire)
- Huntington Dorm; Tuskegee University, Alabama
- Collis P. Huntington House, New York City
- C. P. Huntington Primary School in Sacramento, California
- Collis Potter and Howard Edwards Huntington Memorial Hospital in Pasadena, California
- Huntington Hall – U.S. Navy enlisted housing and USO 3100 Huntington Avenue, Newport News, Virginia
- Collis P. Huntington Memorial Library – Hampton University Now, the Hampton University Museum, Hampton, Virginia
- Huntington Hall; Fort Valley State University, Fort Valley, Georgia

=== Inhabited places ===
- Huntington, West Virginia
  - Collis and Huntington Avenues in Huntington, West Virginia
- Huntington, Texas in Angelina County, Texas
- Huntingdon, Abbotsford, neighborhood in Abbotsford, British Columbia
- North End Huntington Heights Historic District, residential district in Newport News, Virginia

=== Other ===
- Camp Pine Knot, also known as Camp Huntington, on Raquette Lake, New York, which is now owned by the State University of New York at Cortland
- Collis P. Huntington State Park, Redding and Bethel, Connecticut
- Huntington Park, and Huntington Avenue, Newport News, Virginia
- Huntington Park, the site of his San Francisco home that was destroyed by the 1906 earthquake and fire
- Mount Huntington, a peak in Fresno County, California
- Collis Place in Bronx County, New York, which is located several blocks from Huntington's riverside mansion.
- Tugboat Huntington – retired 1994, now a floating exhibit and classroom at the Palm Beach Maritime Museum, Palm Beach, Florida
- Collis Avenue, a residential street that starts at Huntington Drive in the El Sereno district of the City of Los Angeles and ends in the City of South Pasadena, California
- Huntington Boulevard in Fresno, California
- C.P. Huntington, a 4-2-4T steam locomotive currently owned by the California State Railroad Museum
- SS Collis P. Huntington, a Liberty Ship built in World War II

== See also ==
- History of rail transportation in California

== References and further reading ==
- Ambrose, Stephen E. (2000). Nothing Like It In The World; The men who built the Transcontinental Railroad 1863–1869. Simon & Schuster. ISBN 0-684-84609-8. Note: the factual accuracy of this book has been widely criticized. See Stephen E. Ambrose#Criticism.
- Carman, Harry J., and Charles H. Mueller. "The Contract and Finance Company and the Central Pacific Railroad." Mississippi Valley Historical Review (1927): 326–341. in JSTOR
- Daggett, Stuart. "Huntington, Collis Potter," Dictionary of American biography (1932), vol. 5
- Deverell, William. Railroad Crossing: Californians and the Railroad, 1850–1910 (1994) online
- Evans, Cerinda W. Collis Potter Huntington (2 vols., 1954), highly laudatory and uncritical biography online volume 1; also see vol 2 online
- Huddleston, Eugene L. "Huntington, Collis Potter", American National Biography Online (2014). Access Date: Jan 26 2016
- Lavender, David, The great persuader: the biography of Collis P. Huntington, University Press of Colorado, 1998 reprint, first published 1970. ISBN 0-87081-476-1
- Lewis, Oscar. The Big Four: The story of Huntington, Stanford, Hopkins, and Crocker, and of the Building of the Central Pacific (1938)
- Rayner, Richard, The Associates: Four Capitalists Who Created California, Norton, 2007. ISBN 0-393-05913-8
- Traxler Jr, Ralph N. "Collis P. Huntington and the Texas and Pacific Railroad Land Grant." New Mexico Historical Review 34.2 (1959): 117–133. online
- Williams, R. Hal. The Democratic Party and California Politics, 1880–1896 (1973) online.
- White, Richard. "Corporations, Corruption, and the Modern Lobby: A Gilded Age Story of the West and the South in Washington, D.C.", Southern Spaces, video of lecture by Richard White, Stanford University, April 16, 2009.
- White, Richard (2011). Railroaded: The Transcontinentals and the Making of Modern America. W. W. Norton & Company. ISBN 978-0-393-06126-0.
- "Collis Potter Huntington" in: Prominent and progressive Americans; an encyclopædia of contemporaneous biography. Compiled by Mitchell Charles Harrison. Publisher: New York Tribune, 1902
