= Franz von Hatzfeldt-Wildenburg =

German aristocrat and racehorse owner (1853–1910)

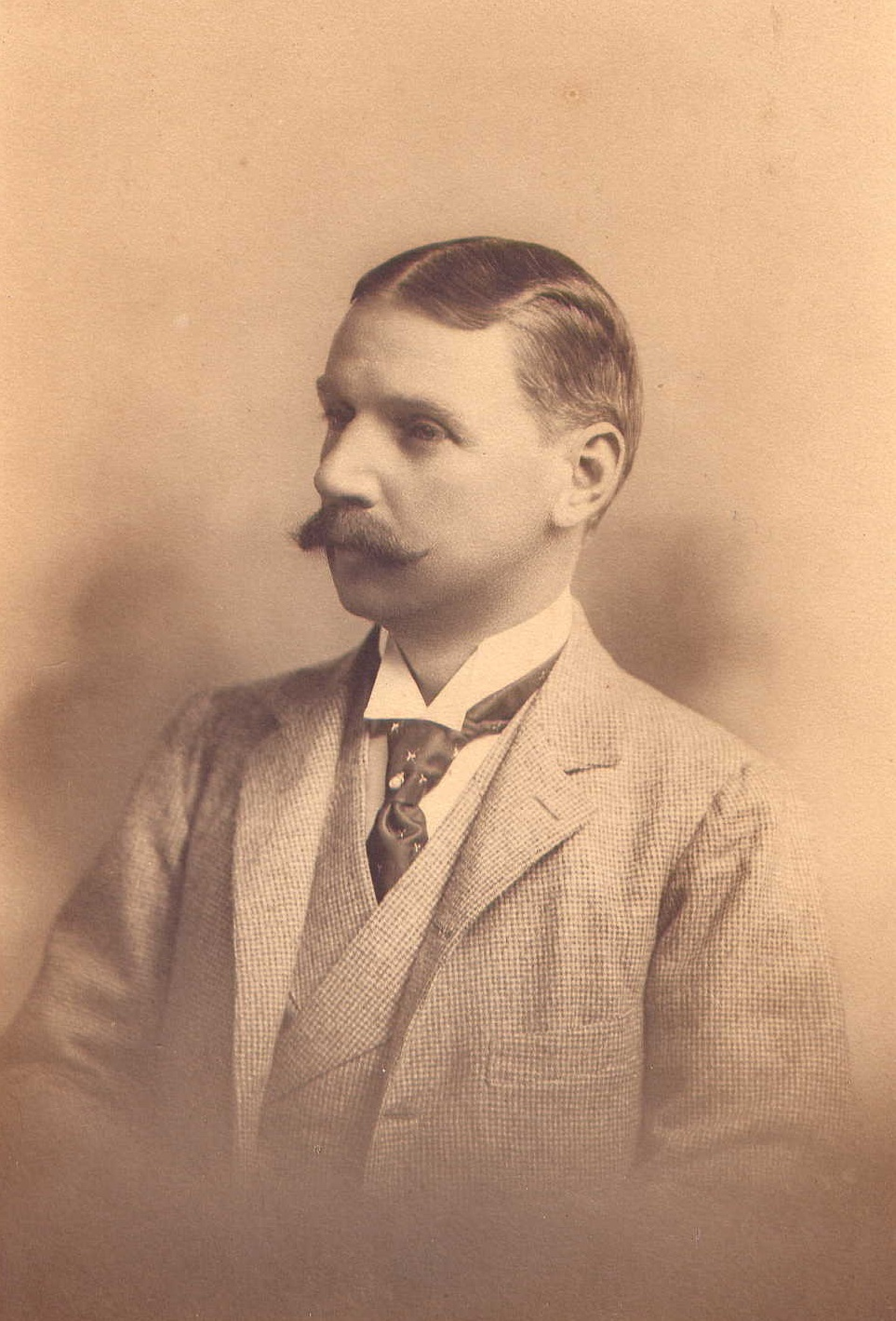
Prince Franz von Hatzfeldt-Wildenburg (1906)

Franz Edmund Joseph Gabriel Vitus Prinz von Hatzfeldt-Wildenburg (15 June 1853 – 4 November 1910) was a German aristocrat and a racehorse owner.

== Early life and ancestry ==
Franz was born at Marxheim in Bavaria on 15 June 1853. He was the only son of Alfred, Prince von Hatzfeldt-Wildenburg (1825–1911) and Countess Gabriele von Dietrichstein-Proskau-Leslie (1825–1909). His younger sister Antonia (1856–1933) married Count Michael Robert von Althann (1853–1919).

The marriage of his paternal grandparents, who were distant cousins, Count Edmund von Hatzfeldt-Wildenburg (1798-1874) and Countess Sophie von Hatzfeldt-Trachenberg (1805–1881) (a daughter of Prussian general Prince Franz Ludwig von Hatzfeldt zu Trachenberg) unified the House of Hatzfeld. The Hatzfeld-Wildenburg-Weisweiler branch of the Hatzfeldt family had inherited Crottorf, Schönstein, Kalkum among other properties in 1794 and became Prussian Princes of Hatzfeldt-Wildenburg in 1870. His uncle was Count Paul von Hatzfeldt (1831–1901), the German Ambassador to the United Kingdom. His maternal grandparents were Joseph Franz, Prince of Dietrichstein and the former Gabriele, Countess Wratislav von Mitrowitz (1804–1880). From her parents, Franz's mother inherited Lipník nad Bečvou, Hranice na Moravě and the rest of her family's Moravian estates.

== Career ==
After being educated in the academies of Germany, he took an interest in the diplomatic services and served as an attaché in the German Embassy in Washington, D.C.

A noted race-horse owner, on 30 March 1906 Prince Franz's horse, Ascetic's Silver, captured the 1906 Grand National which took place at Aintree near Liverpool, England.

== Personal life ==
Franz met Clara Elizabeth Prentice-Huntington, and reportedly "became infatuated with her." He met her again at the house of the U.S. Ambassador McLane in Paris and then he followed her to Aix-les-Bains. She was the adopted daughter of American industrialist and railway magnate Collis P. Huntington and his first wife, Elizabeth Stillman (née Stoddard) Huntington, who was Clara's biological aunt. After their engagement was announced, Franz was described by The New York Times on 21 August 1889, as follows:

He is tall and fair, with stooping shoulders. No particular fault has ever been found with the Prince, except a chronic impecuniosity and a decided inclination to contract debts that there was no prospect of paying, except he should capture such a prize as he has caught. In short, he has exhibited what has been aptly termed by a favorite American comedian 'a wine taste on a beer income.' His obligations are set by London clubmen, by whom he was always considered a jolly good fellow, at about 4,000,000£ but had not enough money to cut much of a figure. He has been a patron of all the fashionable European watering places, and has been most assiduous in cultivating the acquaintance of rich American girls at Monte Carlo, Baden, Homburg, and other resorts. He has figured conspicuously in several unsavory gambling episodes, one of which, about two years ago, attracted such widespread attention as to cause the Prince to retire for a time. His father and mother are extremely popular both at Berlin and Vienna, but the Prince is regarded as a black sheep and has severed his connection with both the Diplomatic Service and the army."

On 28 October 1889, Prince Franz von Hatzfeldt was married to Clara at St Wilfrid's Chapel at Brompton Oratory in London by the Bishop of Emmaus. The bride was given away by her father and the Prince was attended by his cousin, Count Hermann (Count Paul's son), and Prince Hohenlohe as groomsmen. After their marriage, they lived at Hatzfeldt Castle at Schönstein-on-the-Rhine before leasing Draycot House at Draycot Cerne in Wiltshire, England in 1896. Clara's father died in 1900, and Clara received a "fortune of more than $2,000,000", a sum which was later increased to $6,000,000 by agreement with Collis' widow.

Prince Franz died in London on 4 November 1910, seven months before his father (who died on 3 June 1911). As they had no children, his princely rights and estates were inherited by his cousin, Count Hermann von Hatzfeldt-Wildenburg (the only son of Count Paul von Hatzfeldt), who was the last Prince of Hatzfeldt-Wildenburg. (Note: After Prince Hermann von Hatzfeldt-Wildenburg's death in 1941, the estates were inherited by Count Hermann von Dönhoff who took on the name of his mother's family: Count von Hatzfeldt-Dönhoff. Today, his family is one of the largest landowners in Rhineland-Palatinate, also owning the castles of Crottorf and Schönstein.) His widow, who never remarried, died in England on 18 December 1928.

== Ancestry ==
Ancestors of Franz von Hatzfeldt-Wildenburg

8. Edmund Karl Eugen, Count of Hatzfeldt-Wildenburg
4. Edmund Gottfried Cornelius, Count of Hatzfeldt-Wildenburg
9. Baroness Friederike von Hersell
2. Alfred, 1st Prince of Hatzfeldt-Wildenburg
10. Franz Ludwig, 1st Prince of Hatzfeldt-Trachenberg
5. Countess Sophie von Hatzfeldt-Trachenberg
11. Countess Friederike Karoline von der Schulenburg-Kehnert
1. Prince Franz von Hatzfeldt-Wildenburg
12. Franz Joseph, 8th Prince of Dietrichstein
6. Joseph Franz, 9th Prince of Dietrichstein
13. Countess Alexandra Andrejevna Shuvalova
3. Countess Gabriele von Dietrichstein-Proskau-Leslie
14. Count Josef Antonín Wratislav von Mitrowitz
7. Countess Gabriele Wratislav von Mitrowitz
15. Countess Marie Gabriele Des Fours-Walderode
