= Los Angeles streetcar strike of 1919 =

- A red car overturned during the 1919 streetcar strike.
- Date: August 1–6, 1919
- Location: Los Angeles, California
- Methods: Striking

The Los Angeles streetcar strike of 1919 was the most violent revolt against the open-shop policies of the Pacific Electric Railway Company in Los Angeles. Labor organizers had fought for over a decade to increase wages, decrease work hours, and legalize unions for streetcar workers of the Los Angeles basin. After having been denied unionization rights and changes in work policies by the National War Labor Board, streetcar workers broke out in massive protest before being subdued by local armed police force.

== Henry E. Huntington and anti-union leaders ==
Henry E. Huntington was a notorious anti-labor businessman. His distaste of unions ran so deep that Huntington joined alliance with multiple labor opponents to ensure that unions would remain subdued. Huntington shared like-minded ideas with the likes of David M. Parry, the president of the National Association of Manufacturers (NAM) and Harrison Gray Otis, owner and publisher of the Los Angeles Times. The National Association of Manufacturers was established in 1895 and had originally promoted trade and commerce, but by 1903 it began to side with anti-strike and anti-union ideologies. Huntington and Parry worked together to demand legislation for making boycotting illegal and protecting strikebreakers and nonunion workers. Otis had been working to ensure that his publication aligned with anti-unionism policies since the 1880s. He framed supporters of unions in a highly negative light and claimed that strikers were deserters who should not be allowed into the Los Angeles community. Otis utilized the Los Angeles Times to share the ideas of men of power that union men could not be trusted and that labor leaders sought to undermine and destroy companies.

Huntington’s involvement went beyond sharing ideas with powerful men. He supported and funded organizations that supported companies that fell victim to unions and strikes. He battled labor movements locally alongside the Los Angeles Merchants and Manufacturers Association as well as the Citizens' Alliance. The Merchants’ and Manufacturers Association (M&M) was founded in the 1890s to work with emerging businesses to encourage mediation between employers and its workers. After a union-organized strike against the Los Angeles Times in 1902, M&M shifted its platform and began to publicly attack organized labor. Over 80 percent of local businesses were members of M&M. Businessmen were strong-armed into supporting open-shop policies with threats of cutting off bank credit, denying advertisements in the Los Angeles Times, and withholding shipment of materials to companies, forcing them to buy from competitors. The Los Angeles Citizens' Alliance (LACA) was founded in Los Angeles in 1904 and was over six thousand people strong. Members could participate so long as they did not participate in any labor unions. Huntington heavily sent his support to LACA by both joining and financially backing the organization. LACA ensured the safety of its companies from unions and boycotts by providing its members one dollar per day for each worker that walked off from a strike.

== Pacific Electric vs. organized labor ==
=== 1901–1903 ===
Huntington faced his first encounter with labor in Los Angeles in 1901 when the Los Angeles Railway's platform men—and motormen—demanded that their hourly wages be increased from twenty to twenty-two and a half cents per hour. In June the employees accepted the company's counterproposal of a progressive wage scale based on seniority men with under four years experience would be paid twenty cents per hour, those with four years twenty-one cents, and those with five or more years at the Los Angeles Railway twenty-two cents per hour. This created a huge setback for union unity. Instead of working for a common cause, each worker sought to work towards personal gain. This dilemma increased once Huntington threatened to fire anyone who joined a union. An effort was made by the Los Angeles Council of Labor in 1901 and 1902 to amalgamate the streetcar workers in the Los Angeles Basin. Huntington trampled the attempts of the council with threats of firing employees caught joining the cause.

Organizers from San Francisco came to Los Angeles and organized the Local No. 203 of the Amalgamated Association of Street Railway Employees in 1903 despite Huntington’s work against unions in years prior. The new local gained steam and quickly accumulated over 200 in membership. Previously dismissed employees attempted to call up strikes on two separate occasions in March and April, but Huntington did not tolerate any of it. Managers were ordered to fire employees that participated or sympathized with the strike and police force were used against employees attempting to march out. Huntington rewarded employees that chose to stay loyal to the company with a ten percent wage increase.

The following labor clash in April 1903 known as the Pacific Electric Railway Strike of 1903 was caused by the unrest of racial divides in labor practices. The Amalgamated Association of Street Railway Employees decided to assist the Mexican laborers working in the Huntington construction gangs to organize their own union. Mexican laborers were hired to lay track in the southwest because their low wage rate, $1.00 to $1.25 for a ten-hour day, was significantly less than other minorities, such as the Chinese, who collected up to $1.75 per day for the same work. The Mexican Federal Union was formed in 1903 and raised great support in the community. Work on the Main Street line was stopped and demands were made to Pacific Electric for increased wages. Huntington refused to meet these demands and replaced them with black, Japanese, and white laborers while still paying them higher wages than had been paid towards the Mexicans.

=== 1910–1917 ===
Clashes between organized labor and Pacific Electric simmered until labor efforts were renewed in 1910. Metal trade workers began a large strike and great tensions were created between employers and workers in Los Angeles as a result. The Amalgamated Association of Street Railway Employees took advantage of the discourse and organized the Los Angeles trainmen and created Carmen's Local No. 410. The organization lobbied the state to create a ten-hour workday for local and interurban railway workers. The movement failed because employers threatened to fire anyone found participating in the movement. From 1913 to 1915, the amalgamated workers fought for lower work shifts and higher wages but found themselves blocked by powerful enemies of labor.

Pacific Electric found a new tactic for subduing the labor movement by creating a company union in 1917. Huntington chose General Manager George Kuhrts as the group's president, and other officers were elected by the workers. The union established a board selected by workers to air employee grievances and make employee desires known to management. But it had no administrative authority and served in a purely advisory capacity.

=== The 1918–1919 strikes ===
The most intense strike for the railway workers occurred in two stages between 1918 and 1919. World War I caused great inflation in prices in Los Angeles. Streetcar crews worked over ten hour shifts and pay increases averaged only 50 percent over a period when the cost of living had risen nearly 75 percent. The vice-president of the Amalgamated Association of Street Railway Employees, Ben Bowbeer, began to unionize workers with strong support from federal government wage-adjustment bureaus in 1918. Labor leaders fueled with renewed energy pulled their efforts together to create the Amalgamated Division 835. The union applied to the National War Labor Board (NWLB) in the fall of 1918 for an increase in wages and an eight-hour workday. The eight-hour workday was granted, but Huntington did not implement it. Once again, streetcar workers went on strike. This time, the US naval commander sent armed sailors on the Red Cars to threaten the streetcar conductors. The city also served injunctions declaring that workers had agreed to open-shop policies upon their employment and that their demands to unionize were illegal.

In 1919 the streetcar unions petitioned the National War Labor Board again for union recognition and were denied a second time, resulting in violent resistance. The Mexican tracklayers walked out in solidarity, strikers greased streetcar wheels, trolleys were overturned from their tracks, and a riot broke out on August 20 in downtown Los Angeles. Ultimately, railway workers walked away with a pay increase and the Los Angeles Railway management continued its open-shop policies. Wartime politics would greatly impede organized labor activity in the coming years.

== See also ==
- Pacific Electric Railway strike of 1903
