= Henry E. Huntington =

American railroad magnate (1850–1927)

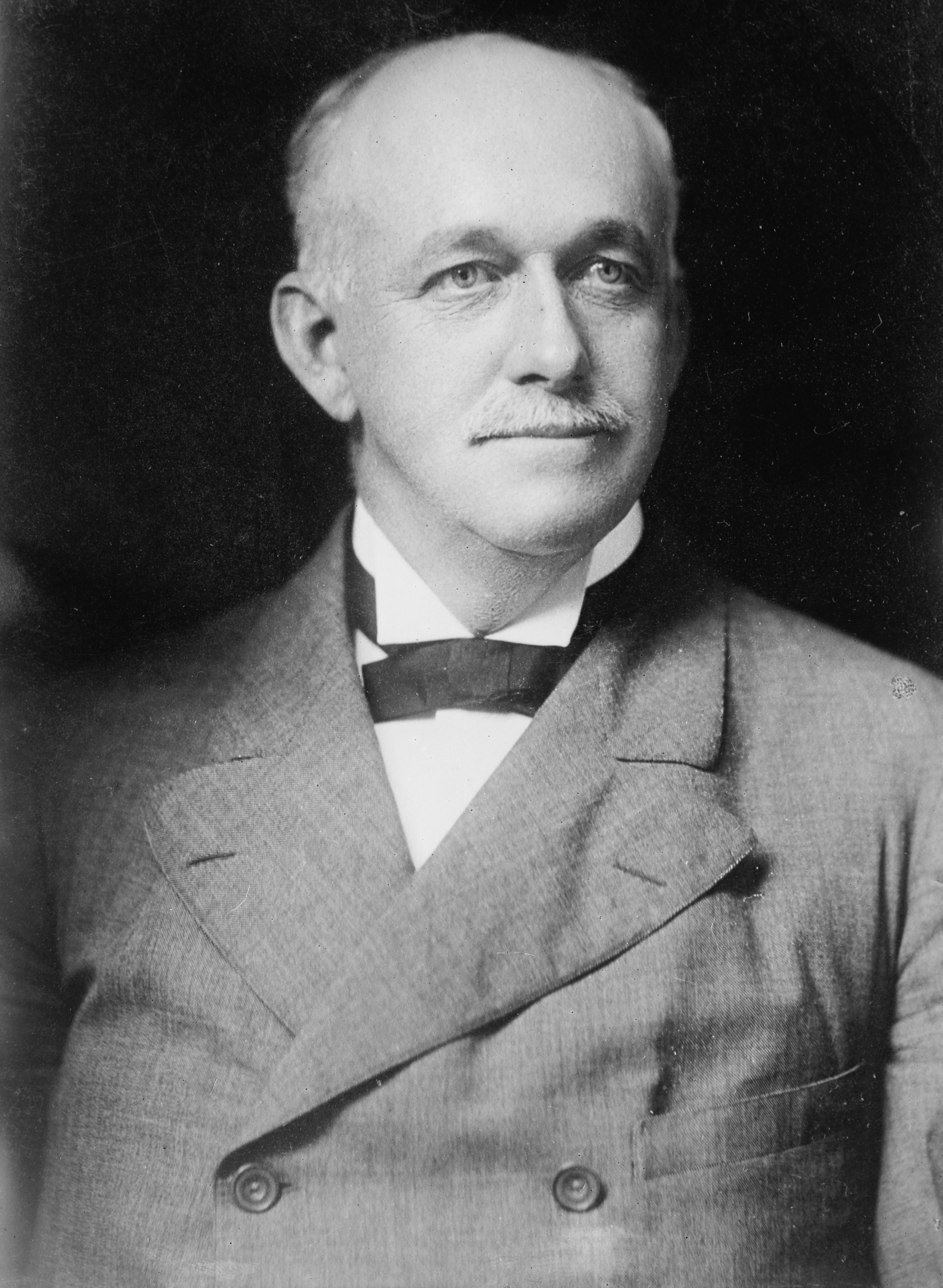
- Born: February 27, 1850; Oneonta, New York, US
- Died: May 23, 1927 (aged 77); Philadelphia, Pennsylvania, US
- Spouses: Mary Alice Prentice; Arabella Huntington

Henry Edwards Huntington (February 27, 1850 – May 23, 1927) was an American railroad magnate and collector of art and rare books. He settled in Los Angeles, where he owned the Pacific Electric Railway and substantial real estate interests. He was a major booster for Los Angeles in the late 19th and early 20th centuries, and many places in California are named after him.

== Career ==
Huntington was born in 1850 in Oneonta, New York, to Solon Huntington and his wife. His uncle Collis P. Huntington became one of The Big Four who were instrumental in creating the Central Pacific Railroad, one of the two railroads that built the transcontinental railway in 1869.

Huntington later worked with his uncle, holding several executive positions under him with the Southern Pacific. Collis Huntington died in 1900, and Henry Huntington assumed the leadership role with Newport News Shipbuilding and Drydock Company in Virginia.

Huntington expected to assume control of the Central and Southern Pacific after his uncle's death, but he was blocked by bondholder's representative James Speyer, forcing him to sell his interests to E. H. Harriman.

In 1898, Huntington bought the narrow gauge city-oriented Los Angeles Railway (LARy), known as the "Yellow Car" system. In 1901, he formed the sprawling interurban, standard gauge Pacific Electric Railway (PE), known as the "Red Car" system centered at 6th and Main streets in Los Angeles. Huntington succeeded in this by providing passenger-friendly streetcars on round-the-clock schedules, which the railroads could not match.

In 1905, Huntington, A. Kingsley Macomber, and William R. Staats developed the Oak Knoll subdivision located to the west of his San Marino estate in the oak-covered hilly terrain near Pasadena.

By 1910, the Huntington trolley systems spanned approximately 1,300 miles (2,100 km) of Southern California. At its greatest extent, the system contained over 20 streetcar lines and 1,250 trolleys, most running through the core of Los Angeles and serving such nearby neighborhoods as the Crenshaw district, West Adams, Echo Park, Westlake, Hancock Park, Exposition Park, Vernon, Boyle Heights, and Lincoln Heights. The system integrated the Mount Lowe Scenic Railway above Altadena, California in the San Gabriel Mountains.

=== Huntington Hotel ===
The Huntington Hotel was originally named Hotel Wentworth when it opened on February 1, 1907. Financial problems and a disappointing first season forced it to close indefinitely. Henry Huntington purchased the Wentworth in 1911, renaming it the Huntington Hotel. It reopened in 1914, transformed into a winter resort. The 1920s were prosperous for the hotel, as Midwestern and Eastern entrepreneurs discovered California's warm winter climate.

The hotel's reputation for fine service began with long-time general manager and later owner Stephen W. Royce. By 1926, the hotel's success prompted Royce to open the property year-round. The "golden years" ended with the stock market crash and the Great Depression of the late 1920s and early 1930s. By the end of the 1930s the hotel was vibrant again. When World War II began, all reservations were cancelled and the hotel was rented to the Army for $3,000 a month. Following the war, the Huntington's fortunes improved again. In 1954 Stephen Royce sold the hotel to the Sheraton Corporation, serving as general manager until his retirement in 1969. The hotel operated until 1985, when it closed because of its inability to meet seismic standards. The structure was built of reinforced concrete in 1906.

After a 2 1/2-year major renovation, the hotel reopened in March 1991 as the Ritz Carlton Huntington Hotel and Spa. The hotel completed a $19 million renovation in January 2006; it changed hands in early 2007 and became Langham Brand International, Huntington Hotel & SPA.

== Personal life ==
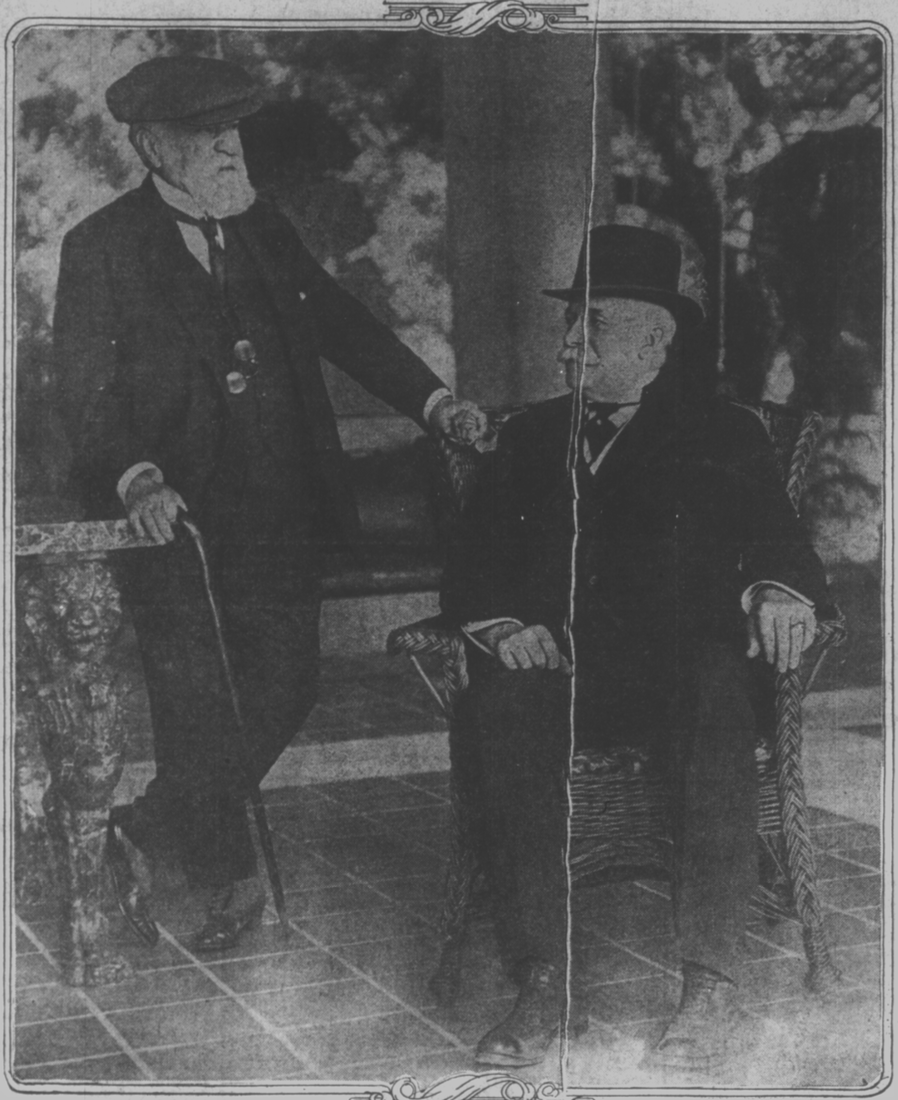
Henry E. Huntington (seated) with Baron Randolph Natili in 1914

Following the death of his uncle, Collis, in 1900; Huntington purchased a California ranch in 1902, formerly belonging to James de Barth Shorb (on land inherited from his father-in-law, Benito Wilson, which he then named San Marino), and began developing his California estate.

In about 1900, Huntington relocated to California, separating from his first wife, Mary Alice Prentice Huntington (1852–1916), the sister of Clara von Hatzfeldt, who was wed to a German prince. In 1906, they were divorced; Mary Alice sailed to Japan with their youngest daughter that same day. The couple had four children: Howard Edward (1876–1922); Clara Leonora Perkins (born 1878); Elizabeth Vincent Metcalf (born 1880); and Marian Prentice Huntington (1883–1973). In 1913, he married Arabella (born Yarrington), the widow of his uncle, Collis, which shocked San Francisco society. The couple had no children.

Huntington, Frank Miller (owner of the Mission Inn), and Charles M. Loring formed the Huntington Park Association, in 1906. Their intention was to purchase Mount Rubidoux in Riverside, build a road to the summit, and develop the hill as a park to benefit the city of Riverside. The road was completed in February 1907. The property was later donated to the city of Riverside by the heirs of Frank Miller, and today the hill is a 161-acre (0.65 km^{2}; 0.252 sq mi) city park.

Huntington was a Life Member of the Sons of the Revolution in the State of California.

Huntington retired from business in 1916. He died in Philadelphia while undergoing surgery on May 23, 1927. He and Arabella are buried in the Mausoleum of the Huntington Library in San Marino, California.

== Legacy ==
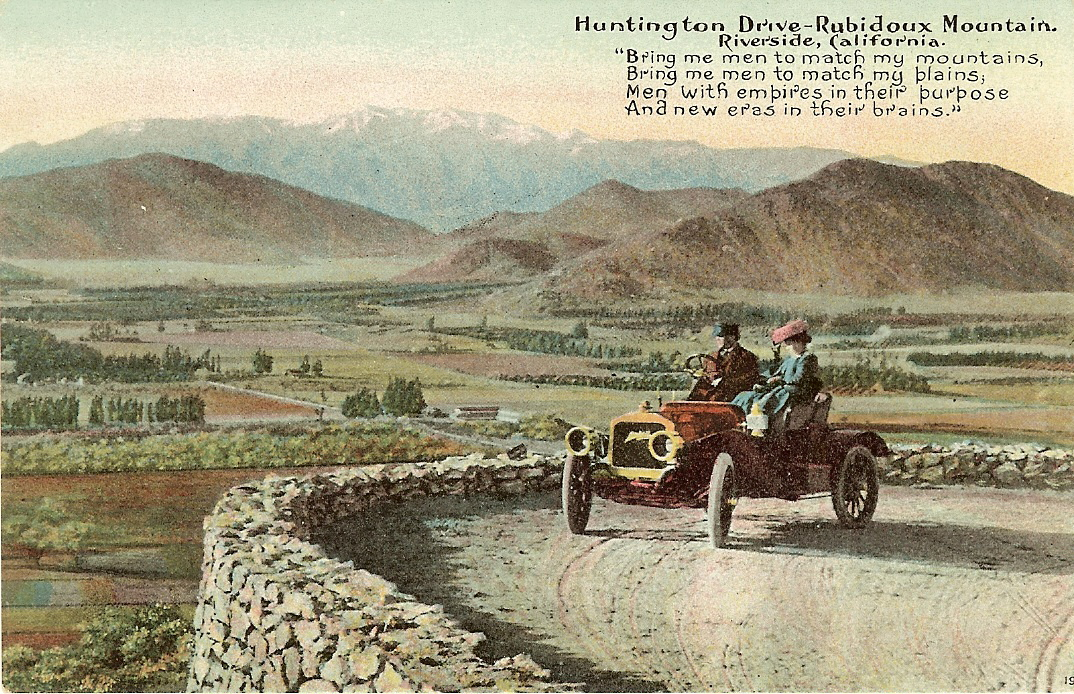
Postcard of sightseers, circa 1910, driving up Mount Rubidoux in Riverside, California via Huntington Drive

Huntington left a prominent legacy with the Huntington Library, Art Museum, and Botanical Gardens on his former estate in San Marino near Pasadena. Other legacies in California include the cities of Huntington Beach and Huntington Park, as well as Huntington Lake. Also in greater Los Angeles are the Huntington Hospital in Pasadena, Henry E. Huntington Middle School in San Marino, and Huntington Drive running eastbound from downtown Los Angeles.

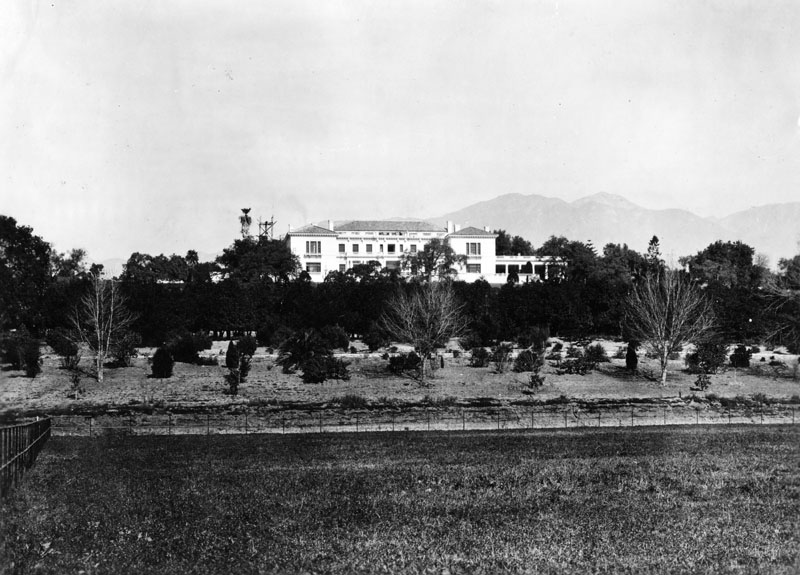
The Huntington Mansion, 1915; now the centerpiece of the Huntington Library

Riverside's city park on Mount Rubidoux was originally named Huntington Park, and the road to the top was named Huntington Drive. Frank Miller's heirs donated the property to the city; the city renamed the park the Frank A. Miller Rubidoux Memorial Park, and the road has become known as Mount Rubidoux Drive. A plaque was dedicated to Huntington in 1907 in recognition of his contributions to the development of Mount Rubidoux. After Huntington's death, a second tablet was placed on the north side of the hill at a place named the Huntington Shrine.

The SS Henry E. Huntington, a Liberty Ship built in World War II, was named for him.

His legacy on the East Coast includes the Huntington Memorial Library in Oneonta, New York.

== See also ==
- 1919 Streetcar Strike of Los Angeles
- Pacific Electric Railway strike of 1903
