= Pacific Electric Railway strike of 1903 =

Mexican tracklayer industrial dispute

Los Angeles streetcar strike of 1903
- Date: April 24 – 29, 1903
- Location: Los Angeles, California
- Methods: Striking

Parties
Union Federal Mexicanos	Pacific Electric Railway

Lead figures
Santa Teresa Urrea	Henry E. Huntington

Number
~700	

The Pacific Electric Railway strike of 1903 was an industrial dispute between Mexican tracklayers and their employers on the construction of the Main Street streetcar line in Los Angeles. The dispute began on April 24 when the workers, known as the "Traqueros", demanded higher wages to match those of the European immigrants working on the same project, and stopped work. It ended on April 29 when the union organising the strike failed to persuade workers on rest of the streetcar system to join the strike, and the labourers returned to work.

The strike was organised by the Union Federal Mexicanos, representing about 700 workers. Their employer, Henry E. Huntington, hired replacement workers for the duration of the strike from other projects at higher rates of pay, in order to meet the deadline for completion of the line, which coincided with the visit of President Theodore Roosevelt.

== Demands ==
The strikers demanded wages to increase roughly three cents from 17.5 cents an hour to 20 cents an hour for those working the day shift, 30 cents an hour for night work, and double time pay on Sunday. Mexican workers were paid less than southern European immigrants such as Italians who earned $1.75 a day in contrast to Mexican workers $1.25 a day for a ten-hour shift.

== Background ==
On April 24, 1903 approximately 700 Mexican track workers, working on Main St in Downtown Los Angeles, walked off the job in protest of the low wages they received. The Strikers worked for Pacific Electric Railway owned by Henry E. Huntington, a notorious anti-union businessman. The strike was organized by the Union Federal Mexicanos a newly-created union that was supported by the Amalgamated Association of Street Car Employees. Both unions were established by the Los Angeles Council of Labor. The Union Federal is important because it was likely the first union in the United States to represent Mexican track workers.

At first the managers of Pacific Electric succumbed to the workers demands and granted a 20 cents an hour wage. Huntington quickly retracted the increases because he did not want to deal with a union. A spokesman for Pacific Electric told the Los Angeles Times that Huntington "would have raised wages if only the workers came to him instead of bringing the union." The spokesman further elaborated that the company would pay the workers five dollars a day if they had to but they absolutely would not deal with the union and the strikers would not be rehired.

Mexican laborers accepted such low wages because the pay was double of what they would be paid in Mexico for similar work. The higher wages made it difficult for railroad employers in Mexico to keep a steady workforce.

== Strategies of Union Federal Mexicanos ==
The Union’s response to Huntington bringing in strike breakers was to have all members of the Union form a picket line on Friday April 24, 1903. The picket line was intended to get the strike breakers, many of whom were Mexican, to walk off the job and join them as well. The picket line did not succeed because the LAPD surrounded the strikers preventing them from communicating with strike breakers. Some strikers sneaked on to the job site to talk the workers individually, but the foreman caught them and evicted them.

After picketing failed, a group of women marched onto the site Saturday April 25, 1903 and confronted the strike breakers, seizing their tools so they would stop working. The women were likely the wives, mothers, and sisters of the strikers who felt the need to stand in solidarity.

The track workers received the help of Santa Teresa Urrea, a Mexican Catholic leader that sided with the working class. Her presence had such an impact that when she marched down Main street at least 50 workers dropped their tools and joined Urrea. Huntington brought in 200 men from El Paso, Texas to keep the project on schedule.

A major tactic of the Union Mexicanos was to stay off the job until April 29, 1903 when the street car operators were to go on strike and put a stop to the entire transit system. With both the operators and track layers on the strike the goal was to disrupt the completion of the track in time for President Theodore Roosevelt’s visit. The disruption was supposed to force Huntington to succumb to the demands of the workers and grant them their wage increase. The motorman and conductors were all to go on strike at 7:30 PM. At the proposed hour only 12 of the 764 street car workers walked off the job. The operators were intimidated by Huntington who gave an ultimatum, anyone that goes on strike would be fired indefinitely. The railroad company also kept police and strike breakers ready in case the operators did strike. This lack of solidarity between the street car operators and track workers undermined the power of the strike and made Huntington the victor.

== Strategies used by Pacific Electric against the strikers ==
Huntington brought in laborers from other rail projects in the area such as Long Beach and the Southbay. The workers brought in to finish the Main street job were paid 22 cents an hour, a two cent increase over the demands of the strikers. Huntington raised the wages for three reasons, one was for attracting replacements to come in and finish laying track. Second, was that Huntington had a deadline to finish the track by May 6 for the Fiesta and arrival of President Roosevelt. Lastly, the higher pay was intended to weaken the strike and the strikers affiliation to Union Mexicanos as well as to avoid having replacement Mexican workers joining the strike. The strikers were helped by women relatives on April 26 when they infiltrated the work site and got at least fifty workers to put down their tools. Huntington also had the help of the Los Angeles Times which wrote negatively about the strikers. In one article the paper called the workers "peons, stupid fellows who don't know what a union is." The same article than describes the women that influenced men to drop their tools as "Amazons".

== End of strike ==
The strike lost momentum and ended after April 29 when the motor men did not strike. With an abundance of laborers, Huntington was able to defeat the strike and finish the rail line by the time Roosevelt arrived. It appears the strike was not very big judging by the interpretation of the Los Angeles Times that said for the police they "probably had the dullest Saturday night all year." Another reason for the strike ending is that many of the strikers found work elsewhere because most people found the work to be grueling, not a job they would keep for long.

== Significance of strike ==
The strike marks the first time Mexican workers strike against their employer. It also breaks the stereotype Mexicans were given such as Mexican workers being docile and easy to control.

== See also ==
- 1919 Streetcar Strike of Los Angeles
