= House of Hatzfeld =

German noble family

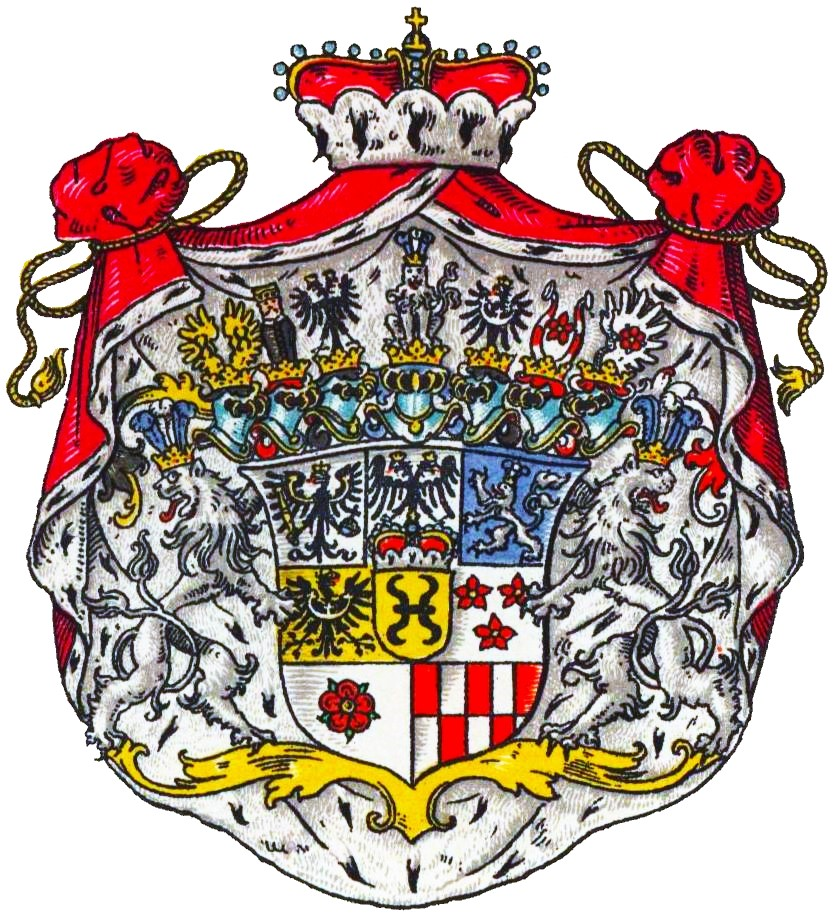
Hatzfeld(t) princely coat of arms

The House of Hatzfeld, also spelled House of Hatzfeldt, is the name of an ancient and influential German noble family, whose members played important roles in the history of the Holy Roman Empire, Prussia and Austria.

== History ==
They belonged to high nobility originally from Hesse. The family is first mentioned in 1138 and has its ancestral seat in Hatzfeld. In 1418 the family inherited Wildenburg Castle near Friesenhagen, a Lordship with Imperial immediacy, from the Lords of Wildenburg.

== Titles ==
Melchior von Hatzfeld (1593–1658), Imperial field marshal in the Thirty Years' War, became the first Count in 1635. He was enfeoffed with Trachenberg Castle in Silesia in 1641, and Gleichen Castle with the town of Wandersleben in Thuringia in 1651.

Franz Phillip Adrian became the first Prussian Fürst (Prince of Hatzfeld-Gleichen-Trachenberg) in 1741 (the branch extinguished in 1794). The Hatzfeldt-Werther-Schönstein branch inherited Trachenberg and became Prussian Princes of Hatzfeldt and Trachenberg in 1803 and Prussian Dukes of Trachenberg in 1900 (still existing). They lost their estates, including Trachenberg, when Silesia became part of Poland in 1945, whose Communist government expelled most of Silesia's German population.

The Hatzfeld-Wildenburg-Weisweiler branch inherited Crottorf, Schönstein, Kalkum as well as numerous other properties in 1794 and became Prussian Princes of Hatzfeld-Wildenburg in 1870 (the branch extinguished in 1941 and was inherited by Count Hermann von Dönhoff who took on the name of his mother's family as Count von Hatzfeldt-Dönhoff). He is one of the largest landowners in Rhineland-Palatinate, also owning the castles of Crottorf and Schönstein.

== Notable members ==
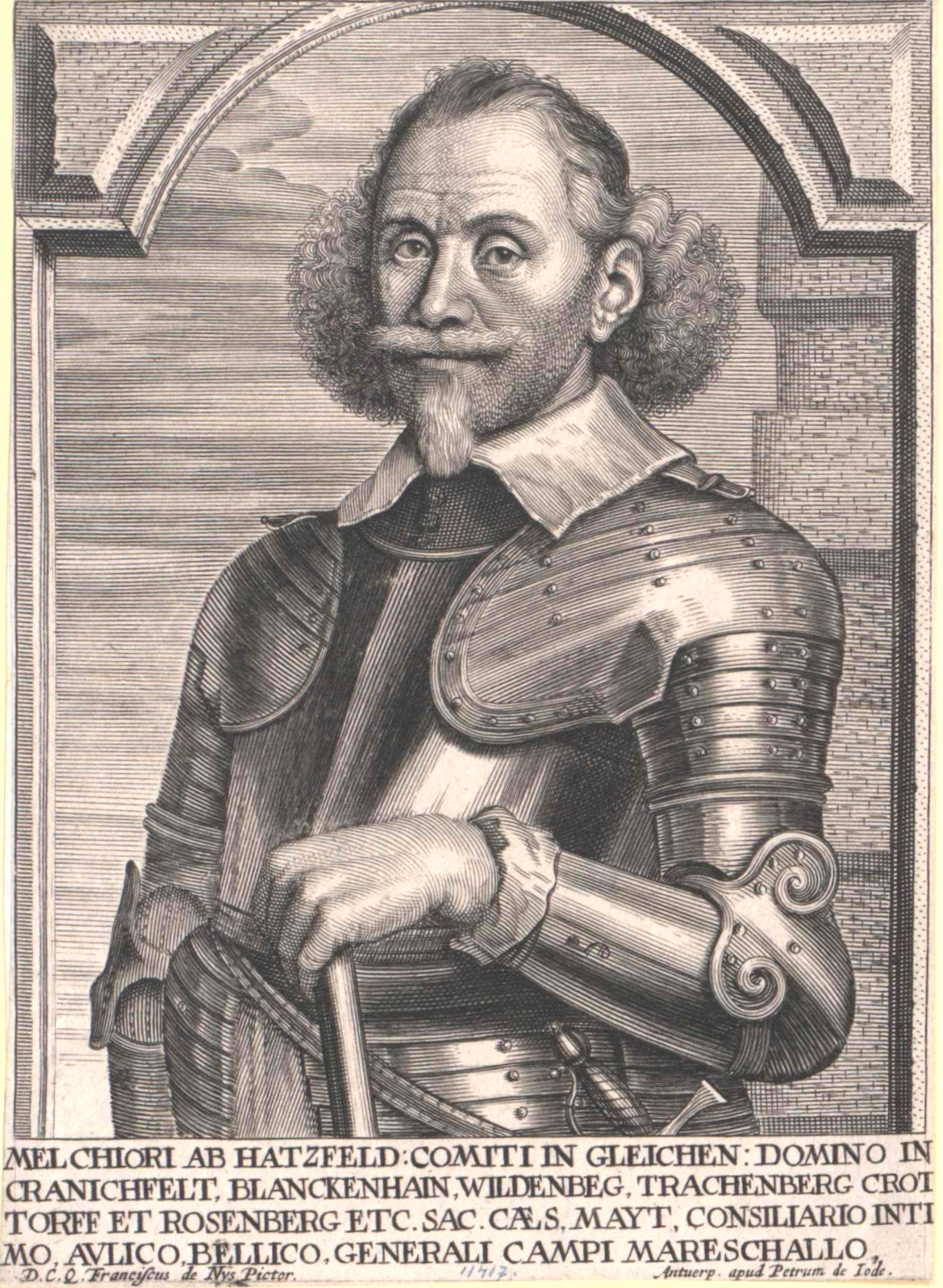
Count Melchior von Hatzfeldt (1593–1658), field marshal in the Thirty Years' War

- Melchior von Hatzfeld (1593–1658), field marshal in the Thirty Years' War
- Franz von Hatzfeld (1596–1642), Prince-Bishop of Bamberg
- Carl Friedrich Hatzfeldt zu Gleichen (1718–1793), Austrian statesman
- Franz Ludwig von Hatzfeldt (1756−1827), Prussian general
- Sophie von Hatzfeldt (1805–1881), "The Red Countess"
- Max von Hatzfeldt (1813–1859), diplomat
- Paul von Hatzfeldt-Wildenburg (1831–1901), diplomat and Foreign Secretary of Germany
- Elisabeth von Hatzfeldt (1839–1914), Princess of Carolath-Beuthen
- Hermann von Hatzfeldt zu Trachenberg (1848–1933), politician and landowner
- Prince Franz Edmund J.G.V. von Hatzfeldt-Wildenburg (1853-1910), race-horse owner
- Princess Clara von Hatzfeldt-Wildenburg (1860-1928), heiress
- Hermann von Hatzfeldt-Wildenburg (1867–1941), diplomat and landowner
- Georg von Hatzfeld (1929–2000), publisher and politician

== Residences ==
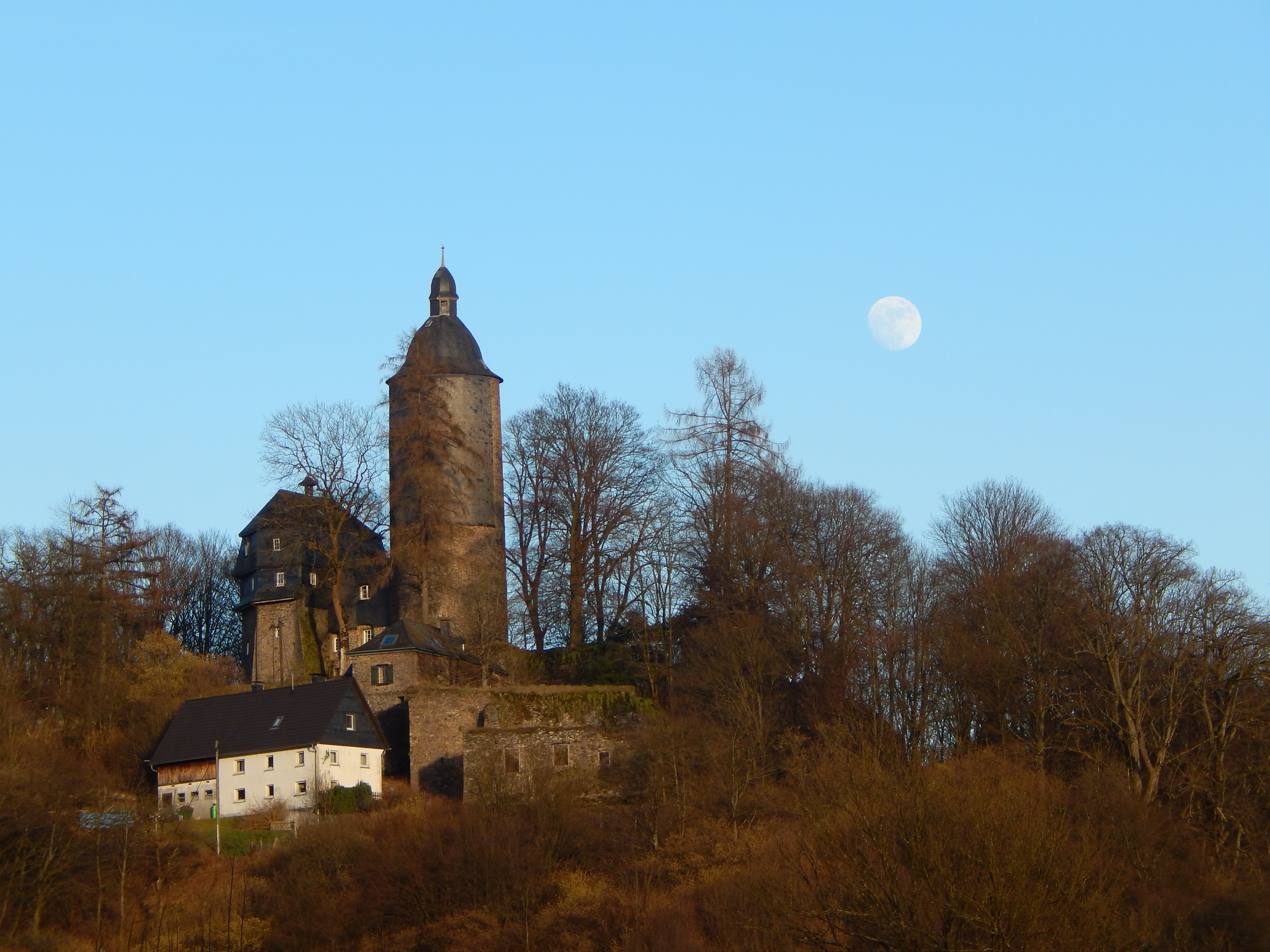
Ruin of Wildenburg Castle

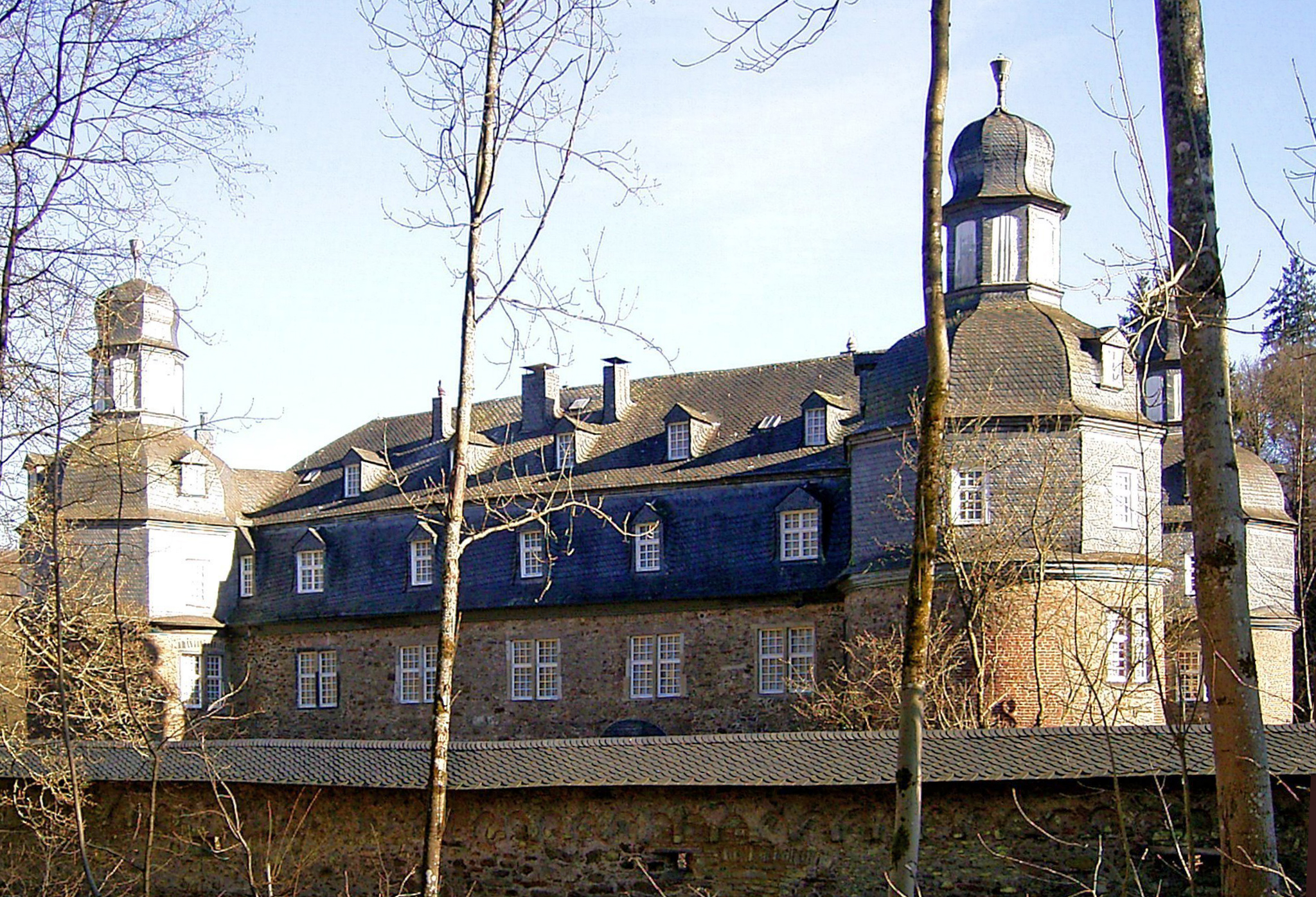
Crottorf Castle near Friesenhagen (since 1563 owned by the family)

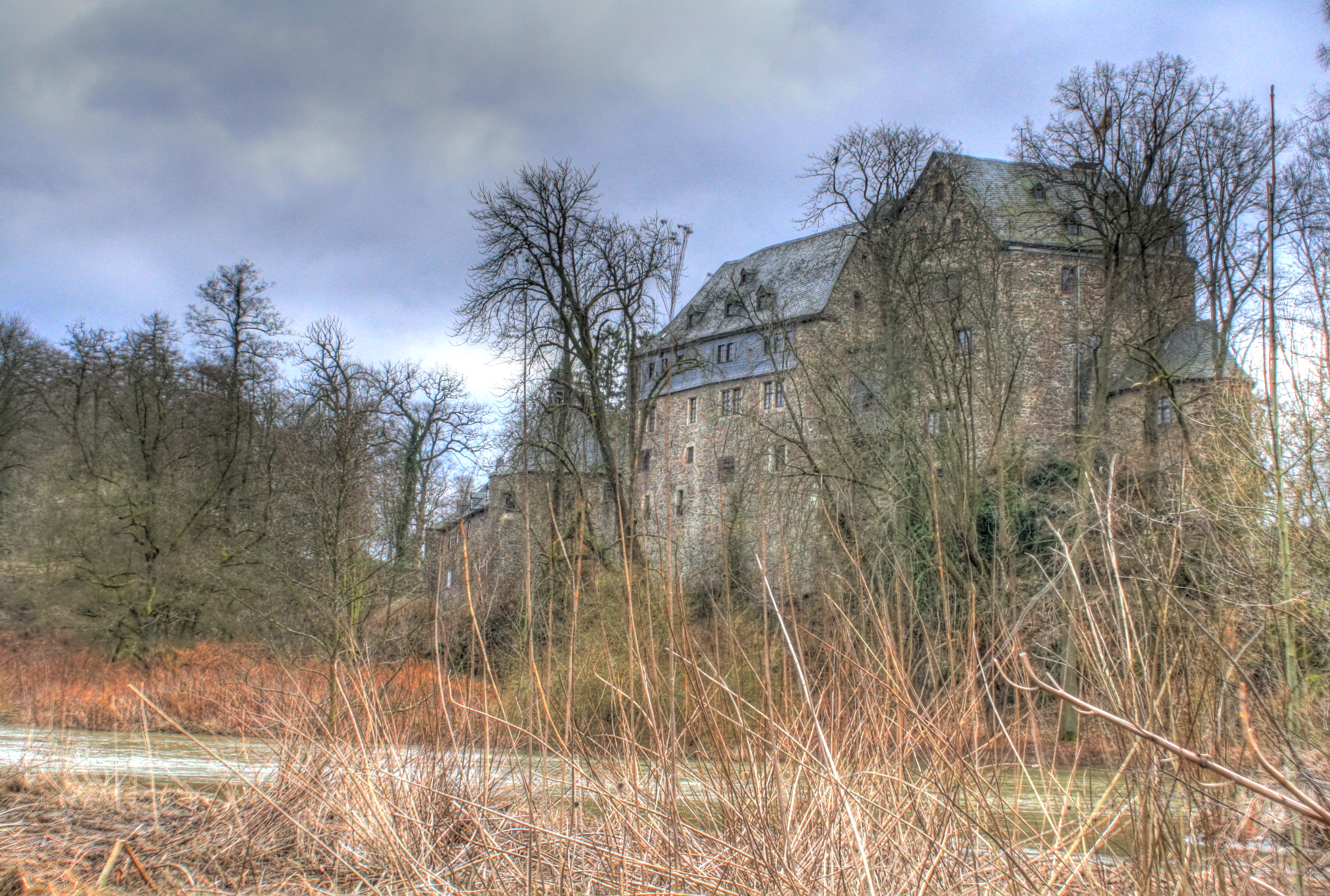
Schönstein Castle near Wissen (since 1589 owned by the family)

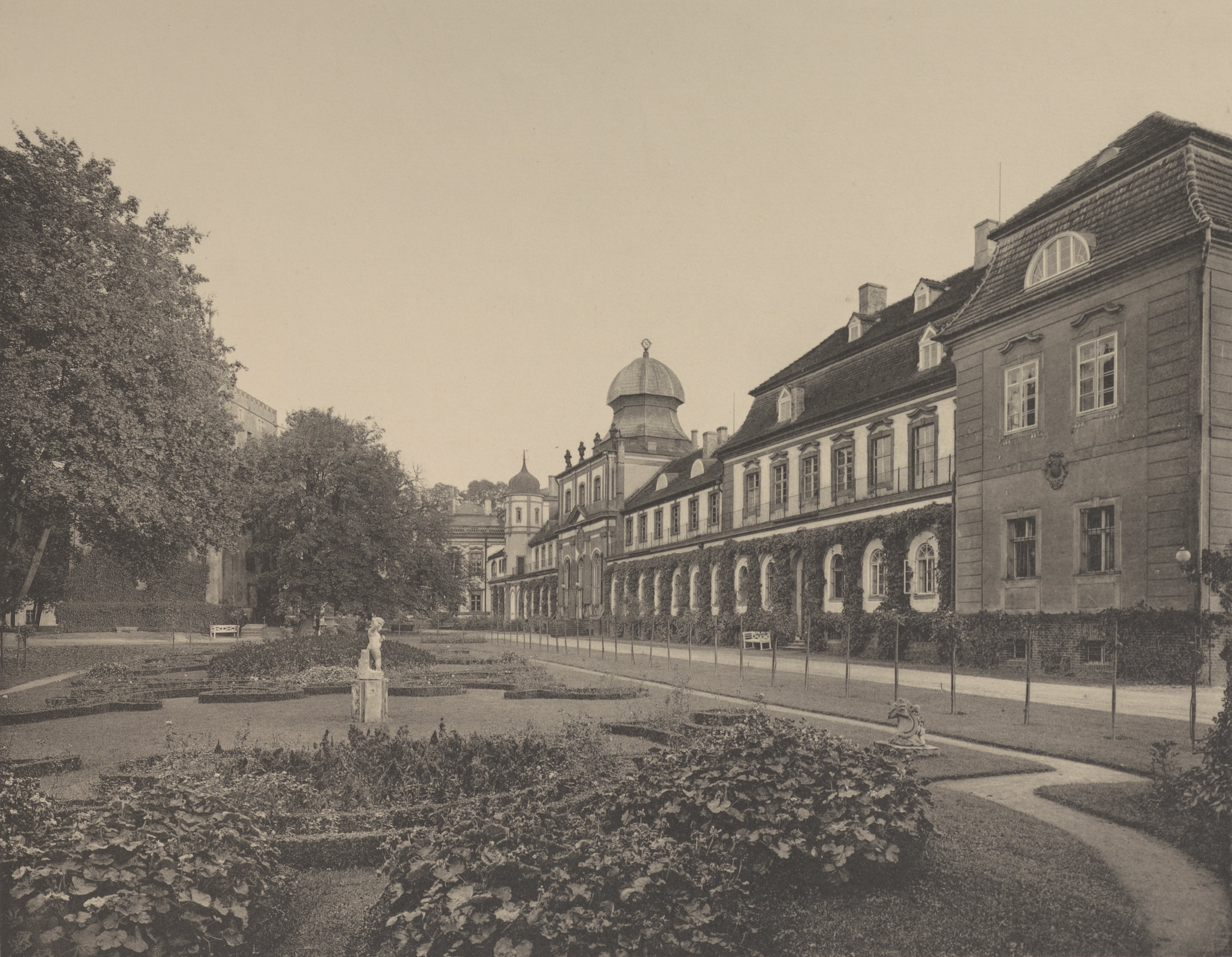
Trachenberg Castle, Silesia (today Żmigród, Poland, 1641-1945 owned by the family)

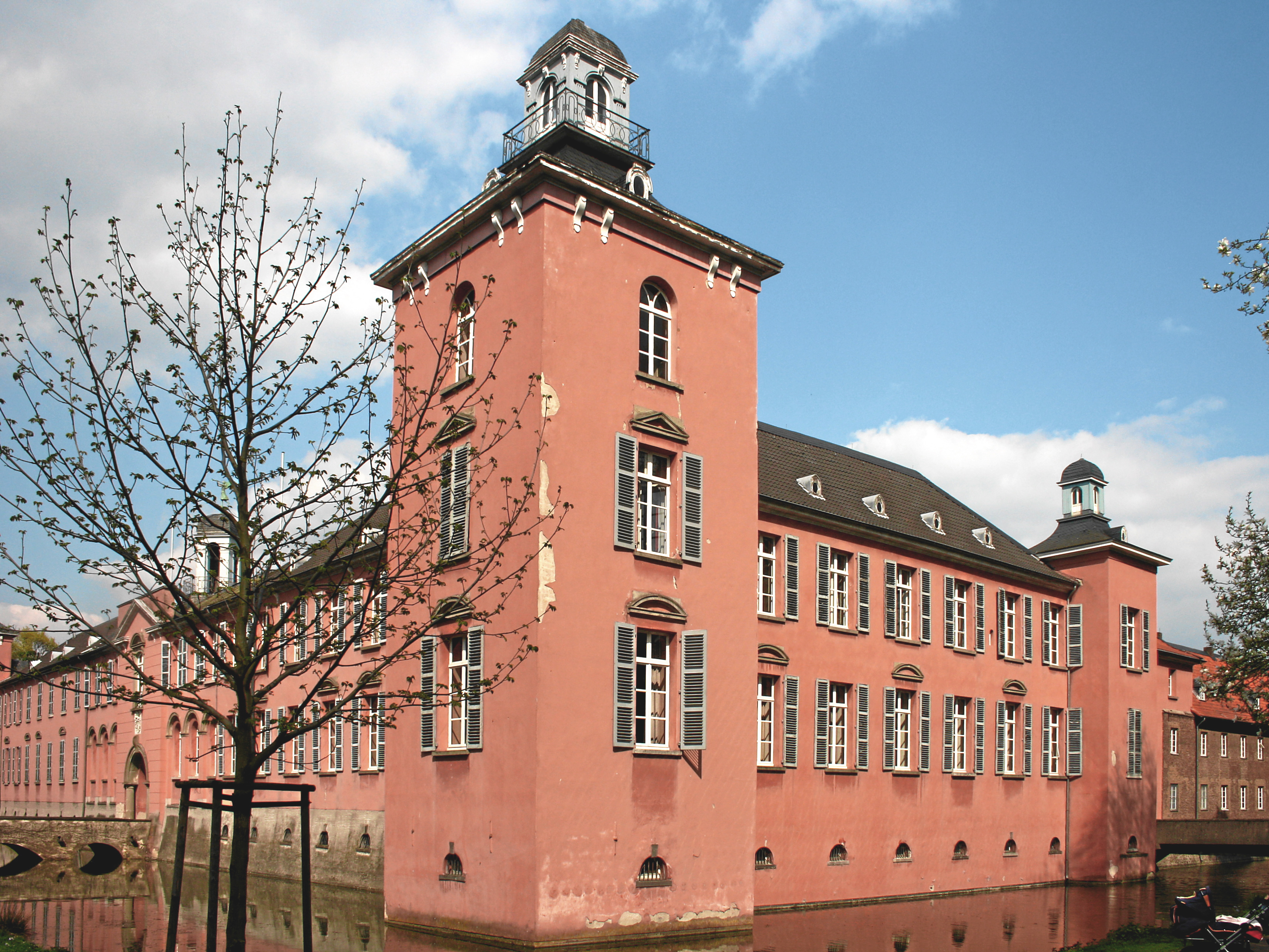
Kalkum Castle near Düsseldorf (early 18th century until 1946)

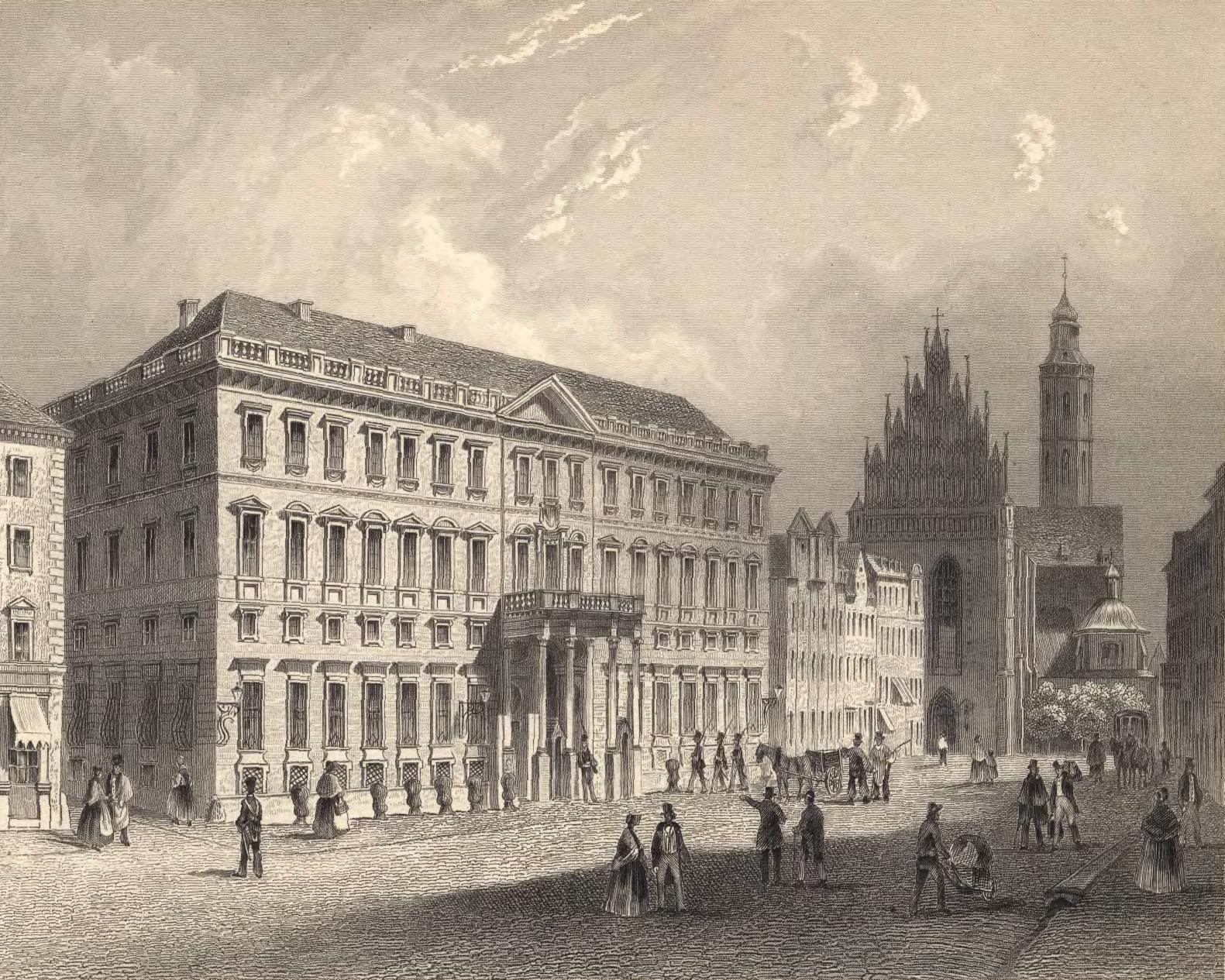
Wrocław (Breslau) Palais Hatzfeld (1765)

== See also ==
- House of Castellane
