= 1906 Grand National =

English steeplechase horse race

- Grand National
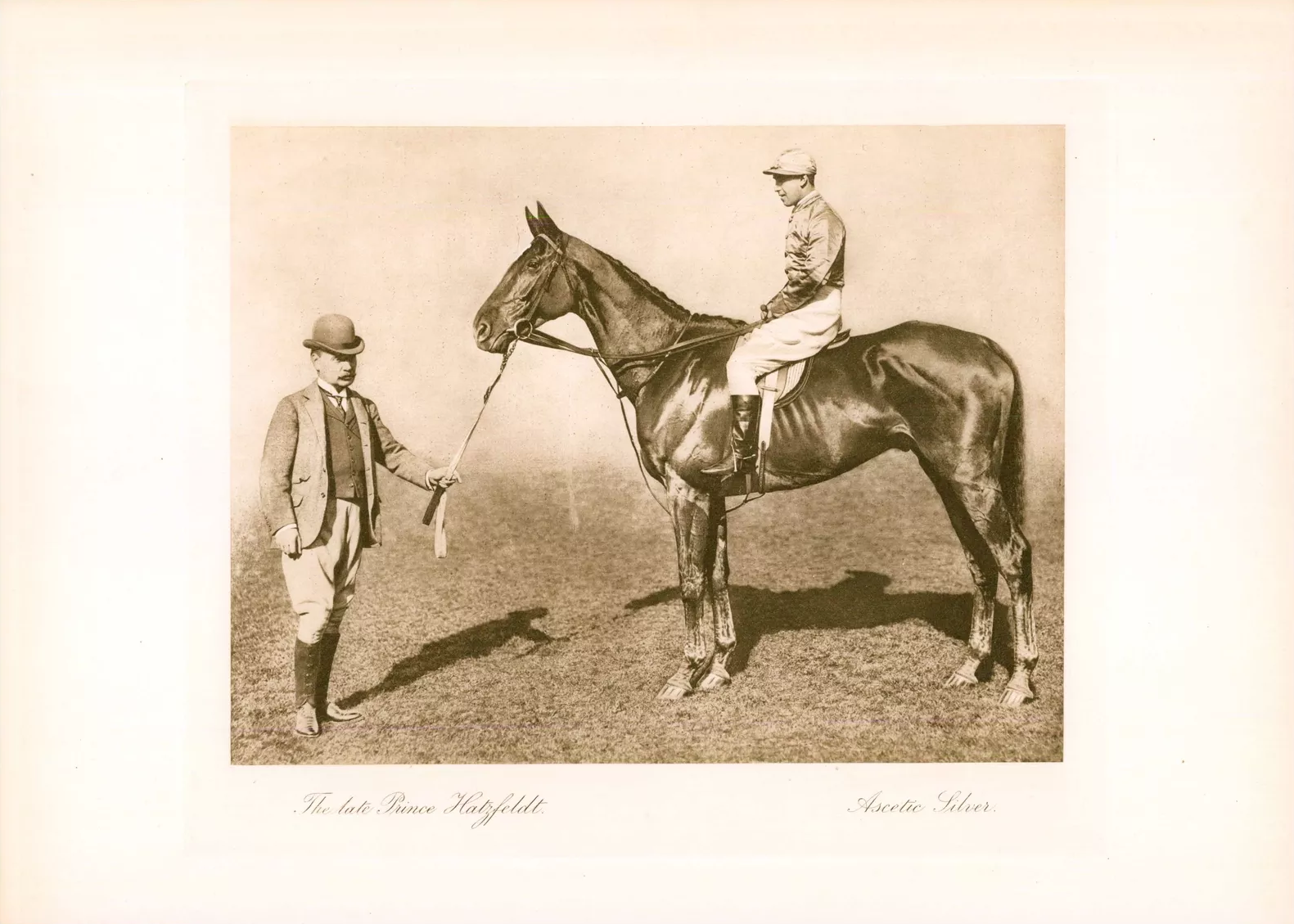
- Ascetic's Silver and Franz von Hatzfeldt-Wildenburg
- Location: Aintree
- Date: 30 March 1906
- Winning horse: Ascetic's Silver
- Starting price: 20/1
- Jockey: Mr Aubrey Hastings
- Trainer: Aubrey Hastings
- Owner: (German Empire) Prince Franz von Hatzfeldt
- Conditions: Good to firm

The 1906 Grand National was the 68th renewal of the Grand National horse race that took place at Aintree near Liverpool, England, on 30 March 1906.

== Finishing Order ==
Position	Name	Jockey	Age	Handicap (st-lb)	SP	Distance
01	Ascetic's Silver	Aubrey Hastings	9	10-9	20/1	10 Lengths
02	Red Lad	Charles Kelly	6	10-2	33/1	
03	Aunt May	Mr H Perse	?	11-2	25/1	
04	Crautacaun	Ivor Anthony	?	10-6	100/6	
05	Wolf's Folly	Thomas Fitton	?	10-6	100/6	
06	Oatlands	Harry Aylin	6	9-13	100/6	
07	Gladiator	Edmund Driscoll	6	9-9	100/6	
08	Drumcree	Walter Bulteel	?	12-2	33/1	
09	Phil May	J Owens	7	11-5	9/1	Last to complete

== Non-finishers ==
Fence	Name	Jockey	Age	Handicap (st-lb)	SP	Fate
02	Dathi	Arthur Birch	?	10-4	25/1	Fell
06	Hard To Find	E R Morgan	6	9-7	66/1	Fell
06	Canter Home	A Aylin	?	9-13	66/1	Fell
06	St Boswells	D Phelan	?	9-7	66/1	Fell
08	John M.P.	W Taylor	?	11-10	7/2	Fell
08	Kiora	G Clancy	?	10-4	33/1	Knocked Over
08	Comfit	Frank Mason	?	11-0	10/1	?
08	Roman Law	John Walsh Jnr	?	11-5	100/7	Knocked Over
16	Deerslayer	Percy Whitaker	?	10-4	50/1	Pulled Up
17	Glenrex	Mr R Walker	6	9-9	100/1	Fell
24	Timothy Titus	E Morgan	?	11-12	10/1	Fell
27	Buckaway II	Alfred Newey	?	10-4	20/1	Fell
?	Hill of Bree	Bob Chadwick	?	10-3	66/1	Knocked Over
?	Pierre	Joe Dillon	?	9-7	33/1	Pulled Up
