= Pose (disambiguation) =

A pose refers to a position of a human body.

Pose or poses or variant, may also refer to:

- to role-play, to pose as a role

== People ==
- Pose (artist) (born 1980, as Jordan Nickel), American artist
- Andrés Rodríguez-Pose, Spanish-British professor
- Eduard Wilhelm Pose (1812–1878), German painter
- Heinz Pose (1905–1975), German physicist
- Jörg Pose (born 1959), German actor
- Ludwig Pose (1786–1877), German painter
- Martin Pose (1911–1997), Argentinian golfer
- Martina Soto Pose, Argentine reporter
- Óscar Diego Gestido Pose (1901–1967), president of Uruguay
- Scott Pose (born 1967), U.S. baseball player
- Vanessa Pose (born 1990), Venezuelan actress

=== Fictional characters ===
- Tante Pose, the titular character from the eponymous Norwegian film Tante Pose

== Arts, entertainment, and media ==
=== Music ===
- Poses (album), Rufus Wainwright's second album, 2001
- "Pose" (Daddy Yankee song)
- "Pose" (Rihanna song)
- "Pose" (Yo Gotti song)
- “Pose” (Red Velvet song)
- "Pose", a song by Loona from Flip That
- "Pose", a song by Stefanie Scott and Carlon Jeffery from the A.N.T. Farm soundtrack
- "Pose", a song by Justin Timberlake from FutureSex/LoveSounds
- "Pose", a song by Jack & Jack from A Good Friend Is Nice
- "Poses", a song by Rufus Wainwright and title track off the eponymous 2001 album

=== Other uses in arts, entertainment, and media ===
- Pose (TV series), an American drama television series
- Pose (film), an upcoming thriller film
- a pose, a dance move in the waacking style of street dance
- a pose, a dance move in Vogue (dance)

== Computers and technology ==
- Pose (computer vision)
- Palm OS Emulator, abbreviated as POSE
- Proof of secure erasure (PoSE), a computer security protocol for clearing a device's memory

== Other uses ==
- Pose (dominoes), to set the first tile in a hand of dominoes
- Poses, Eure, France; a commune of the Eure department in France
- Pose refers to the orientation and conformation of a ligand during molecular docking

== See also ==
- Pose to pose animation
- Strike a pose (disambiguation)
- Poser (disambiguation)
- Posing (disambiguation)
- Poise (disambiguation)
- Posies (disambiguation)
