= Kalkum Castle =

Water castle in Düsseldorf, Germany

Coordinates: 51°18′15″N 6°45′26″E

Kalkum Castle is a water castle in the district of the same name in the north of Düsseldorf about two kilometers northeast of Kaiserswerth and an extraordinary example of Classicism in the Rhineland. Together with the associated castle park, it has been a listed building since January 1984.

Originating from one of the oldest knights' seats in the region, the ancestral seat of the knightly-born lords von Kalkum, the property passed to the lords von Winkelhausen around the middle of the 15th century, who were to determine the fate of the estate for the following 300 years. Modified in the 17th century into a castle in the Baroque style, the complex was given its current external appearance mainly through a classicist conversion between 1808 and 1814 based on designs by the Krefeld master builder Georg Peter Leydel. He connected the outer bailey and the manor house by inserting intermediate buildings to form a closed four-winged complex. At the same time, under the direction of landscape architect Maximilian Friedrich Weyhe, a palace park was laid out in the English landscape style. In 1817, the main gate was extended by the architect Johann Peter Cremer. The interior of the palace was designed by the decorative painter Ludwig Pose.

Kalkum became known far beyond the borders of Prussia as a result of the divorce war between the castle owner Count Edmund von Hatzfeldt and his wife Sophie, who was represented by Ferdinand Lassalle, who was only 20 years old at the time. Today, a memorial in a tower-like pavilion on the eastern wall of the palace park commemorates him. After the World War II, the buildings were initially used as refugee accommodation, then as a training center for home workers. The complex was then restored from 1954 to 1966 and converted for use as an archive. In the process, the classicist living and social rooms of the manor house were restored.

Today, the palace is empty because the Branch of the State Archives of North Rhine-Westphalia, which was housed there for a long time, moved to the new Landesarchiv building in Duisburg at the end of 2014. However, the facility is still used for classical concerts and other cultural events. The approximately 19 hectare large palace park is open to the public.

== History ==
=== Beginnings and the Kalkum feud ===
According to the Rhyming chronicle created by Eberhard von Gandersheim from 1216 to 1218, a royal court existed in Kalkhem as early as 892, which the later Kaiser Arnolf of Carinthia gave to Gandersheim Abbey in that year: "Noch gaf de könnich to Gandersem einen riken hof, de is geheten Kalkhem; unde sin bi deme Rine belegen." However, Kalkum was not first mentioned in a document as Calechheim until 947, when Emperor Otto the Great confirmed this donation. However, the Gandersheim estate was not a predecessor of the present-day castle, but probably the present-day Niederhof in the part of Kalkum called Unterdorf. In 1176, the lords of Kalkum were first mentioned in a document with the lower nobleman Willelmus de Calecheim, a ministerial of the Merbey of Meer. They were the owners of a knight's seat in Kalkum. Members of the family later also called themselves von Calichem, Caylchem, Calgheim and von Calcum. The knights' seat was a first fixed house in the part of Kalkum called Oberdorf, which has not yet been dated or located more precisely, but was probably on the site of today's castle. From the 14th century onwards, the lords of Kalkum were in the service of the Berg counts and later dukes. In 1360, Peter von Kalkum held the office of Berg court master and was ducal Landdrost from 1361 to 1383.

By the 14th century, the Kalkum knight's seat had developed into a castle-like complex, probably consisting of a manor house and an outer bailey separated from it by a moat. According to earlier tradition, this complex was besieged and destroyed by Cologne troops in 1405, as members of the family of the Lords of Kalkum were in feud with the city of Cologne from the end of the 14th to the beginning of the 15th century, which went down in Rhenish history as the Kalkum Feud. However, contemporary chronicles of the associated warlike actions only mention the destruction of the house of Arnold von Kalkum (heren Arnols huyss) and not explicitly the castle in Kalkum. More recent research suggests that the house that burned down was not the Kalkum castle, but Haus Remberg, located south of Duisburg.

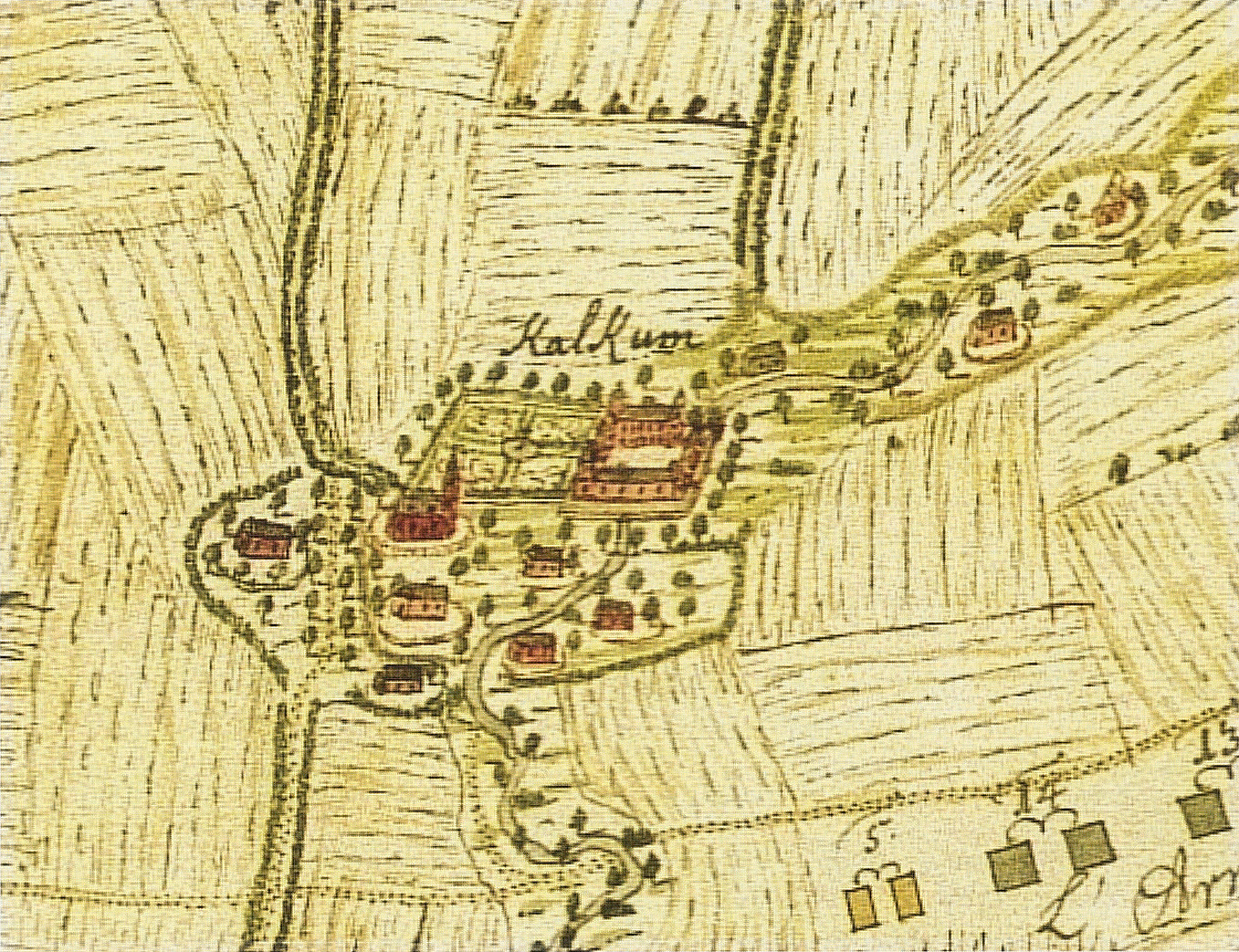
Depiction of the castle on a war map from 1702

=== Kalkum under the von Winkelhausen family ===
The lords of Kalkum rebuilt their burnt-down manor house after the end of the feud. A map from around 1600 shows it as an ensemble of three houses connected by corridor-like buildings, which were surrounded on all sides by a common moat. However, the estate did not remain in the possession of the lords of Kalkum for much longer, as the line of Kalkum died around the middle of the 15th century. Around the middle of the 15th century, the male line of the family based in Kalkum died out and the castle was inherited by the von Winkelhausen family, whose ancestral seat, the Haus Winkelhausen, was located a few kilometers north of Kalkum. It is still not clear exactly when this happened. There is documentary evidence that Grete von Kalkum gave her estates in parish Kalkum to Hermann von Winkelhausen in 1443. This could also have included the Kalkum house. There is evidence that the castle was owned by Winkelhausen in 1465, as in that year Herrmann von Winkelhausen designated Kalkum as a widow's residence for his wife Agnes on 27 October. In the 17th century, the estate was also used several times to provide for widowed members of the family. After inheriting the estate in the 15th century, the von Winkelhausen family moved their permanent residence to Kalkum. Around 1500, the owner was Johann von Winkelhausen. The estate passed from him to his son Ludger and finally to his nephew of the same name in 1556. This Ludger von Winkelhausen was jülich-Berg councillor, equerry and marshal as well as bailiff of Hückeswagen, Bornefeld and Mettmann. In 1553, his family was also elevated to the baronial rank by privilege of Emperor Ferdinand III.

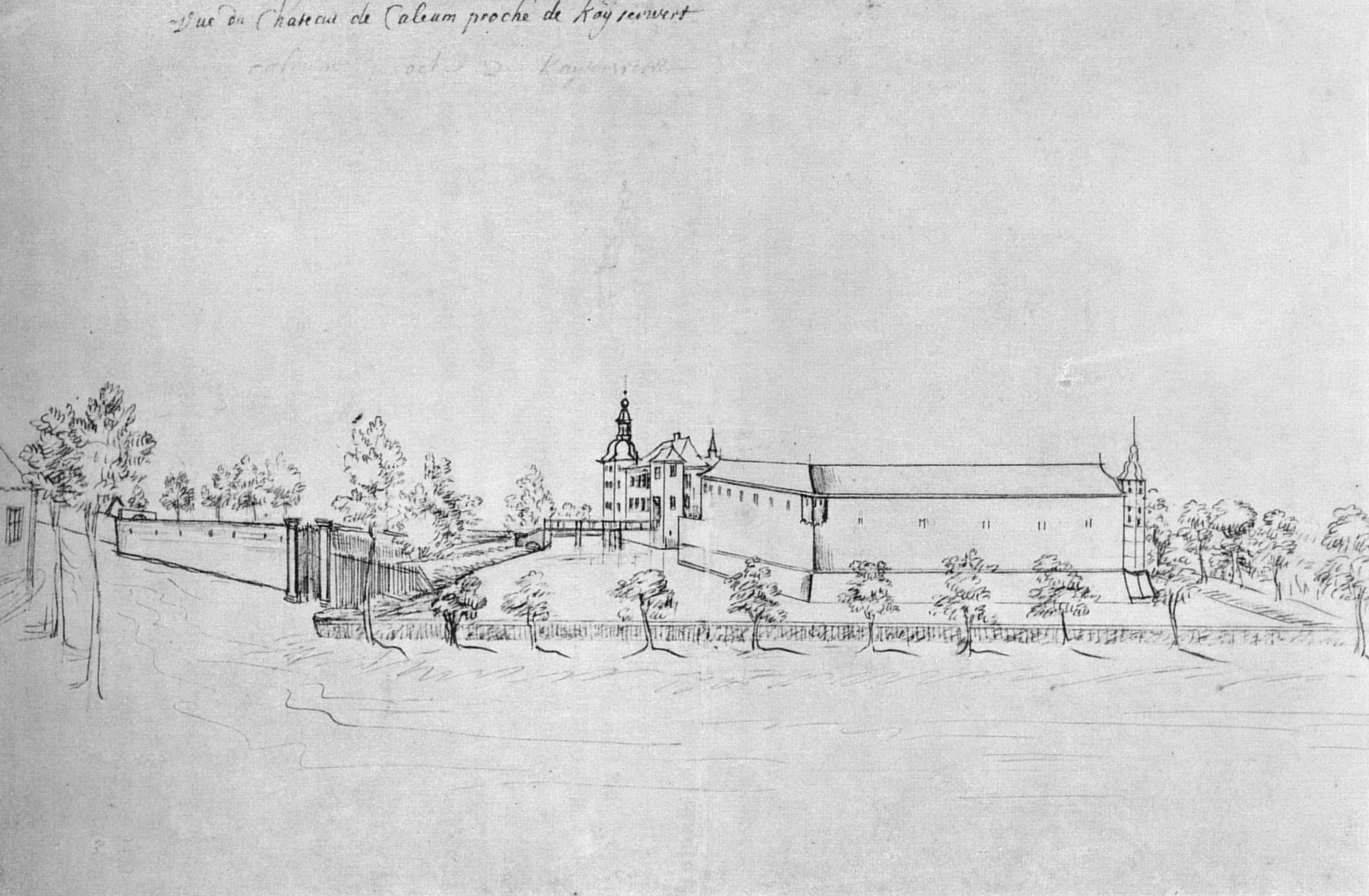
Kalkum Castle in a drawing by Renier Roidkin from 1720/1730

Ludger had the old Gothic Wasserburg into a representative Baroque castle by 1663, partly using the old building fabric. The stately residence at the south-west corner of the complex, known as the Oberhaus was not only given large rectangular windows and a new roof, but a square corner tower with a curved hood and lantern was also added to its two wings, which abutted at right angles. However, the main focus of the work was on enlarging the outer bailey buildings. Ludger had the old farm buildings completely demolished and then had a new four-winged outer bailey built, which was more than twice as large as its predecessor. Together with the manor house, the castle now had the quadrangular ground plan it still has today and was surrounded by a newly dug moat. A drawing by the Walloon Renier Roidkin from around 1720/1730 shows Kalkum Castle after the conversion and extension work. The building stock at that time included a castle chapel to the north of the two-storey manor house. A ridge turret depicted on the Roidkin drawing points to this building, which no longer exists. In addition, a stone foundation found in the corresponding place suggests an altar. At the north-east corner of the outer bailey stood a polygonal corner tower with a double-curved Baroque dome, which is no longer preserved today. A wooden bridge led over the southern moat to a square tower with a gate.

After the death of Ludger von Winkelhausen in 1679, his son Philipp Wilhelm took over the inheritance. During his time as lord of the castle, Kalkum was almost constantly involved in warfare due to its proximity to the heavily fortified Kaiserswerth was almost constantly involved in warfare. In the course of the Palatinate and the subsequent Spanish War of Succession, the complex was severely damaged. In 1688, soldiers of the Sun King Louis XIV occupied Kaiserswerth. The French Minister of War Louvois demanded that Philipp Wilhelm defortify his property by filling in the castle moat and taking down all the defensive walls. When these demands were not immediately met, French troops occupied the complex and devastated it. Their stay at Kalkum did not last long, however, as the German imperial princes had joined forces to expel the French from the Lower Rhine. The French soldiers eventually had to vacate the castle and flee from the approaching allied troops from Brandenburg, Münster and Holland, some of whom then took up quarters in the castle themselves. The change of occupation was accompanied by constant bombardment of the castle, which caused considerable damage to the walls and roofs. The quartering of the soldiers - Lieutenant Colonel von Kalkstein from the Brandenburg regiment alone came with 40 horses and 200 foot soldiers - also affected the fabric of the building. Despite the uncertainties, the von Winkelhausen family continued to live at Kalkum Castle during this time. Kalkum was also involved in the fighting during the War of the Spanish Succession, during which Kaiserswerth was again taken by French troops at the end of November 1701 and besieged and recaptured in 1702 by allied imperial troops from Holland and Prussia under the leadership of Elector Johann Wilhelm II. Soldiers again took up quarters in the castle. This time the buildings were not damaged by military action, but gardens, fields and meadows were devastated by entrenchments and could no longer be cultivated. In addition, the occupying forces had taken away or destroyed numerous pieces of equipment and furniture from the castle.

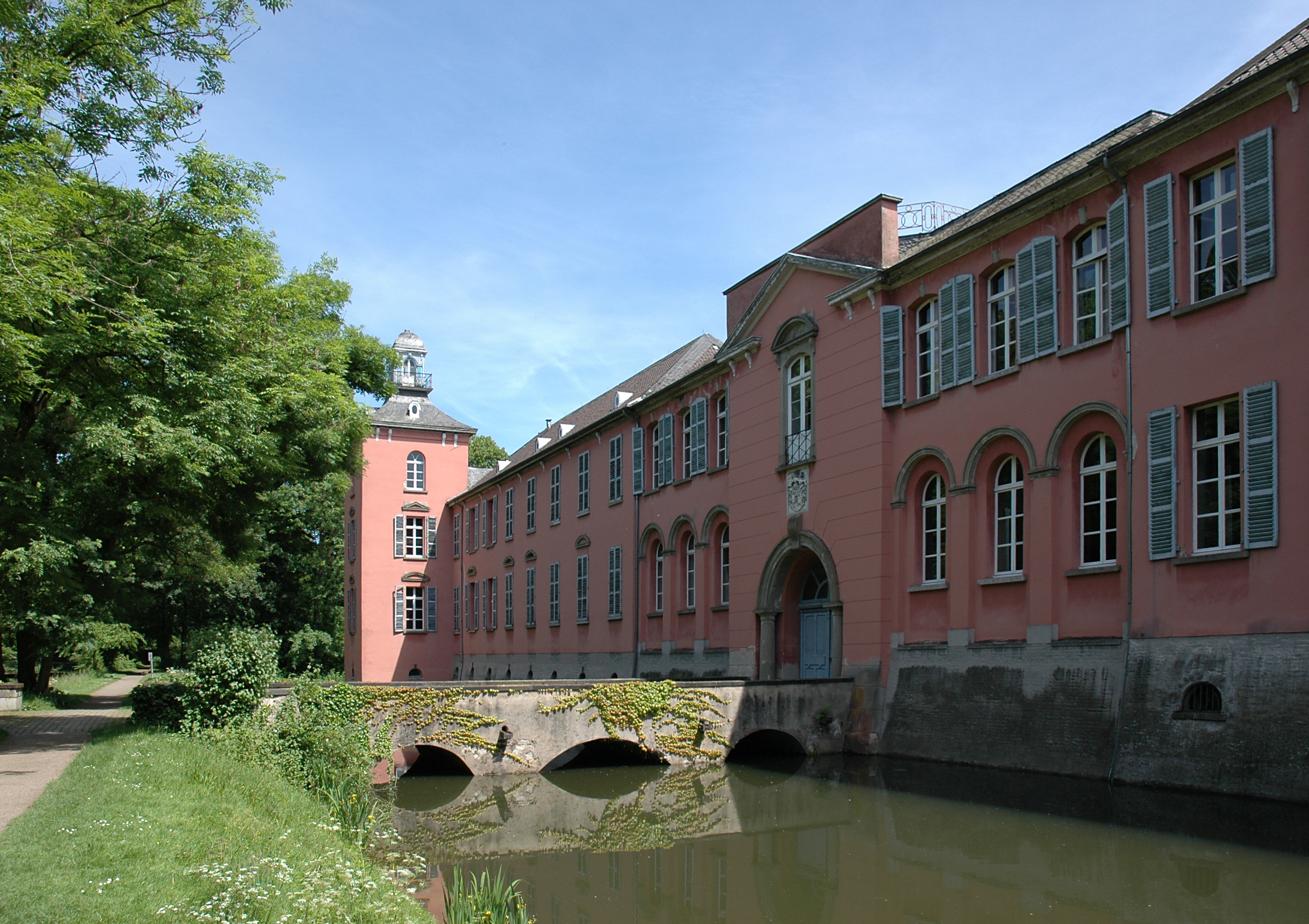
The symmetrically designed representative façade of the west wing (2014)

=== Transfer to the von Hatzfeldt family and renewed quartering ===
The von Winkelhausen family was raised to the Imperial Count rank by Elector Johann Wilhelm in his capacity as Imperial Vicar on behalf of the Emperor on 2 October 1711. Philipp Wilhelm's son from his marriage to Anna Maria von Hompesch, Count Franz Carl, died in 1737. When his only son Karl Philipp also died shortly afterwards in 1739, the Kalkum line of the Counts of Winkelhausen became extinct in the male line. Philipp Wilhelm's daughter Isabella Johanna Maria Anna, who had married Edmund Florenz von Hatzfeldt-Wildenburg-Weisweiler Castle on 17 November 1703, became the sole heir to the estate. Through her, the castle passed to her husband's family. However, she not only inherited the castle, but also the associated debts of 77,000 Reichstalern. Through clever management, the family managed to restore a stable financial situation. Initially, however, the von Hatzfeldts rarely stayed in Kalkum. The estate was only occupied by a Rentmeister and the tenant of the agricultural land belonging to the castle. A head forester managed the extensive forest estate. Because the manor house was mostly uninhabited, its structural condition deteriorated visibly. This was aggravated by renewed quartering of soldiers during the Austrian War of Succession and the Seven Years' War. From 1741 to 1742, it was used by French soldiers under Marshal Jean-Baptiste Desmarets. During the Seven Years' War, it was initially the French again who set up camp at Kalkum Castle until 19 April 1758. They were followed in June by Hanoverian troops under General von Wangen, who were relieved by soldiers of the allies before a French regiment seized the castle again for its own purposes in November. The French marshal Charles de Rohan, Prince of Soubise, did not even issue an exemption certificate for the castle to prevent its quartering. He was simply ignored. The changing quartering ceased at the end of the Seven Years' War, but by then the fabric of the building had suffered greatly. Major alterations were made to the farm buildings between 1747 and 1755, including the extension of the stables and the creation of a tack room. In 1778, the lord of the castle considered enlarging the residential building, but this plan was not realized.

=== Conversion to a classicist castle ===
It was not until the beginning of the 19th century that Kalkum Castle was to be used as a permanent residence again. In 1806, Maria Anna von Kortenbach, the widow of the recently deceased Jülich land marshal Edmund Gottfried von Hatzfeldt (1740–1806), came to Kalkum to use the castle as a widow's residence. Maria Anna was joined by her daughter-in-law Frederike Maria Hubertine von Hersell (1758–1833), who was widowed in 1799, and her grandson Count Edmund von Hatzfeld, born in 1798. However, as they found the castle uninhabitable, they temporarily moved to Kinzweiler before taking up residence in the tenant's apartment at Kalkum Castle in the fall. They spent the following winter of 1806/07 at the Hof von Holland in Düsseldorf and moved back to Kalkum Castle in the spring, this time to a small room in the tenant's apartment. The widow soon realized that extensive building work would be needed to be able to use Kalkum as a residence in the future. In July 1805, her deceased husband had turned down the offer of a Swedish Obrist, who was looking for a suitable country residence, to lease Kalkum Castle and restore it to a habitable condition. Maria Anna engaged the Krefeld master builder Georg Peter Leydel to convert the run-down Baroque castle into a spacious residence in the style of Classicism. Leydel left almost all of the interior buildings unchanged, but made the exterior of the complex symmetrical. He removed the separation between the manor house and outer bailey by filling in the dividing moat and closing the gaps with intermediate buildings. In addition, the western part of the outer bailey was demolished and replaced by a copy of the Baroque manor house. The relocation of the main driveway from the north to the west side completed Leydel's conversion plans.

Repairs to the outer bailey in 1808 marked the start of the subsequent six years of construction work on the castle, which Leydel had initially calculated would only take four years. From November 1809, the manor house underwent only relatively minor exterior alterations: ceilings and roofs as well as the mural crown were repaired and the building was extended from six to eight window axes on the west front. A newly erected, low central building with a portal connected the manor house with its recently built counterpart at the northwest corner of the complex. Like the original, this counterpart to the manor house had two wings; the western wing had been completely rebuilt following the demolition of the outer bailey wing there, while the northern wing, later called the Rentei and Domestics Wing, consisted of the former Halfe house, which was extended by one storey to three storeys in 1812/1813 and thus to the height of the west wing. The north-western corner tower - at the same time as the tower at the north entrance - had already been taken down and rebuilt in 1811. The completion of the central portal building in the same year gave Kalkum Castle a symmetrically designed, representative frontage. The western part of the previous outer bailey wing to the south was demolished in September 1810 and the gap there was closed by the so-called kitchen building, a two-storey intermediate building with three window axes. Its height was initially determined by the adjoining stable to the east. After all the work on the outer bailey had been completed, it was painted a light ochre color, while the white exterior color of the rest of the castle was not changed. From 1810, craftsmen were busy redesigning the interior of the manor house in the strict Empire style. Little remains of this initial decoration of the living rooms with elaborate stuccoatures, valuable wallpapers and magnificent wall paintings due to later redesigns. Engelbert Selb from Krefeld was responsible for the stucco work. The wallpaper was supplied by the upholsterer J. G. Lentzen from Aachen. The work he carried out in November 1811 not only used paper wallpaper, but also some very expensive fabrics, for example in the so-called tower room, which has a wall covering made of Chinese silk. The murals were painted by the Düsseldorf decorative painter Ludwig Pose, who later also worked at Jägerhof Palace and Rheinstein Castle. In April 1813, the manor house was completed to such an extent that the von Hatzfeldt family could move into it. Only a few months later, at the beginning of 1814, there were Russian quarters in the castle for a few months after they had driven out the French soldiers previously stationed there.

In the meantime, there had been a dispute between the countess and her master builder and the two went their separate ways. From 1815, Leydel no longer appeared in the count's building accounts, although the palace conversion was still unfinished at the time. To make matters worse, Leydel had never submitted plans for the conversion, so Maria Anna von Kortenbach had to have new designs drawn up for the further construction. This took into account the fact that the previous design was too plain and not representative enough for the lady of the castle. The first minor reconstruction took place in 1817, when a risalit was added to the west portal according to plans by Johann Peter Cremer, who shortly afterwards designed the Aachen City Theater and was a close collaborator of Adolph von Vagedes. In 1819, the lady of the palace commissioned August Reinking, who had previously worked at Oberhausen Palace, to draw up a proposal for the transformation of Leydel's plain central building in the west wing into a stately Corps de Logis. He envisaged adding a storey to the building and deepening it on the inner courtyard side. The flat roof was to be crowned by a dome and hidden behind a broad balustrade. Reinking also planned to remove the third storey of the two corner towers and replace it with a low mezzanine storey to take away the dominance of the towers on the west façade. However, Reinking's unexpected death just a few months after he had submitted the designs thwarted the implementation of the plan. Countess Maria Anna was forced to go in search of an architect again and chose Friedrich Weinbrenner from Karlsruhe as her successor. Weinbrenner was in Düsseldorf at the time because he was working on plans for the new Düsseldorf theater. In 1820, he also presented the countess with a design for the redesign of the western palace façade; however, as Weinbrenner's plans for the new Düsseldorf theater failed, he returned to his home town, and so his plan for Kalkum also remained unrealized.

Another architect had been working on the palace since 1818: Anton Schnitzler, a student of Vagedes. According to his plans, the kitchen building in the south wing was extensively altered in 1821. He added a second, low upper floor to the building in order to bring its height into line with the adjoining manor house to the west. From then on, the new floor served as servants' accommodation. The design of the exterior façade was also changed with a flat projecting central risalit and new windows. Schnitzler used a trick here: in order to adapt the façade of the three kitchen floors to the two-storey manor house, the lower row of high arched windows not only illuminated the first floor, but also the low mezzanine floor above. The south entrance was probably also moved from the flanking square tower to the kitchen wing in the course of this conversion work. Around the same time, houses for the castle servants were built on the southern edge of the castle park around 1820. Until the 1820s, the northern west wing of the palace and the upper floor of the Rentei and Domestics Wing were only completed in the shell. The interior work has now begun. The reason for this was a lack of space caused by the birth of several children in the Hatzfeldt family. On 10 August 1822 Maria Anna's grandson Edmund married 17-year-old Sophie von Hatzfeldt-Schönstein, who was related to him, in the chapel of Allner Castle. Two days after the marriage, the family hosted a lavish wedding for the couple at Kalkum Castle, where the two newlyweds subsequently lived. The billiard room was completely overhauled especially for this celebration. In the days following the celebration, numerous windows in the castle had to be replaced because they had been broken during the evening fireworks display at the event.

Until 1833, a slender square tower with a double-curved baroque dome stood at the north-east corner, which served as a pigeon tower. It was demolished that year and the resulting gap was closed by a wall. In September of the same year, Countess Maria Anna von Kortenbach died. Her grandson Edmund succeeded her as owner of the castle. In 1836, he engaged the Essen city architect Heinrich Theodor Freyse as the leading architect for a redesign of the rooms in the manor house. Under him, who had previously been responsible for the new construction of Heltorf Palace, the so-called state rooms were created from 1837. These living and public rooms were given an elaborate late classicist décor according to Freyse's plans by 1841. In Ludwig Pose and the upholsterer Lentzen, two of the experts who had already been responsible for some of the interior decoration under Leydel were called in. The stucco work was carried out by the Cologne master plasterer Lenhardt and his journeyman Moosbrugger. The sculptural decoration came from the workshop of the Düsseldorf sculptor Dietrich Mein(h)ardus. In 1841/42, the work was completed when the west wing of the palace and the other fronts of the manor house and the Rentei wing were given a new plaster, which was painted light pink according to Freyse's suggestion.

At the same time as the renovation work began in 1808, Countess Maria Anna had a new palace park laid out in the English landscape style. The plans were drawn up by Maximilian Friedrich Weyhe, who coordinated them with Georg Peter Leydel's building project. It was probably even Leydel on whose recommendation Weyhe received the commission. There was already a small park from the Baroque period to the west of the palace, which was to be redesigned and enlarged. In order to be able to carry out the extension, land to the west of the castle was acquired in exchange. On 18 November 1807, Maximilian Friedrich Weyhe visited Kalkum for the first time to gain an impression of the site and carry out a survey. On 26 January, he delivered his plans for the conversion and redesign of Kalkum Park to the lady of the castle, although the originals are no longer preserved today. The Düsseldorf court gardener oversaw the garden work in Kalkum until 1819 (in which year the layout was essentially completed), whereby the original plan was repeatedly supplemented with new elements in the course of implementation, so that the work continued until 1825. Under Weyhe's direction, not only was a new landscape garden created, but also kitchen gardens, a park pond and a riding arena to the north of the palace. Together with Leydel, he established the final boundaries of the English garden on 12 June 1809 and from then on visited Kalkum once a month until 1819 to inspect the progress of the work. By 1818, 7572 trees and shrubs had been delivered to Kalkum for the design of the gardens and park. Weyhe had the Schwarzbach, which still feeds the castle forces today, canalized so that it flows in a straight line from south to north on the west side. Between November 1812 and May 1813, he used the excavated material from the pond north of the castle grounds to raise a mound on the northern edge of the landscaped garden, on which a small temple in the tradition of Chinoiserie was built by 1818. In the following year, a shooting range was laid out in the south-western area of the park and at the same time the renovation of the nearby ice cellar. South of the palace buildings, at the level of the manor wing in front of the water garden, there was an older formal garden, traditionally designed with a crossroads, which Weyhe converted into a kitchen garden. The part of the ditch bordering this garden was filled-in in 1825 and the area thus gained was added to the south garden. In 1835, a luxurious greenhouse called the flower house was built on this area on the south side of the southwest tower according to Weyhe's plans. In addition, a orangery over 20 meters long was built in the eastern area, leaning against the southern outer wall, and the so-called pineapple house was built parallel to it in the summer of 1838.

After work on the palace buildings was completed and the gardens finished, the palace was only rarely used as a residence by the Hatzfeldt family. They mostly stayed in Düsseldorf. The farm and the pig and cattle stables had already been abandoned by 1840. Kalkum served almost exclusively as the seat of the Hatzfeldt head office, which was under the direction of a rentmaster. Nevertheless, the estate once again came to the public's attention during the 19th century when Countess Sophie von Hatzfeldt separated from her husband Edmund in 1846. Their marriage had been entered into in 1822 for purely family-political reasons and was not a happy union. The affair degenerated into a veritable divorce war and was fought bitterly by both sides. The countess was represented by the young Ferdinand Lassalle as her lawyer. The divorce proceedings were conducted before six courts, before the parties agreed in a settlement in 1854 that Sophie von Hatzfeldt would receive her allods back and thus become financially independent.

=== Changing uses and decline ===
Under Edmund and Sophie's son Alfred and his wife Gabriele von Dietrichstein-Proskau-Leslie, some more minor construction work was carried out in the palace in the second half of the 19th century, for example the installation of several porcelain ovens in 1867. Shortly afterwards, around 1870 changes were made to the interior decoration, as a result of which the classicist furnishings were lost in all the living rooms with the exception of the Music Hall. Nevertheless, Prince Alfred and his wife spent little time at Kalkum. Alfred, who had been elevated to the Prussian princely rank on 18 May 1870, was succeeded by his nephew Paul Hermann von Hatzfeldt in 1911. Under him, the castle was finally given up as a residence and in 1912 the Hatzfeldt manor house was moved to Crottorf, the main residence of Paul Hermann and his wife Maria von Stumm. The manor house was subsequently rented out, with the castle owners reserving only a few rooms for temporary stays in Kalkum. Tenants included the von Spee, von Stumm and von Benningsen families. As several families in the service of the prince kept their apartments in the castle alongside the rentmaster, the building and park continued to be well maintained. This did not change when a recruit depot was set up in the palace in 1915 during First World War and after the end of the war, first a Soldiers' Council, then Spartacists moved into the complex. From 1938 to 1945, the Painter Richard Gessner lived there. He captured his impressions of the complex in numerous paintings, which can be seen today in the Düsseldorf City Museum, among other places.

The hitherto good structural condition of the complex changed with the Second World War. To protect the nearby Düsseldorf Airport, an anti-aircraft tower was erected in the inner courtyard of the castle. Air defense crews and officers moved into the castle buildings, while anti-aircraft helpers were housed in a barrack built especially for them on the site of the riding track in the northern part of the park. Kalkum Castle did not receive any direct bomb hits during the war, but frequent impacts in the surrounding area caused massive static problems in the roof structure. The improper use as soldiers' accommodation and as storage space for Düsseldorf companies was also detrimental to the fabric of the building. In addition, the fragmentation effect of the anti-aircraft shells caused severe damage to the trees in the palace park, which gradually became overgrown due to the lack of manpower. After the end of the war, British occupying troops confiscated the grounds and converted the manor house into an officers' mess. In the process, they removed many of the valuable wallpapers for hygienic reasons and burned them. The British vacated the castle again in 1946.

=== Sale to North Rhine-Westphalia and conversion into an archive ===
After the British soldiers had left, the then owner Maria von Hatzfeldt offered the castle, including the park and surrounding agricultural land, to the newly founded state of North Rhine-Westphalia for 750,000 Reichsmark. The federal state accepted this offer. The corresponding purchase agreement, in which the lady of the castle reserved some rooms in the retirement wing for herself and her employees until 1951, is dated 15 November 1946. The state government confirmed this on 3 February 1947. on February 3, 1947, in order to set up an arts and crafts training and work center for war refugees in the castle buildings, as at the time of the sale, the complex served as accommodation for over 100 displaced persons at times. The model for the project was the Verein für Kunst- und Heimarbeitspflege Rheinland, which had been in existence for around ten years and aimed to train refugees and severely disabled people in arts and crafts work at home. Kalkum Castle was renovated for this purpose in 1948/1949, whereby the focus was not on monument protection but on making it usable for living and working purposes. The work, estimated at 20,000 Reichsmark, also included breaking out new windows. However, the refugee aid plan ultimately fell victim to the currency reform, and the associated activities were discontinued on 30 June 1950. Those responsible were now looking for a new use. Among the options under discussion were use as a retirement home for displaced persons, a domestic school, a police station and a state fire brigade school. This was not realized, nor were the plans to set up an administrative office or conference centre in the castle or to use the buildings as a hotel. During these numerous considerations and proposals, the neglected grounds fell into increasing disrepair. The manor house eventually even had to be evacuated because the roof truss was completely rotten due to damp and the Main State Archives were no longer strong enough. In 1952, a new perspective for use arose out of an emergency: notarial files from the Main State Archives, which had been moved toLinnep Castle and Gracht Castle due to the war, were to be returned to Düsseldorf and brought together. The space required for this was provided by the north and east wings of the Kalkum outer bailey, in which a temporary auxiliary storehouse was set up. This makeshift solution gave rise to the plan to use Kalkum Castle as a branch archive of the Main State Archives in the long term.

In order to meet the requirements of an archive, extensive refurbishment and restoration work on the buildings was necessary, which began in April 1954 under the leadership of the Düsseldorf State Building Department. In the first phase, which lasted until March 1955, the north and east wings were converted into a new storage area, garages were built and a heating system was installed. By August 1956, a second phase was completed to convert the southern outer bailey wing into three apartments and a special archive, for which the corresponding section of the building had to be completely gutted. A police apartment in the north wing was also converted. Steel structures in the interior provided support for the walls, which were no longer load-bearing. The castle was also given a new roof and the window openings that had only been broken out at the end of the 1940s were closed again. At the same time, the castle moat was cleared of mud in 1954, during which not only the foundations of the former pigeon tower were found, but also large quantities of live ammunition from both world wars. Not only the building fabric, but also the sewer system of the complex had to be renewed; during excavation work in the inner courtyard of the castle at the end of November 1954, foundation remains of Field fire bricks and trachyte blocks were found, which had been left over from the demolition work at the beginning of the 19th century. These were the foundation walls of two late medieval building phases, which archaeologically proved that the manor house of the Kalkum complex had always stood at today's south-west corner. However, these foundation remains remained chance finds; systematic excavations were not possible during the entire restoration work.

From October 1956 to mid-1960, the manor house was restored in a third construction phase, including the adjoining kitchen building, so that the administrative rooms of the archive could be accommodated on the upper floor. Unexpectedly, many remnants of the former neoclassical room decorations were found on the first floor of the manor house, so it was decided to restore the furnishings of the magnificent living rooms. The wall and ceiling paintings were reconstructed based on the remains of the original wallpaper and the remaining paintings. In a fourth construction phase lasting from November 1958 to December 1962, the Rentei und Domestikenflügel was extended and converted in order to install a five-storey compact storage facility. In the process, the previously three-storey northern façade of the building was brought into line with its two-storey western façade. Finally, the entire west façade, including the façades of the manor house and the Rentei and Domestikenflügel, was given a new pink lime Casein coat (Caput mortuum in lime and oil). The fifth and final construction phase included the design of the remaining exterior façades and the restoration of the palace park by Franz Josef Greub from 1962. The work ended in the fall of 1967, when the southern moat, which had been dredged again the previous year and fitted with a modern concrete bridge, was filled with water. The total costs of the 13-year restoration and conversion project came to 4. 675,000 DM. This had not yet been completed when the two archives of the Main State Archives began operations in 1962 with around 3400 m^{2} of storage space and 25 kilometers of shelving.

=== Kalkum Castle up to the present day ===
After the extensive work in the 1950s and 1960s, the castle saw only comparatively minor conservation measures. These included the renewal of the exterior paintwork between 1980 and 1981 and, in 1995, the re-excavation of a small park pond to the north of the Rentei und Domestikenflügel, which had previously been located there. In addition to the Rhineland Department of the State Archives, Kalkum Castle has also housed part of Vester's Archive, Institute for the History of Pharmacy since 1970, a collection founded in 1937 by pharmacist Helmut Vester . The part stored in Kalkum included a specialist library on the subject of pharmacy as well as pictures and maps of pharmacies and their history. In addition, there were around 400 display jars filled with raw drugs. In 1993, Vester's archive moved to Switzerland to the Pharmacy History Museum of the University of Basel.

The elaborately reconstructed neoclassical function rooms in the manor house are now used by the North Rhine-Westphalian Ministry of Culture for occasional receptions. The necessary catering rooms are located in the neighboring kitchen building. Art exhibitions are sometimes held there, and one of the Halls can be used for conferences. In the mid-2000s, a citizens' initiative campaigned to redesign the orangery in the south-eastern area of the palace park, which was only used as a storage room at the time, for cultural purposes and to offer young artists an event forum there. However, the plan was not realized.

The archive, which had long been housed in the palace, moved to the new location of the Landesarchiv in Duisburg at the end of 2014. The state of North Rhine-Westphalia then planned to sell the property for a single-digit million sum, whereby at least the Kalkum castle park would remain open to the public.

The palace was sold in March 2019 to project developer Peter Thunissen, who wanted to turn it into an academy for music and art with the help of architect David Chipperfield. To finance the renovation, he planned to convert the farmland to the west of the castle park into a residential area. However, these plans had to be abandoned after protests from citizens.

The state of North Rhine-Westphalia subsequently took legal action to have the invalidity of the purchase agreement declared by the courts. The buyer's counterclaim against this was finally dismissed by the Federal Court of Justice on 29 June 2023, with the rejection of the non-admission appeal.

== Description ==
Schematic floor plan

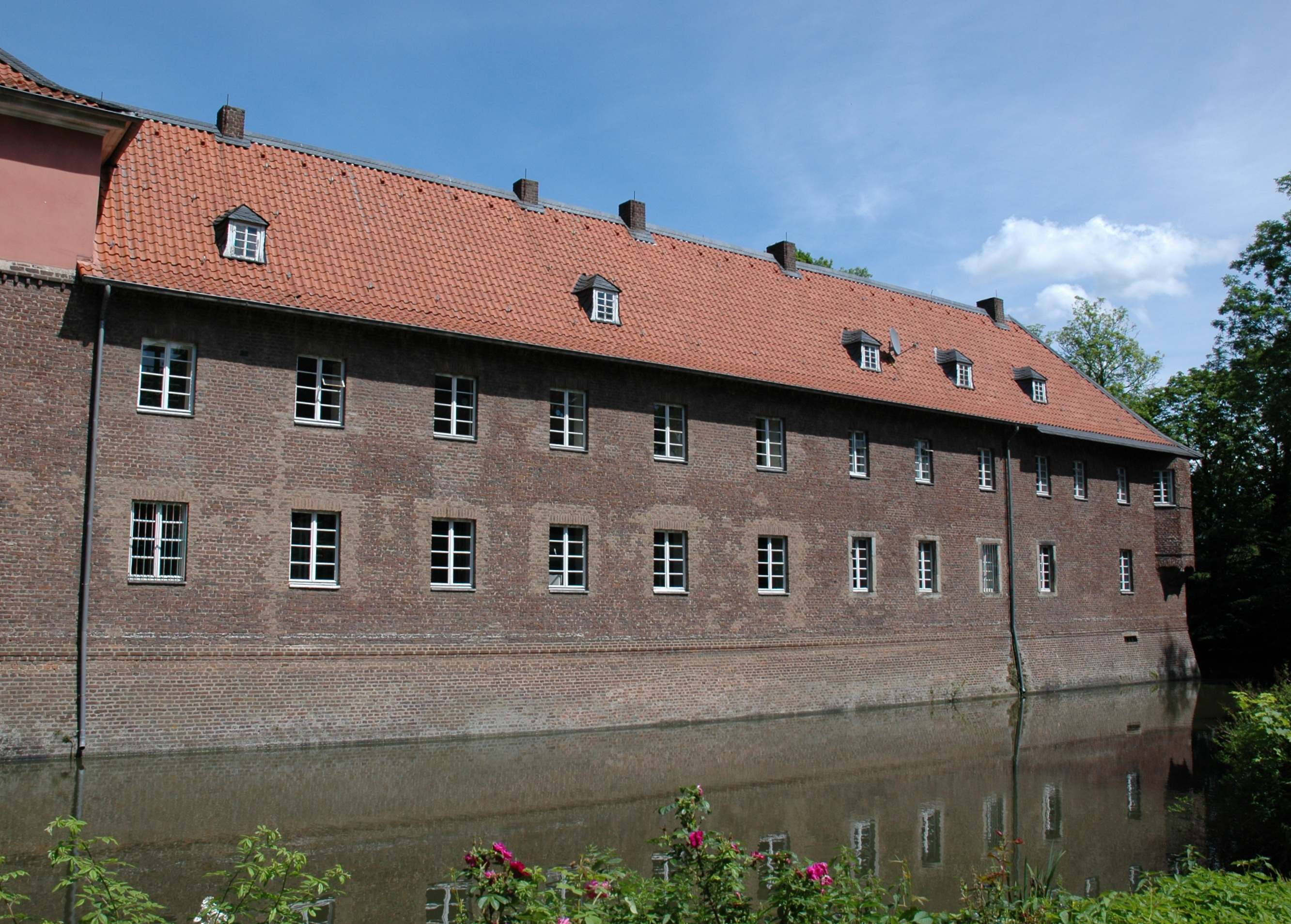
South outer Bailey wing (2014)

=== Farmyard ===
The unrendered brick courtyard, also known as the outer bailey, used to occupy the eastern part of the north and south wings as well as the entire east wing of the complex. The first floor housed cattle, sheep, game and horse stables as well as the manorial stables, tack room, coachman's room and cleaning room. After farming was abandoned, some of the stables were converted into a coach house and riding hall as well as a wood store. The upper floors housed the quarters for horse and cattle servants, stable staff and other servants such as the head forester, whose apartment was built in 1807. They were converted into apartments in the 1960s. There was also a large grain barn in the eastern outer bailey wing. At the south-east corner of the buildings there is a small oriel on the upper floor, which can already be seen on the Roidkin drawing of the 18th century and thus belongs to the building stock of the Baroque complex. It was probably higher than the roof in the past and served as a lookout. The southern and eastern outer façade is decorated with a simple tooth frieze on the eaves and base cornice, which can also be found in part on the courtyard-side façades. In the past, all sides of the courtyard were decorated with it.

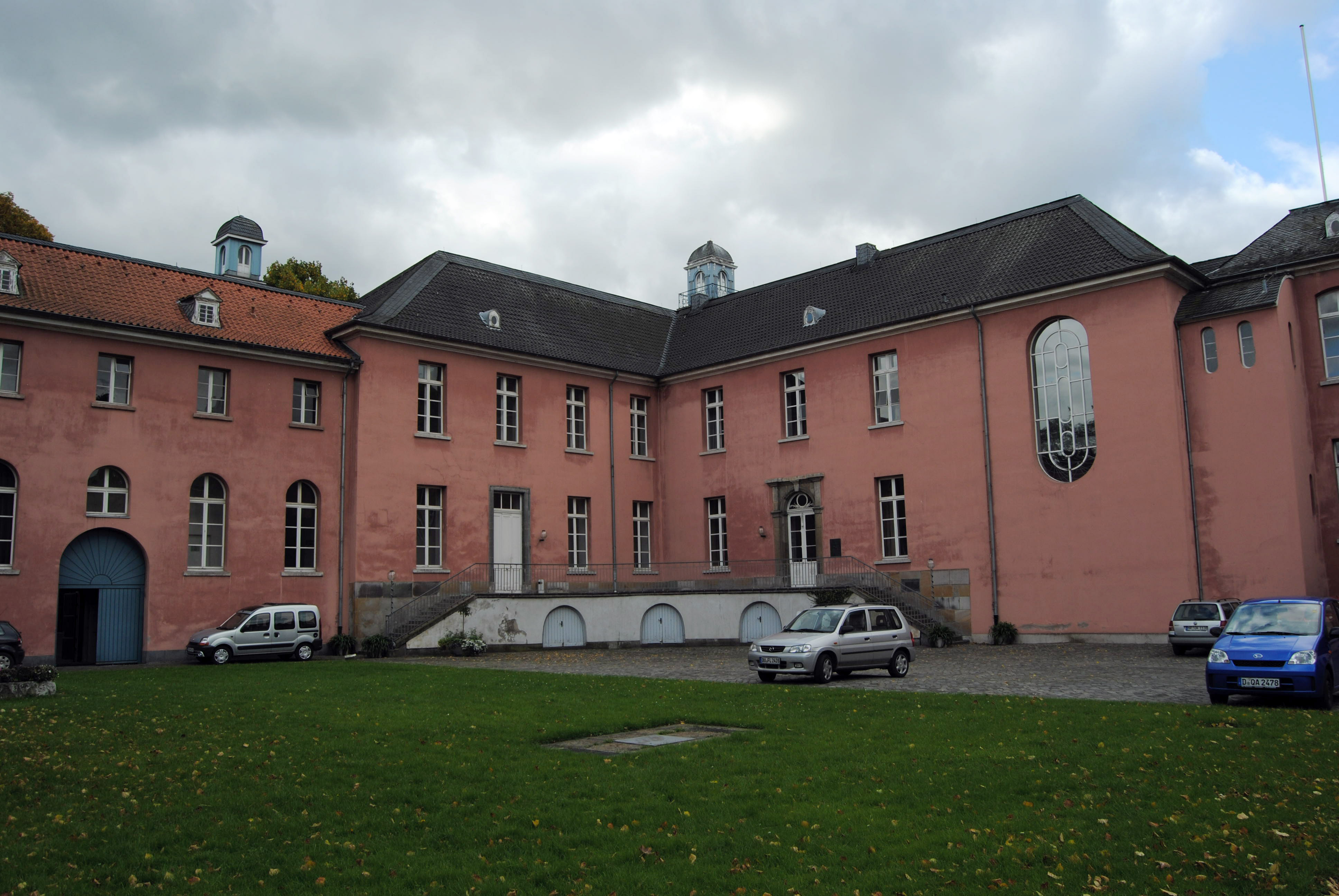
Manor house and kitchen building, view from the inner courtyard (2011)

=== Western part ===
The western part of the castle consists of the manor house with corner tower in the south-western area, its structural counterpart at the north-western corner of the complex and a central building that connects the two parts and also houses the main portal. Because the residential and administrative rooms of the castle were located in this area, the western section, which is over 100 meters long, is particularly representative and forms the showpiece. This is reflected, for example, in the fact that it is plastered and painted pink and is also higher than the service buildings.

The northern part of the west wing was occupied by storage areas, warehouses and ancillary rooms on the first floor before it was converted into archive space. The upper floor housed the manorial living quarters, bedrooms and guest rooms. Externally, this part of the castle resembles the west wing of the manor house. The western part of the north wing is called the pensioner and domestics wing or simply the pensioner wing. Its first floor is the former Halfmannshaus, while the upper floor, which was added later, formerly housed the rooms of the Rentei and the rentmaster's apartment. Like the northern part of the west wing, the building has a tile covered hipped roof. At the eastern end of the Reintei wing is a slender square tower with two storeys, topped by a hipped roof. It has an almost identical counterpart at the eastern end of the manor house. The outer façades of the two wings are divided into eight axes by windows, with four of the eight first floor windows each having a segmental arch roof. This axial emphasis is repeated in the attic with small dormer windows. The windows of the manor house are - like almost all the windows in the west section - fitted with gray shutters. The segmental arches can be found above the first floor windows of the two three-storey corner towers, while the openings above them on the second floor are crowned by triangular gables. Both towers have curved hoods, which are topped by a gallery-enclosed lantern. Kalkum's tower hoods are thus somewhat similar to those of Schloss Clemensruhe in Bonn-Poppelsdorf. The manor house has two entrances on the courtyard side, both of which have their own small open staircase. These were connected by a shared platform in 1824. Next to the entrance in the west wing, a bronze plaque commemorates the "red countess" Sophie von Hatzfeldt.

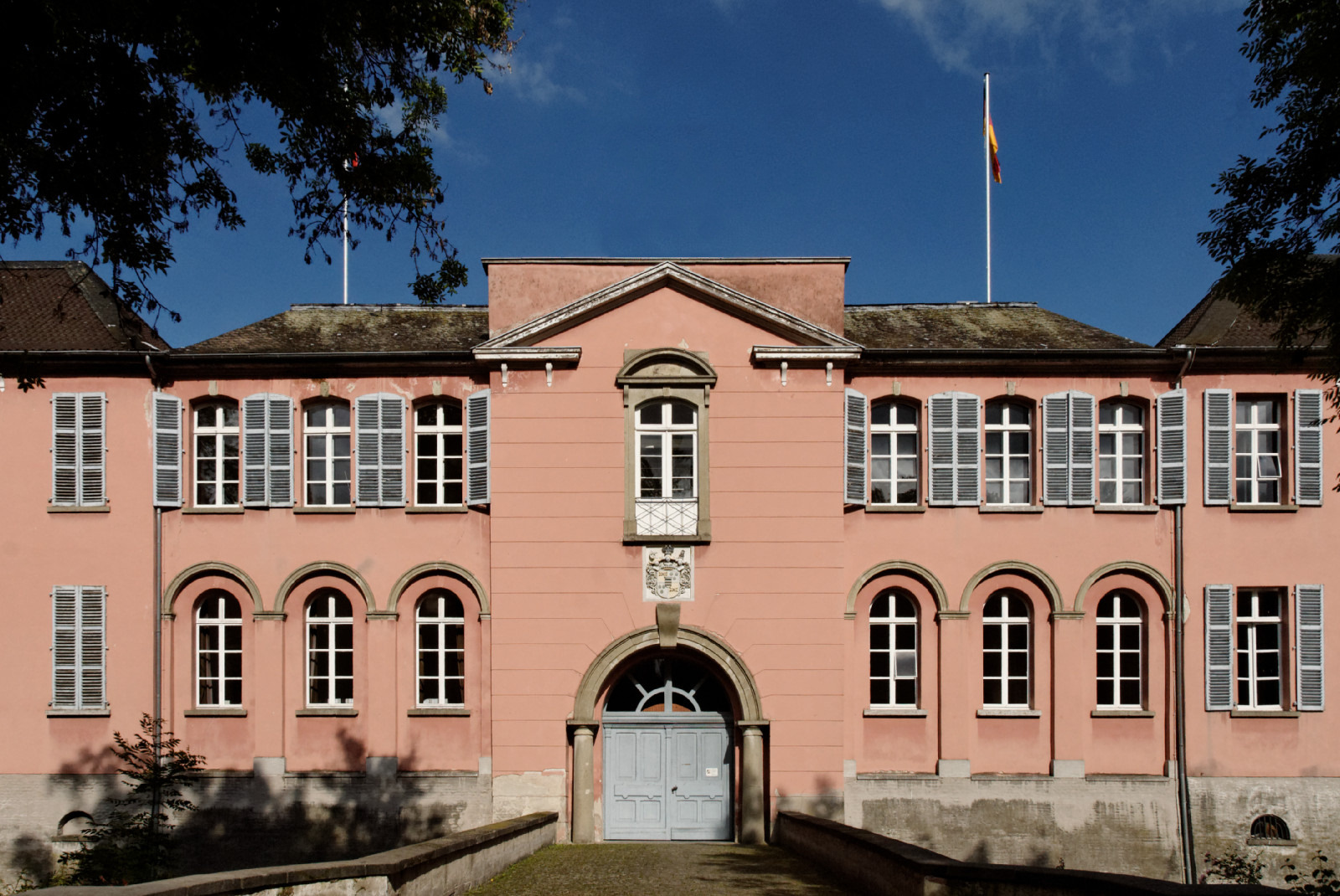
Central building of the west wing with the main portal (2014)

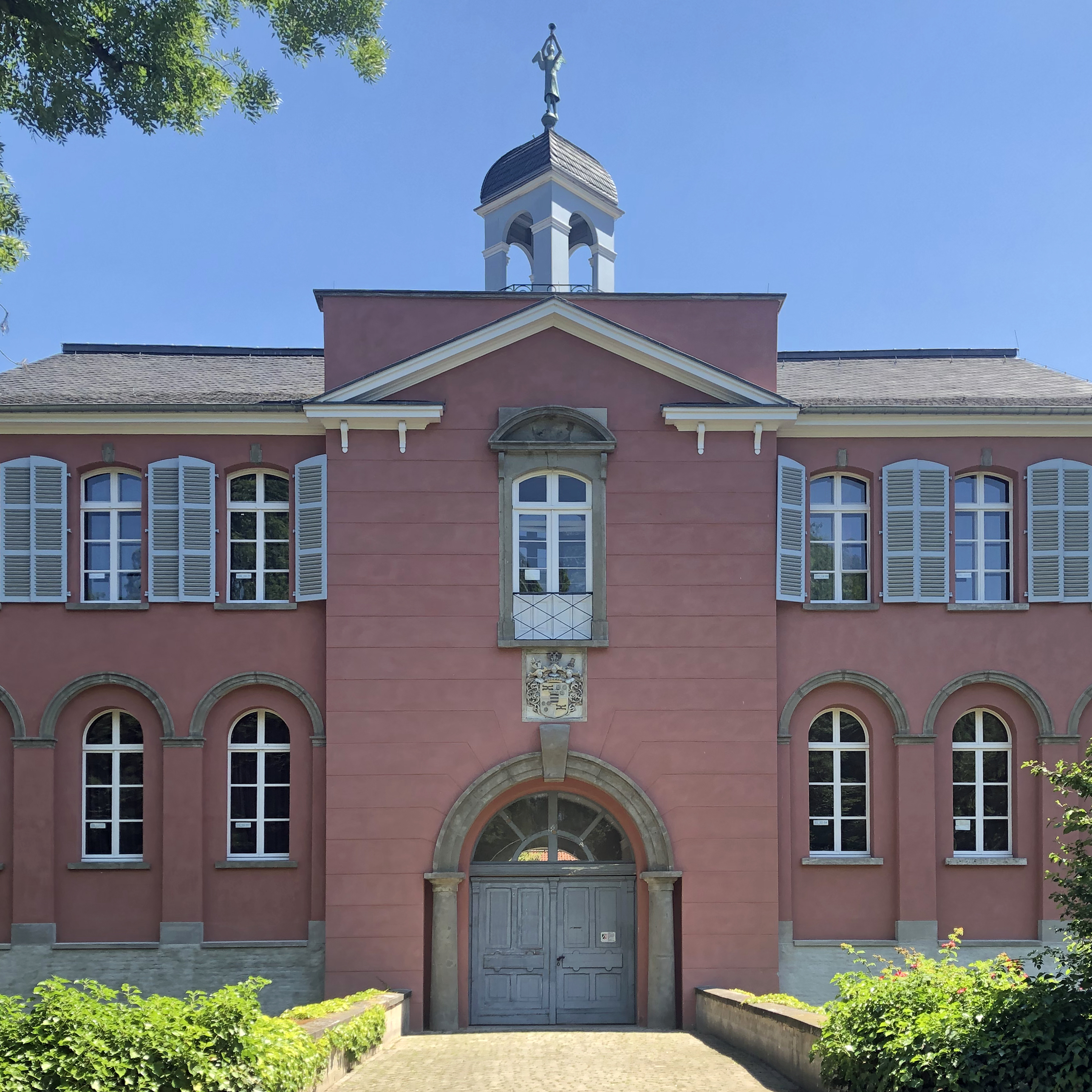
West entrance portal with trombone angel on the tower attachment of the castle roof (2020)

The middle of the west front is occupied by an intermediate building with the main portal of the palace. In contrast to the windows in the other parts of the palace, the building has shutterless arched windows on the first floor surrounded by blind arcades. Although it also has two storeys, its flat hipped roof makes it lower than the other parts of the western section. The lantern motif of the corner towers is repeated on the roof by a small turret, which was erected there in 1967. It is modeled on a predecessor that had been destroyed by lightning. The tower top has been missing since at least the beginning of 2014. Now back again. The angel has since been restored. The wide Zufahrtsallee, christened "Kalkumer Schloßallee" on 18 September 1931, runs in a straight line over a distance of just over one kilometer towards this Portalbau. Shortly before the three-arched bridge over the moat, the access road crosses the Schwarzbach over a small plastered brick bridge dating from 1809, which is flanked by two statues of reclining lions. They were made in 1652 by the master sculptor Johann from Kaiserswerth. The round-arched west gate, also known as the English Gate, is located in a Mittelrisalit built according to plans by Johann Peter Cremer with a joint cut and flat triangular pediment. It is flanked by dorizing columns. Above the archway is a richly decorated relief with the coat of arms of the von Hatzfeld-Wildenburg family. It shows the Hatzfeld coat of arms (black wall anchor in gold) in fields 1 and 4 and the Wildenburg coat of arms (three red roses in silver) in fields 2 and 3. The relief was created in 1854 by the Düsseldorf sculptor Dietrich Mein(h)ardus, who also designed the western entrance door of the manor house, which is richly decorated with carvings.

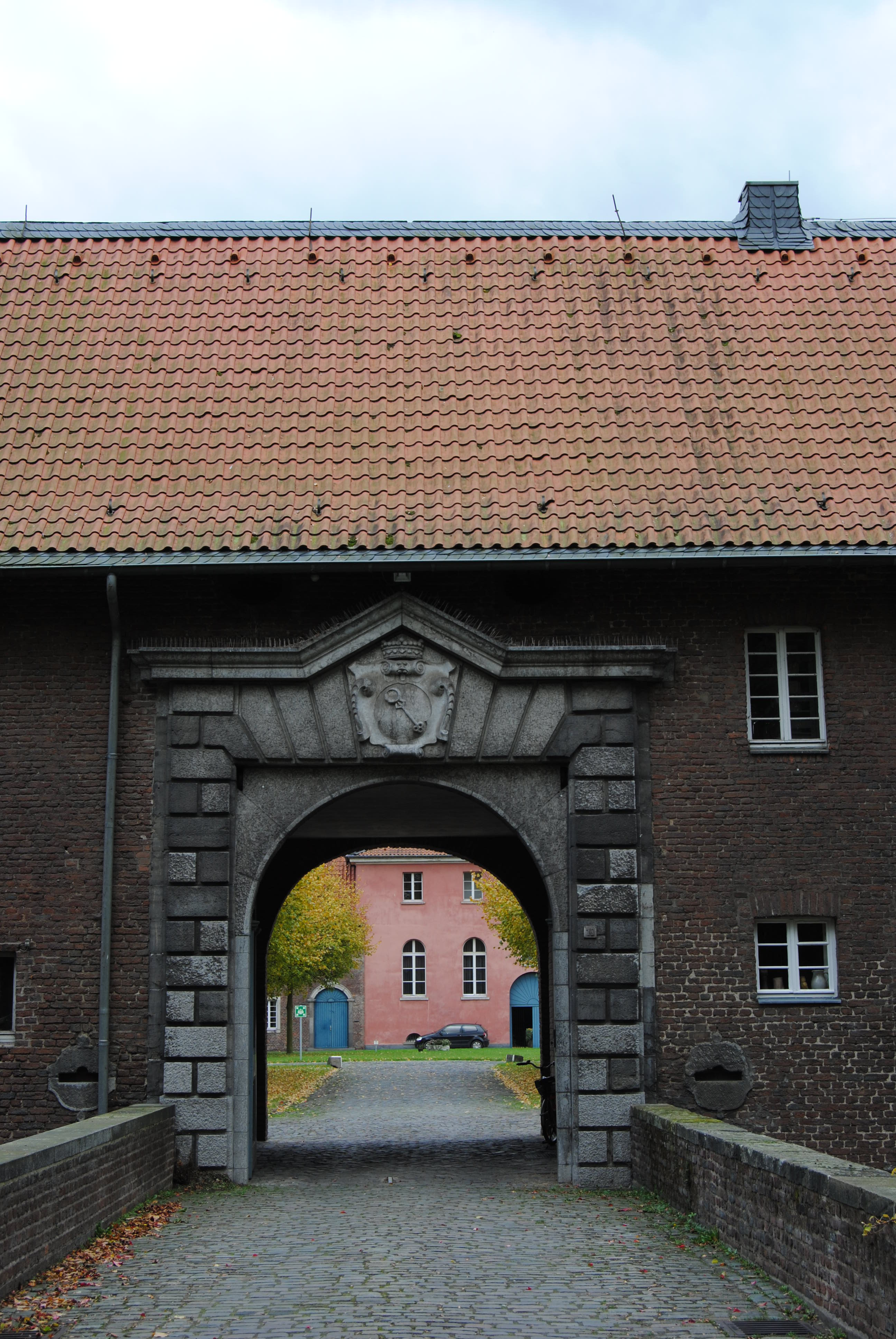
Nordtor (2011)

=== North gate, kitchen building and inner courtyard ===
Until the neoclassical conversion at the beginning of the 19th century, the main entrance to the palace was in the north of the grounds. Accordingly, the castle gate in the middle of the north wing was more elaborately designed than the rest of the north wing. A four-arched bridge leads to it, the first three arches of which are made of trachyte ashlars, while the last is made of brick, thus documenting that the gate once had a drawbridge. Anchor plates in the form of the year 1775 bear witness to the construction of the bridge in that year, which replaced a wooden predecessor at the time. The rollers of the former drawbridge are still preserved in the semicircular archway, and the aperture for holding the bridge is also still clearly visible. Furthermore, two embrasures for hooked rifles on the sides of the gate framed by Boss ashlars made of Ratinger limestone bear witness to its former defensibility. In the keystone of the archway is the coat of arms of the von Winkelhausen family, framed by auricles and scrollwork and crowned by a count's crown. In the past, it was probably painted in color. Below it is the year 1663, which is only partially preserved and thus testifies to the year of construction of this wing.

The former gap between the south wing of the manor house and the south wing of the farmyard has been closed since 1810 by the so-called kitchen building (also known as the kitchen wing). The name of the three-axis intermediate building shows that it has always been home to a kitchen. Its three storeys - the two upper storeys are considerably lower than the ground floor - are enclosed by a flat gabled roof. On the first floor of the kitchen building there is a side gate, to which a modern concrete bridge leads today. In the past, the southern moat was spanned by a wooden bridge that led to the neighboring, slender square tower and the gate there. Its foundations were found in 1948 during repair work.

The courtyard façades of the castle are all very plain and give the impression of an estate rather than a princely residence. The only special feature of the inner courtyard are three Linden ring, which take up three quarters of the courtyard area. The fourth area, facing the manor house, is designed as a paved driveway courtyard. The trees were planted in 1825 according to plans by Weyhe.

=== Today's interiors ===
Kalkum Palace offers a total of 6500 square meters of usable space. Visitors enter the vestibule in the west wing of the manor house through the main entrance on the courtyard side with its Ratingen marble jamb. Called the Marble Hall because of its black and white marble flooring, this room is the first in a series of living and ceremonial rooms, which today are also referred to as state rooms. This sequence of rooms, consisting of the Marble Hall, Brown Room, Green Room, Billiard Room and Music Room as well as the former dining room and library, was - with the exception of the former dining room - restored from 1956 to 1960 with its late classicist furnishings and subsequently fitted with historical furniture and matching chandeliers. Today, the rooms present themselves with restored or reconstructed wall and ceiling paintings, splendidly designed stucco work and precious parquet floors with inlays. Of the old original 19th century furnishings, only two mirrors and two chandeliers (one of which is in the billiard room) remain in the palace.

The south wing of the manor house is occupied on the first floor by two large three-axis halls. In the 1950s, the eastern one had no original furnishings, so it was renovated in a simple style and can now be used as a conference hall. Only its stucco rosette dates from an earlier period (around 1870). In contrast, the western hall was almost completely restored to its former splendor from 1836 to 1841. However, its original ceiling paintings have been lost. It is called the Music Hall after the motifs in the wall panels depicting lyres. Above the marble fireplace on the long side opposite the windows is a wall mirror framed by ornate stucco ornamentation. A stucco ceiling frieze and surrounding arabesques as wall paintings complete the lavish décor of this room, the highlight of which is the floor with a covering of valuable precious woods with inlays of mother-of-pearl. Ludwig Pose was also responsible for the decorative paintings here, while Lenhard and Moosbrugger created the stucco work. The library on the first floor of the southwest tower is accessible through a wallpaper door in the western wall of the music hall. The originally square room was transformed into an octagon by the addition of walls at the corners. On three of the four recessed walls are glass shelving cabinets, which were installed there in 1854. The ceiling painting of the room imitates a coffered ceiling, while the inlaid floor is characterized by a star motif.

The upper floor of the manor house - the former residential floor of the building - now houses modern administrative offices, a library, a user room and the restoration workshops of the State Archives, which moved in there in July 1958. The original furnishings from the first half of the 19th century are no longer preserved, with the exception of some stucco work by the Krefeld stucco artist Eugen Selb. The only room that still dates from the Hatzfeld era is the so-called tower room. This is presumably the bedroom of Countess Maria Anna in the south-western corner tower, which was designed in the Empire style according to plans by Leydel.

=== Castle park ===
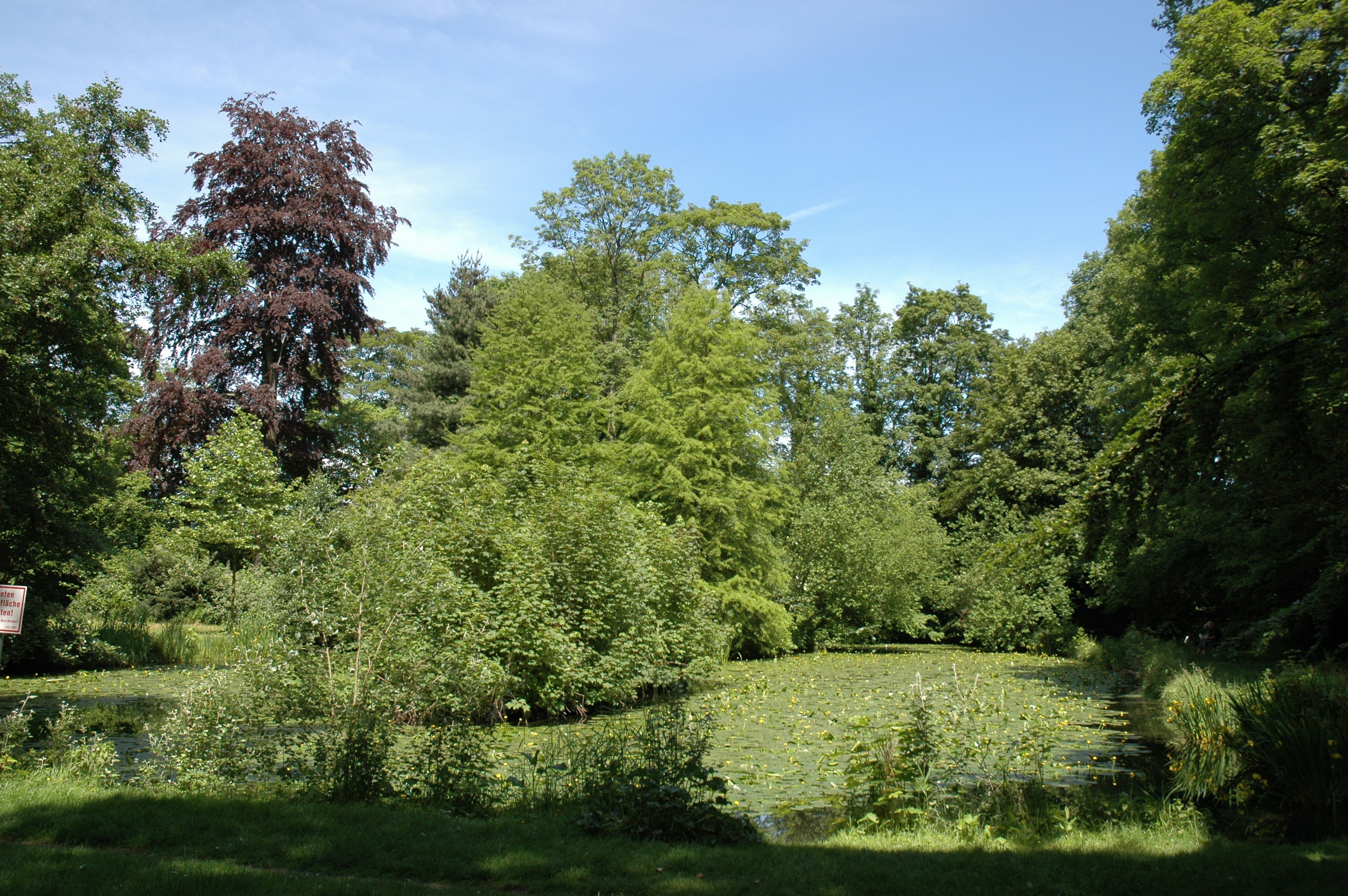
Englischer Teich

==== Weyhe's new layout ====
Maximilian Friedrich Weyhe's design for the Kalkum castle park dates back to 1808. As a central element, he envisaged a landscape garden in the English style, which featured the typical elements of this park form: visual axes, curved paths, groups of trees and solitary trees. The old castle mill from the 18th century on the southern edge of the park was incorporated into the design. Weyhe also took into account the existing gardens on the west and south sides of the castle in his plan. The south garden can already be seen in the 18th century Roidkin drawing, where it is connected to the palace buildings by a wooden bridge. The strictly symmetrical garden followed Baroque models and was divided into four equal squares by two paths crossing at right angles in the middle. At the intersection was a rondel planted with trees, the paths were bordered by hedges. Weyhe transformed it into a kitchen garden. To the east of the palace, he had a large, geometrically structured orchard laid out on the other side of the road, for which apricot, cherry, apple and pear trees were purchased. They stood along paths that ran in a star shape towards a central traffic circle. In the southern kitchen garden, sweet chestnuts and chestnuts stood alongside fruit trees. On the north side of the palace, Weyhe created two rectangular Compartments. The eastern one was intended to incorporate a riding arena as a formal garden element, but this was only realized as a rectangular lawn. The western compartment consisted of a tree-lined, elongated pond with a small island, also known as the "English pond". It was bordered by a band of lawn and a path running around it.

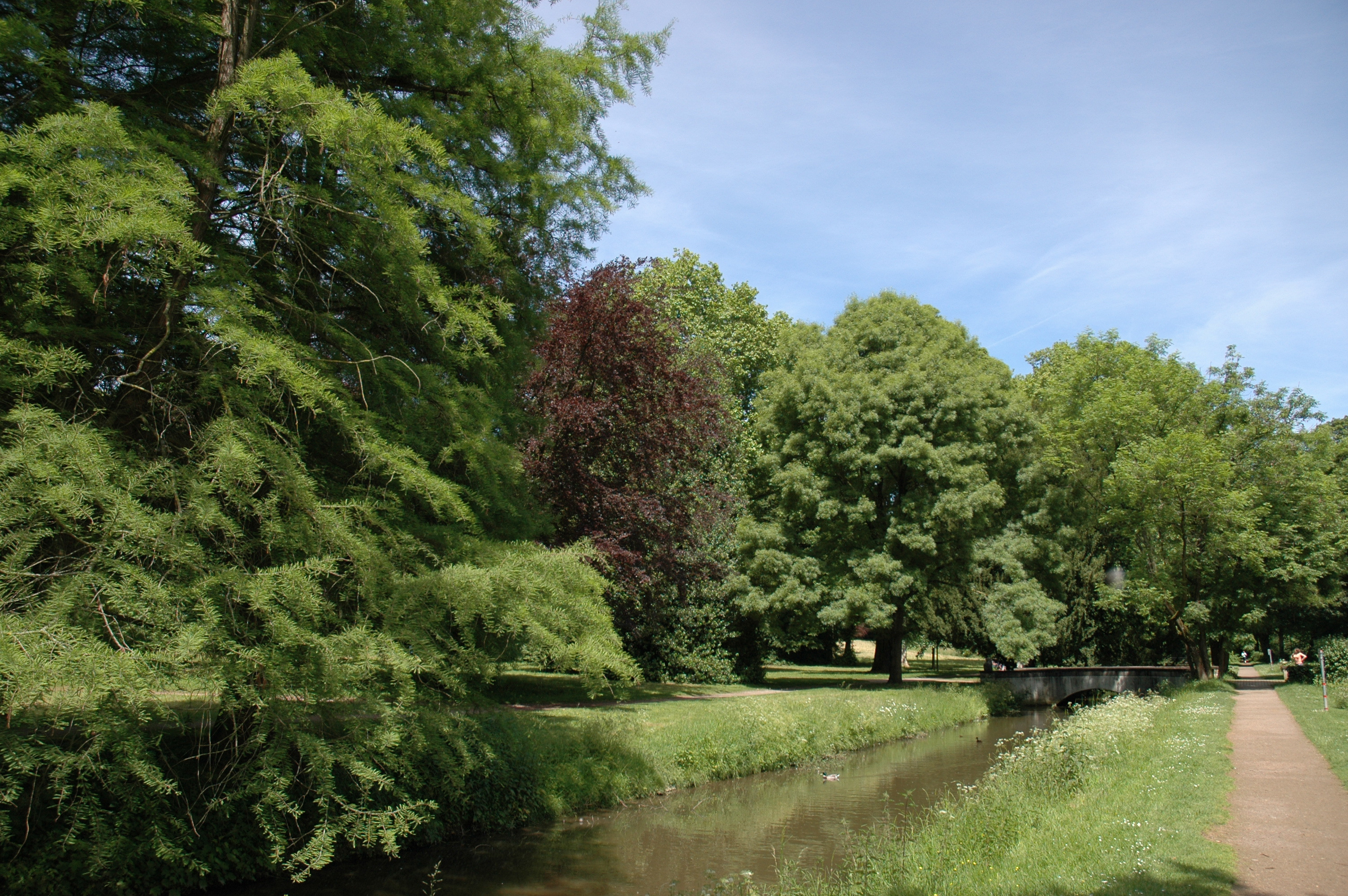
The Schwarzbach canalized by Weyhe in the castle park

The existing small garden on the west side of the grounds was considerably enlarged and the western central axis of the palace was extended through the Schlossallee to Kaiserswerth. For its transformation into an English landscape garden, Weyhe purchased a large number of different types of trees and shrubs, including weeping ashs, weeping willows, Red firs, Acacia, Weymouth pines, Sweet chestnut, Canadian poplar, Dutch elms and red cedars. This area of the palace park also included a bowling alley established in 1812, which is recognizable on the Pesch map as a cross-shaped construction in the southern part of the park, a shooting range consisting of a long rampart with a small hill at the end, and an ice cellar on the southern edge of the park that already existed in 1809. A small temple with a hexagonal floor plan, surrounded by eight pillars and with an eight-columned top, was erected on a mound created by the excavation of the castle pond.

With his park design, Weyhe created spatially and functionally separate garden spaces that communicated with the respective neighboring palace wings and were co-determined in size and design by their architecture. Each of the garden spaces was designed differently and fulfilled a different purpose. While the landscape garden and the northern compartments were dedicated to pastime, sport and pleasure, the south and east gardens fulfilled practical purposes as kitchen gardens, where aesthetic and practical concerns were mixed, as the fruit and vegetable gardens also had decorative elements to a certain extent.

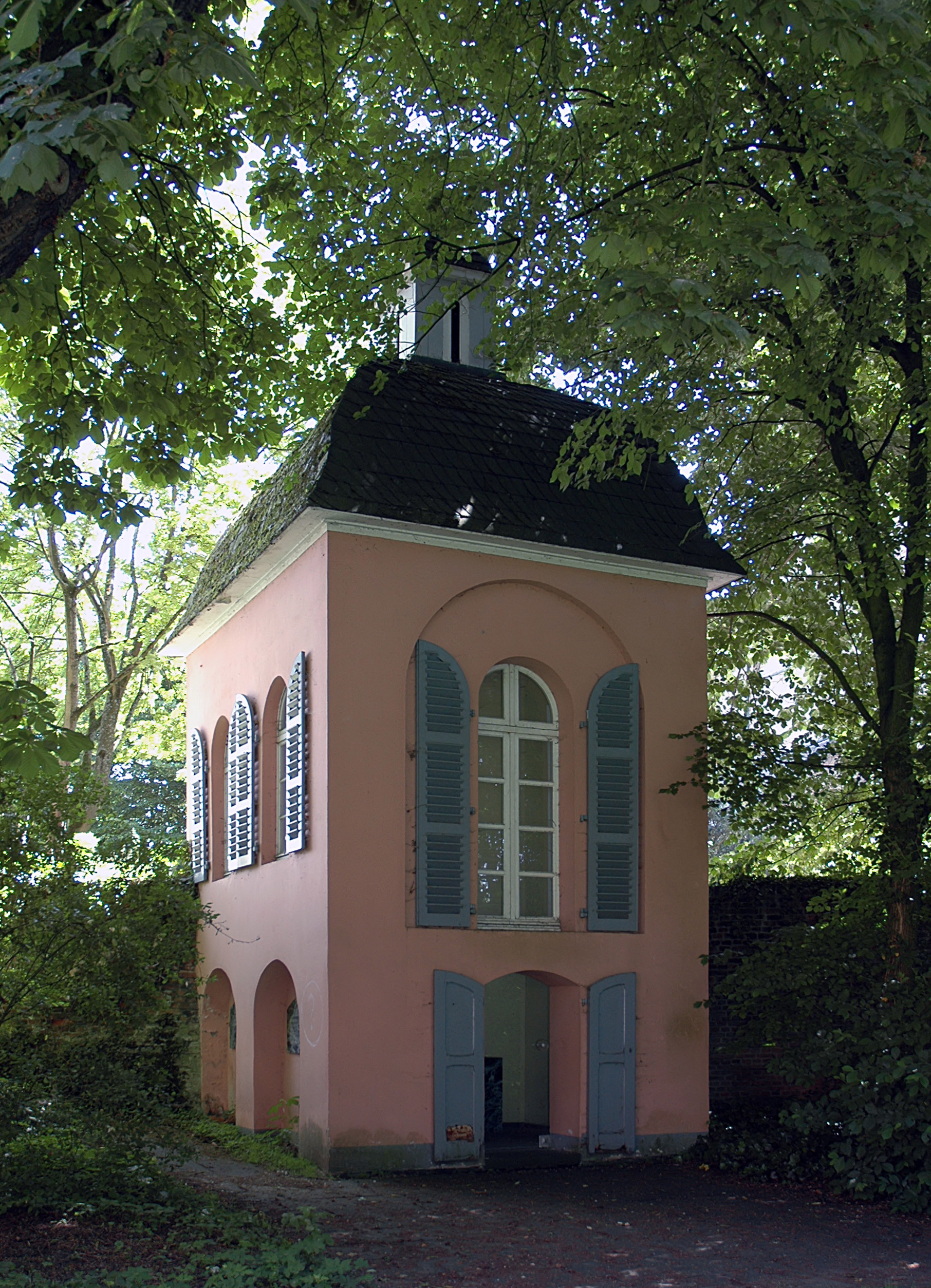
Former garden pavilion, today Lassalle monument

==== The park today ====
Of the palace park laid out by Maximilian Friedrich Weyhe, the basic structures of the semi-circular English landscape garden on the west side, the northern compartments and the basic layout of the southern kitchen garden are still preserved today. In the park, whose grounds rise and fall in undulating lines, there are mostly native trees and only a few exotic species. For example, the avenue leading up to the west portal is lined with lime trees. Two smaller, curved paths branch off from this access road in the central axis and lead around the landscape park, which is bordered on the outside by hedges and woodland planting, until they meet the canalized Schwarzbach stream at the southwest and northwest corners of the castle and cross it by means of small bridges. The Schwarzbach feeds the castle moat and the northern castle pond. Coming from Wülfrath, it enters the palace park in the south, crosses it by flowing a long way parallel to the western palace moat - separated from it only by a dam with a narrow path - to flow into the Rhine north of the palace park at Wittlaer. On the southern edge of the park is the ice cellar, which dates back to the beginning of the 19th century and still has an entrance. Nearby, in the area of the south-western park meadow, there is a small mound with masonry. These are the remains of the shooting range established in 1819. On the opposite northern edge of the park, there is still the artificially heaped up Tempelberg, whose small Chinese wooden temple is no longer preserved.

At the edge of the southern moat on the eastern enclosure wall is a small orangery, which replaced the large orangery built under Weyhe. It was completely overhauled in 1965/66. The former garden pavilion, also known as the summer house and tea house, leans against the eastern wall from the inside. Like the castle, the small tower-like plaster building is painted pink and is topped by a baroque dome with a lantern. Its exact date of construction is unknown, but it may date back to plans by Georg Peter Leydel What is certain is that it was not built in connection with Maximilian Friedrich Weyhe's park plans, but already existed at the time. During the major renovation work in the first half of the 19th century, work was carried out in the pavilion several times. For example, it was painted by Ludwig Pose, who was also responsible for the wall and ceiling paintings in the manor house. The garden house was converted into a memorial to Ferdinand Lassalle in 1975 to mark the 150th anniversary of his birth. The interior of the building is designed as a cenotaph. A block of green Italian marble has the shape of a sarcophagus, above which stands the bust of Lassalle on a marble corbel. On the northern outer wall of the pavilion, plaques made of the same marble hang in two shallow niches with a quote by Ferdinand Lassalle as well as data on his life and work.

== Literature ==
- Walter Bader (Hrsg.): Schloss Kalkum. DuMont, Köln 1968.
- Georg Dehio, Claudia Euskirchen (Bearb.): Handbuch der Deutschen Kunstdenkmäler. Nordrhein-Westfalen. Band 1: Rheinland. Deutscher Kunstverlag, Berlin 2005, ISBN 3-422-03093-X, S. 332–333.
- Günther Engelbert: Schloß Kalkum bei Düsseldorf. Ein Beitrag zu seiner Baugeschichte. In: Düsseldorfer Jahrbuch. Nr. 47, 1955, ISSN 0342-0019, P. 199–234.
- Ludger Fischer: Die schönsten Schlösser und Burgen am Niederrhein. Wartberg-Verlag, Gudensberg-Gleichen 2004, ISBN 3-8313-1326-1, S. 44–45.
- Robert Janke, Harald Herzog: Burgen und Schlösser im Rheinland. Greven, Köln 2005, ISBN 3-7743-0368-1, P. 182–185.
- Benedikt Mauer: Schloss Kalkum. In: Kai Niederhöfer (Red.): Burgen Aufruhr. Unterwegs zu 100 Burgen, Schlössern und Herrensitzen in der Ruhrregion. Klartext, Essen 2010, ISBN 978-3-8375-0234-3, P. 112–114.
- Karl Emerich Krämer: Von Brühl bis Kranenburg. Burgen, Schlösser, Tore und Türme, die man besichtigen kann. Mercator, Duisburg 1979, ISBN 3-87463-074-9, P. 90–93.
- Karl Pfeffer: Düsseldorf-Kalkum (= Rheinisches Kunststätten, Heft 178). 2. Auflage, Neusser Druckerei und Verlag, Neuss 1995, ISBN 3-88094-800-3, P. 4–25.
- Rolf Watty: Schloss Kalkum. Eine Führung durch die äußere Schlossanlage im Rahmen einer Studienfahrt am 15.5.2004. In: Heiligenhauser Geschichtsverein (Hrsg.): Cis Hilinciweg. Broschüre des Heiligenhauser Geschichtsvereins e. V. Nr. 8, 2005, P. 32–34.
- Fritz Wiesenberger: Schloßromantik gleich nebenan. Schlösser und Burgen in Düsseldorf und Umgebung. 2. Auflage. Triltsch, Düsseldorf 1983, ISBN 3-7998-0007-7, S. 47–52.
- Hermann Maria Wollschläger: Burgen und Schlösser im Bergischen Land. 2. Auflage. Wienand, Köln 1990, ISBN 3-87909-242-7, P. 124–127.
