= Posing (disambiguation) =

Posing is the act of taking a pose, a stance, a body posture

Posing or variant may also refer to:

- Role-playing, posing in a role
- Pösing, Cham, Bavaria, Germany
- Posing, an early form of the waacking style of street dance

== See also ==
- Strike a pose (disambiguation)
- Poser (disambiguation)
- Pose (disambiguation)
