= Poser =

Poser or Posers may refer to:

== People ==
- Poseur, a person who inauthentically adopts a certain subculture
- Bob Poser (1910–2002), U.S. baseball player
- Charles Poser (1923–2010), Belgian-American neurologist
- Christian Poser (born 1986), German bobsledder
- Dániel Póser (born 1990), Hungarian soccer player
- Heinrich von Poser (1599–1661), German traveloguer
- Lydia Poser (1909–1984), German politician
- Rainer Poser (born 1941), German boxer
- Sophie Poser (born 1985), German track and field athlete
- Susan Poser (born 1963), U.S. academic
- Udo Poser (born 1947), German swimmer
- William Poser, Canadian-American linguist

== Other uses ==
- Poser (software), a 3D computer graphics program distributed by Bondware
- Poser (film), 2021 American drama film
- Posers (film), 2003 drama film written and directed by Katie Tallo

== See also ==
- Poser criteria, a now deprecated diagnostics for diagnosing multiple sclerosis
- Pose (disambiguation)
- Posing (disambiguation)
