= Posies =

Posies may refer to:

- Plural of posy
- Butterflies of the genus Drupadia
- The Posies, American alternative rock music group

== See also ==
- Poses (disambiguation)
- Poise (disambiguation)
- Posy (given name)
