= Poise =

Poise may mean:

- Poise (unit), a measure of viscosity
- A concept similar to gracefulness
- Ferdinand Poise (1828–1892), French composer
- Poise pads and liners for incontinence, a brand of Kimberly-Clark

== See also ==
- Pose (disambiguation)
- Posies (disambiguation)
