= Eduard Wilhelm Pose =

German painter

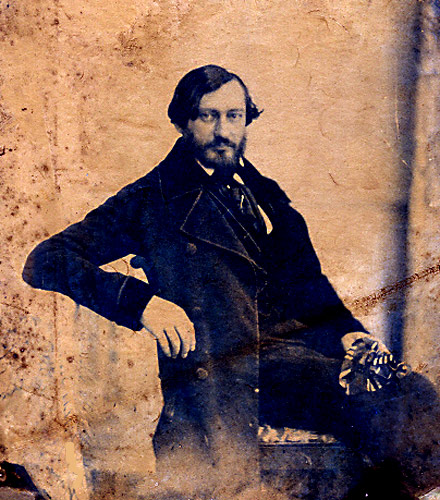
- Pose in 1846 (modern photograph of a salt print negative)
- Born: 9 July 1812; Düsseldorf
- Died: 14 March 1878 (aged 65); Frankfurt am Main
- Known for: Landscape painting
- Movement: Romanticism, Düsseldorf school of painting

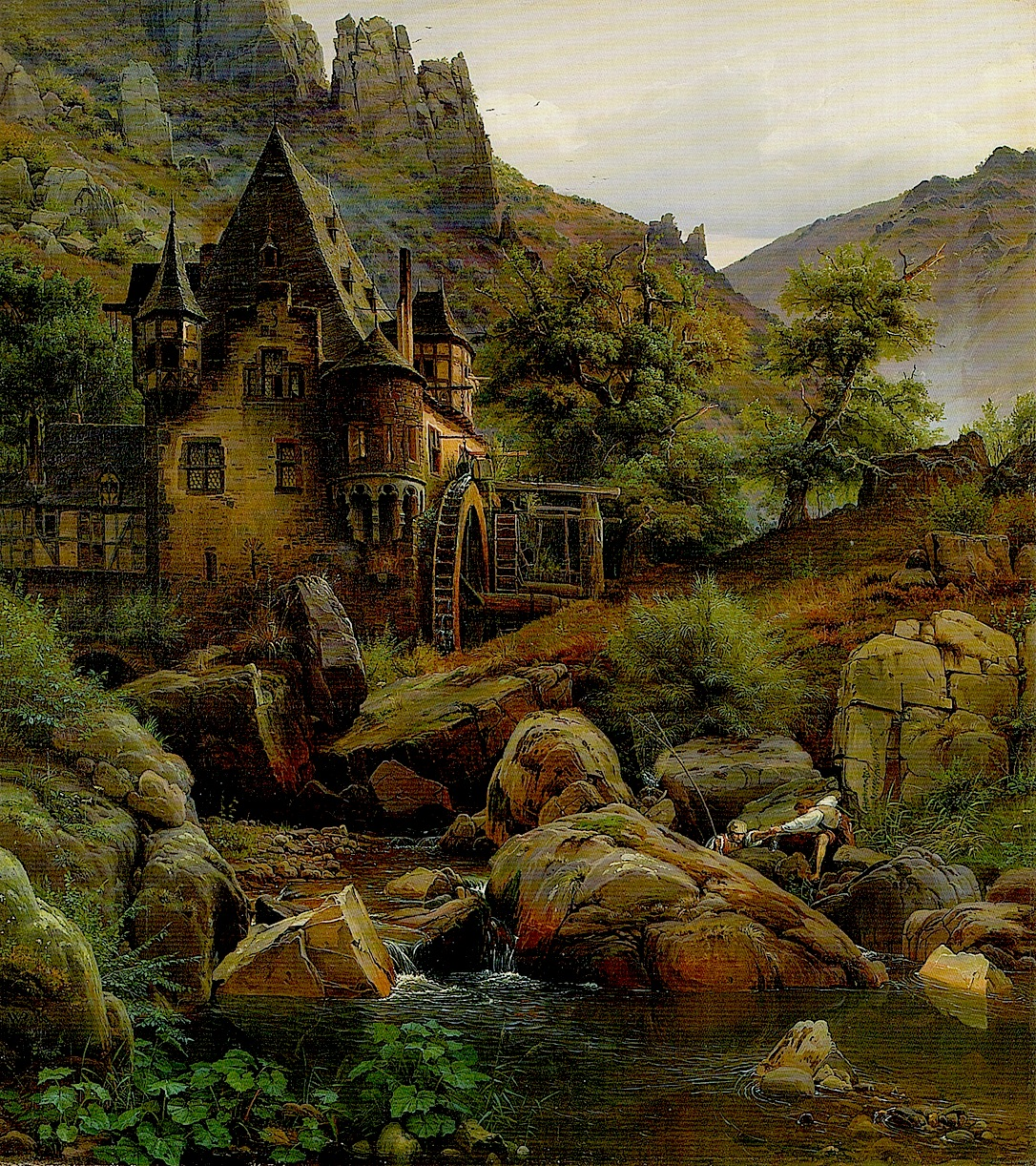
Landscape with Mill on the Morgenbach (Morning Brook) in Rheinland-Pfalz

Eduard Wilhelm Pose (9 July 1812 – 14 March 1878) was a German Romantic landscape painter associated with the Düsseldorf school of painting.

== Biography ==
He was born in Düsseldorf. His father, Ludwig Pose, was a decorative painter. As a boy, he accompanied him on his work throughout the Rhineland. During a visit to Rheinstein Castle, where his father had received a commission from Prince Frederick, he decided to become a painter too.

From 1829 to 1836, he attended the Kunstakademie Düsseldorf and studied with the landscape painter, Johann Wilhelm Schirmer from 1832 to 1833. His first landscapes depicted the regions of Hunsrück and Eifel and received excellent marks. In 1836, he and several other students left the Kunstakademie, due to conflicts with its conservative director, Friedrich Wilhelm Schadow.

He went to Munich and found a position in the studios of Carl Rottmann. An outbreak of cholera led to him to move to Frankfurt am Main and find work painting the Eltz Castle. He returned to Munich in 1838. Shortly after, he exhibited his painting of Tyrol Castle in Brussels, where it was purchased by King Leopold I.

He then returned to Düsseldorf, living with his sister and her husband, the architect Max Joseph Custodis, and travelling with other artists throughout the region. He spent the years 1842–1845 in Italy, mostly in Rome, where his palette brightened considerably. After 1845, he went back to Frankfurt am Main and became part of the circle of artists associated with Philipp Veit. In his later years, he was involved with the artists' colony at Kronberg im Taunus.

He and his wife, Pauline (née Klotz, 1817–1867), made the acquaintance of Gustave Courbet during his visit to Frankfurt in 1858. Courbet used her as the model for his painting Lady of Frankfurt. It is believed that Pose was originally in the painting as well, but was later erased. His exclusion has led to speculation concerning an affair between Pauline and Courbet.

Pose died on 14 March 1878 in Frankfurt at the age of 65.
