= Landesarchiv Nordrhein-Westfalen =

State archive of North Rhine Westphalia, Germany

Coordinates: 51.4372°N 6.7581°E

NRW State Archive
- Landesarchiv NRW Duisburg
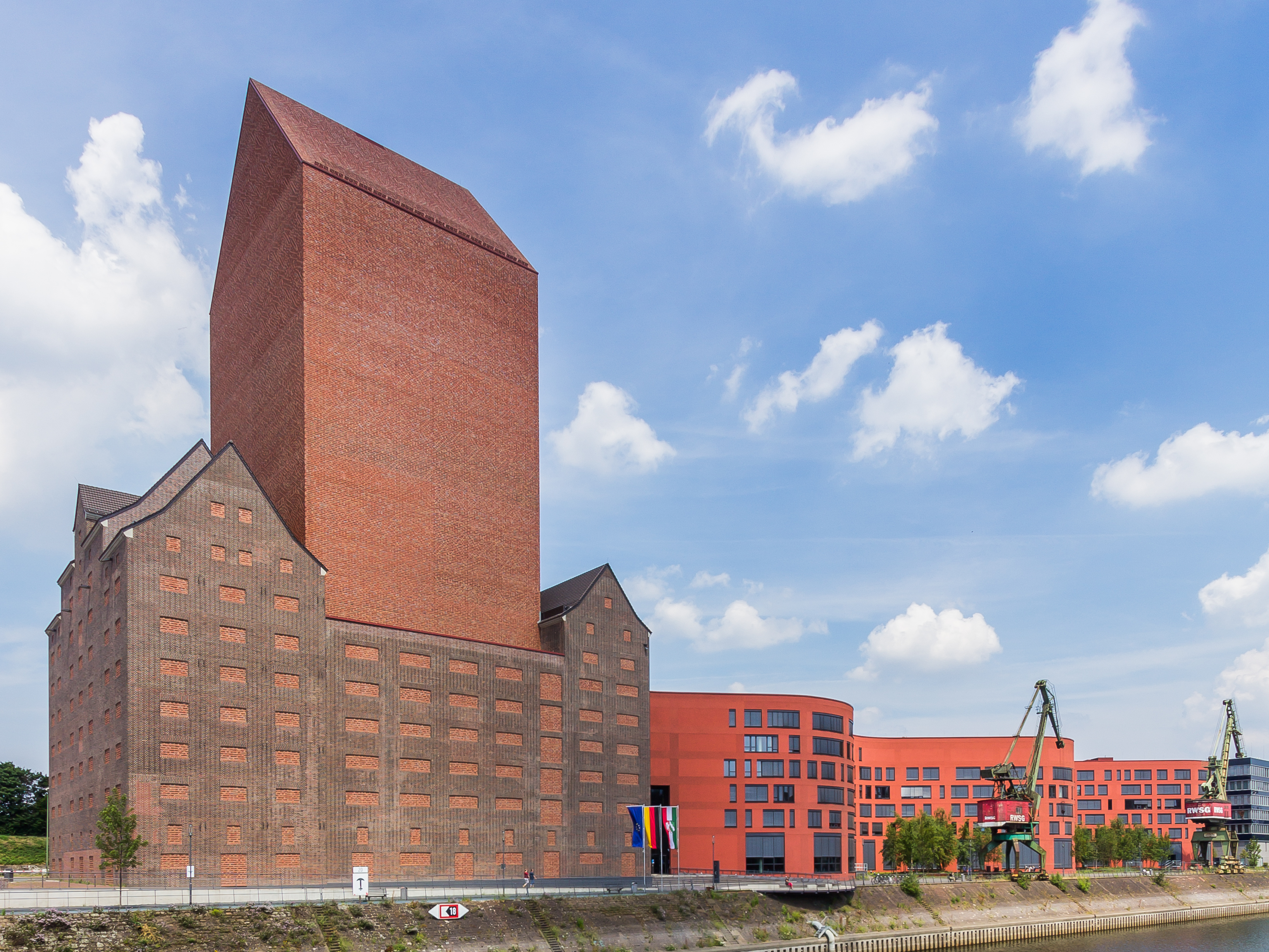

General information
- Location: Duisburg, Germany
- Completed: 2014

Design and construction
- Architects: O&O Baukunst

The Landesarchiv Nordrhein-Westfalen (abbreviated as Landesarchiv NRW) is the state archive of the state of North Rhine Westphalia, in the city of Duisburg, Germany. The complex, featuring a tower addition to an existing 1930s warehouse, as well as a snake-like administation building, was completed in 2014. It is notable for containing a windowless building converted from a former granary, combined with a new, equally windowless, purpose-built archive building.
