= Dietrich Meinardus =

German sculptor (1804–1871)

Dietrich Meinardus (8 February 1804 – 5 January 1871) was a German sculptor and stonemason of the historicist movement, known for his works in Düsseldorf.

== Life ==
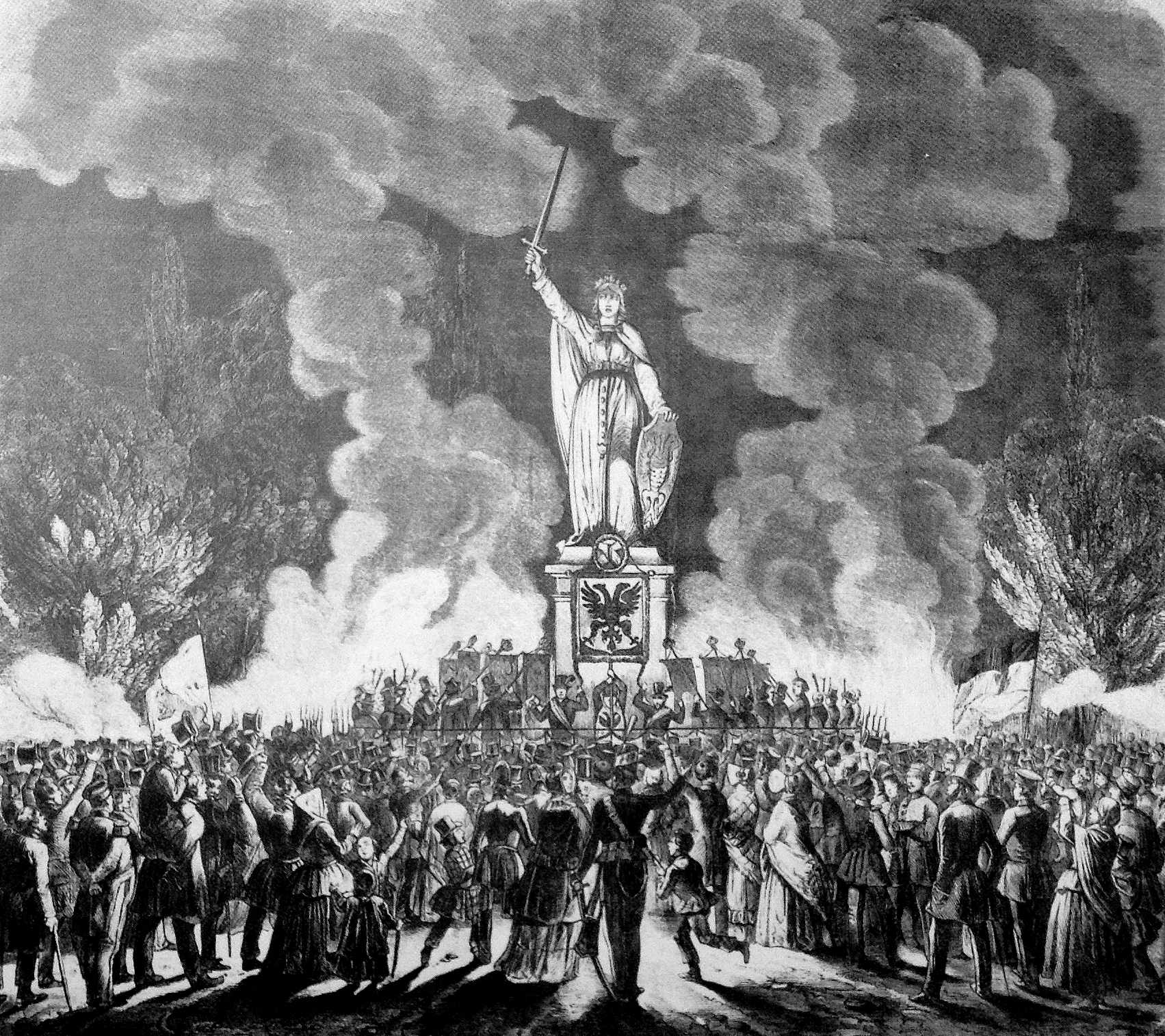
Contemporary illustration of the Statue of Germania during the Fest der Deutschen Einheit on August 6, 1848.

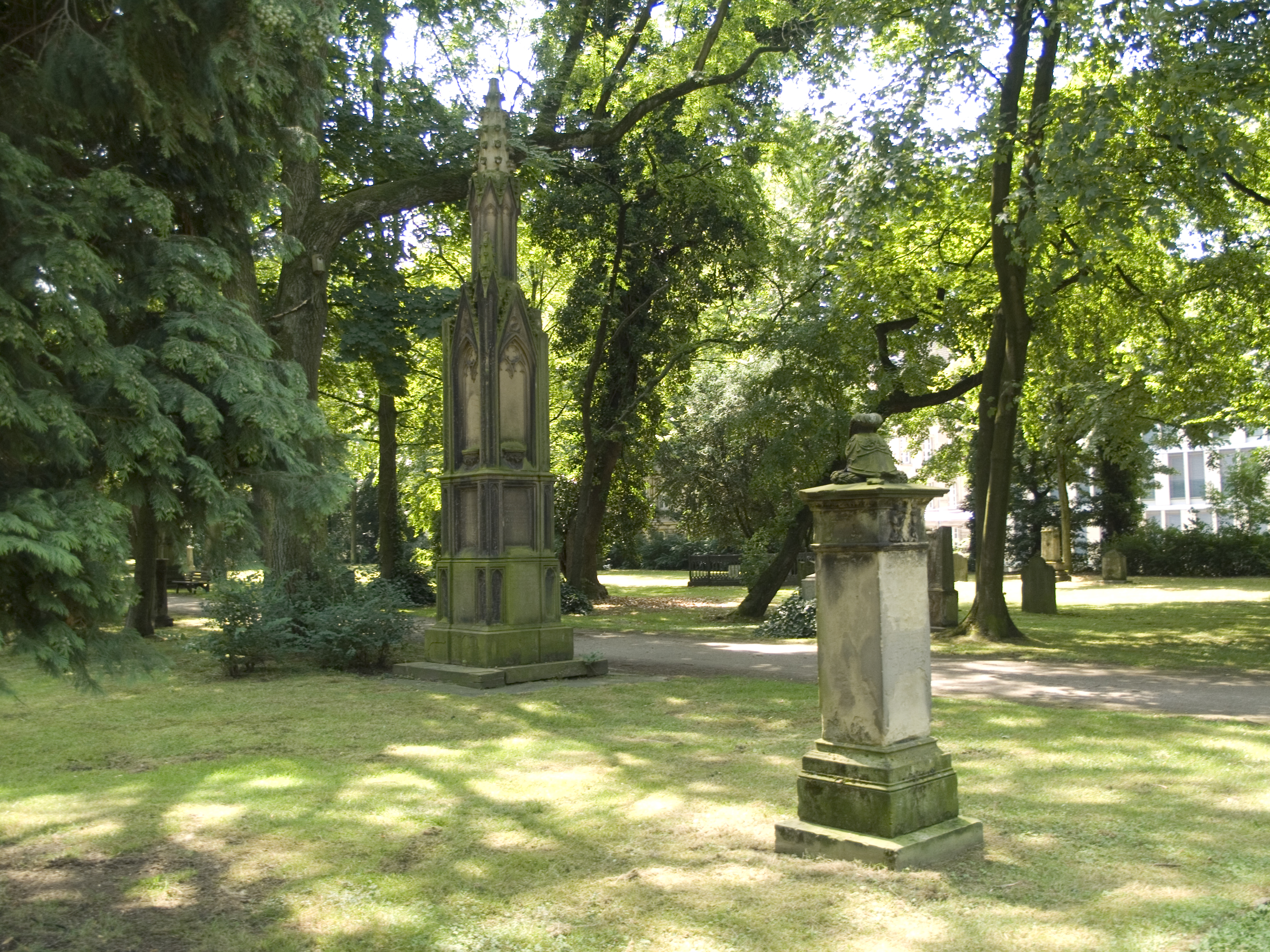
Jesuiten-Monument at the Golzheimer Friedhof (on the left)

Born in Ovelgönne in the Duchy of Oldenburg, Meinardus' life and work remain largely under-researched. In 1848, he served as the executive sculptor for a monumental statue of Germania made of wood, cardboard, and canvas. The statue was designed by Düsseldorf painter Karl Ferdinand Sohn for the Fest der Deutschen Einheit (Festival for German Unity) which was held that year on August 6 at Friedrichsplatz in Düsseldorf. Along with painters from the Düsseldorf school of painting, Meinardus was one of the founding members of the progressive art association Malkasten, which they established on the night of the celebration.

Meinardus resided in Düsseldorf's Altstadt, and was a Protestant. In the early 1830s, he opened his sculpture workshop at 441 Bolkerstraße and advertised his several years of study at the Kunstakademie and the certificates he obtained from the academy.

Meinardus primarily focused on creating sacred art, particularly gravestones. He often collaborated with sculptors and architects who provided designs, such as Julius Bayerle and Johann Peter Götting, both sculptors, and the architect Johannes Kühlwetter. Some of his works can be found in the Golzheim cemetery. The prominent sculptural piece in the cemetery is the high cross, architecturally designed by Johannes Kühlwetter, executed by Meinardus, and adorned with figures of Christ and Mary by Götting and Bayerle respectively. This cross was erected in 1850 and was relocated to the Millionenhügel (Millionaires' Hill) of Düsseldorf North Cemetery in 1905 during the construction of Klever Straße, which cut through the cemetery at its original location. Another significant collaboration between Kühlwetter and Meinardus resulted in the 1843 Jesuit Monument, a communal grave featuring a stele in the form of a Neogothic pinnacle made of sandstone. It commemorates the clergy of the Society of Jesus which was active in Prussian Düsseldorf at the Church of St. Andreas.

Meinardus died in 1871 at the age of 66 in Düsseldorf. He was buried with his wife Luise, née Dallemscheid (1812–1868), in the Golzheim cemetery.

Following Meinardus' death, his workshop was taken up by his son Alexander Meinardus (23 July 1843 - 23 June 1891) and later by his grandson Paul, who continued to sign under the name 'Dietrich Meinardus'. Another grandson grandson of Meinardus, Siegfried (1874–1933), also went on to become a sculptor.
