= Strike a pose =

Strike a pose or variant, may refer to:

== Music ==
- 'Strike a Pose', a lyric from the 1990 Madonna song "Vogue" (Madonna song)
- "What It Is (Strike a Pose)" (song; a.k.a. "Strike a Pose"), a 2008 song by Lil Mama off the album VYP
- "Strike a Pose" (Namie Amuro song), a 2017 song by Namie Amuro off the single Just You and I
- "Strike a Pose" (Young T & Bugsey song), a 2019 song by Young T & Bugsey off the album Plead the 5th

== Television ==
- "Strike a Pose" (episode), a 2013 TV episode of Perfect Score
- "Strike a Pose" (episode), a 2017 TV episode of Spartan: Ultimate Team Challenge
- "Strike a Pose!" (episode), a 2021 TV episode of Germany's Next Topmodel (season 16)

== Videogaming ==
- 'Strike a Pose', a game mode from the videogame Just Dance (video game)
- 'Strike a Pose', a game mode from the videogame Boogie (video game)
- "Strike a Pose", a mini-game from the videogame Dance Central 3

== Other uses ==
- 'strike a pose', a command in Vogueing from the Vogue (dance)
- Strike a Pose (film), a 2016 documentary film about Madonna's concert tour "Blonde Ambition"
- Catwalk: Strike a Pose (book), a novel in the Catwalk novel series by Deborah Gregory

== See also ==
- Striking Poses (film), a 1999 U.S. film
- Strike (disambiguation)
- Pose (disambiguation)
