= Ludwig Pose =

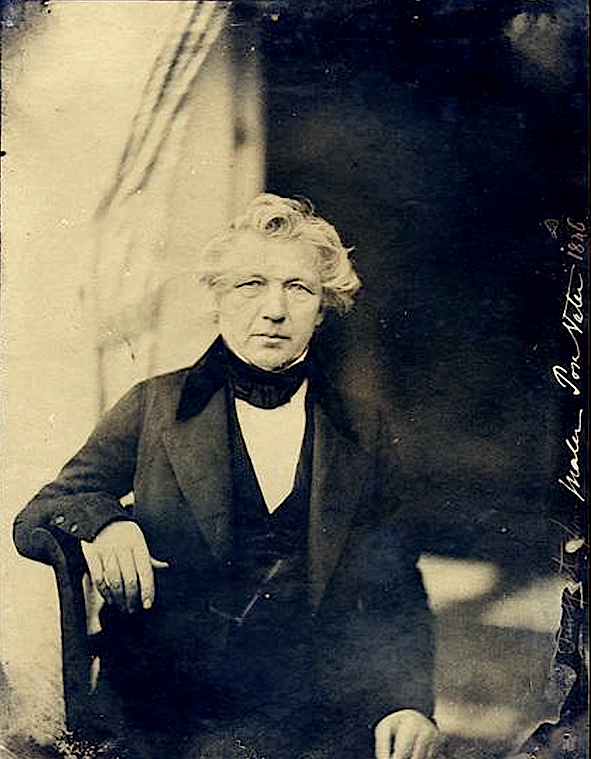
Ludwig Pose (1848)

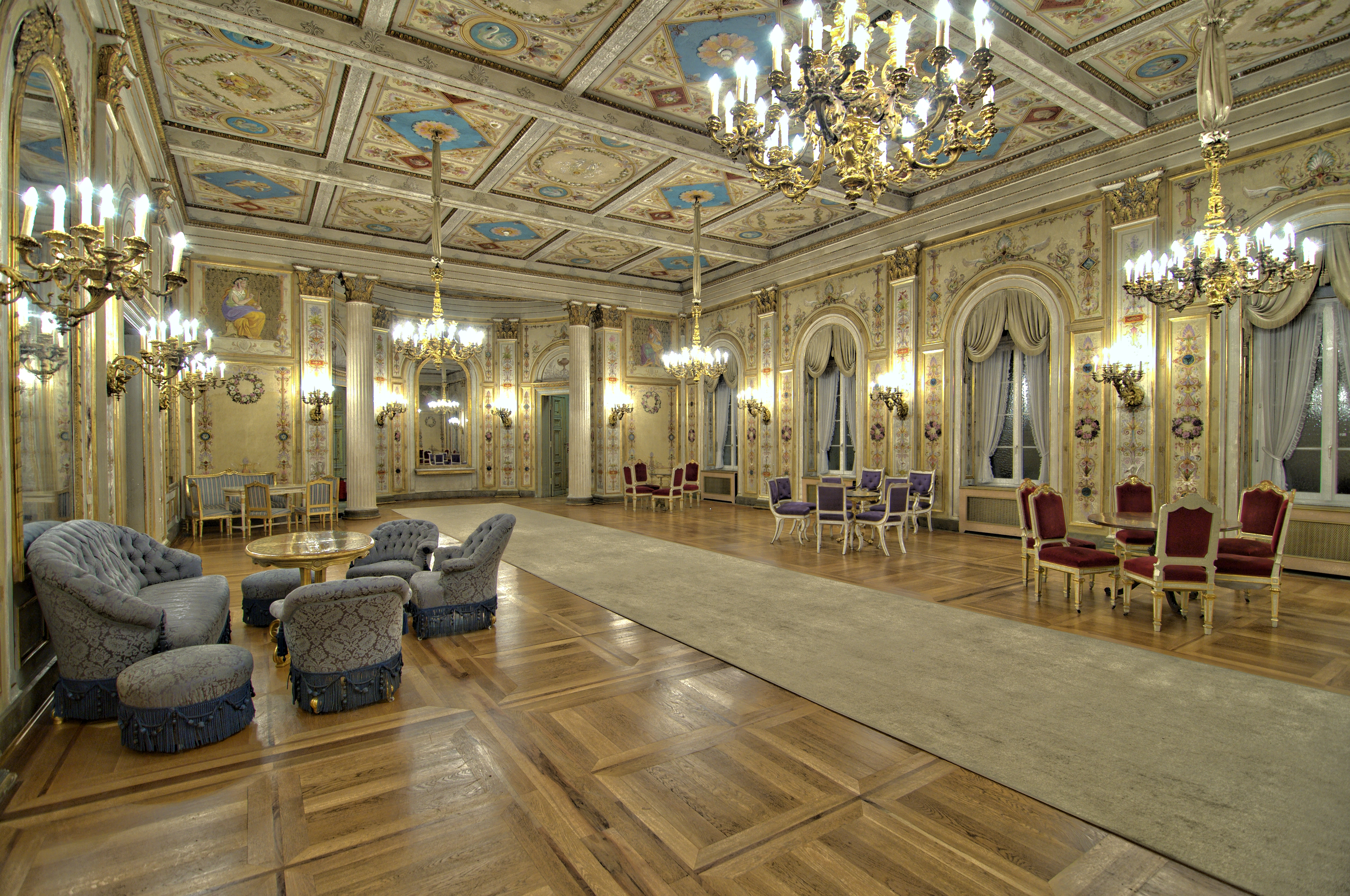
Concert Hall in the Wiesbaden City Palace

Johannes Andreas Ludwig Pose (8 December 1786, Berlin - 28 April 1877, Frankfurt am Main) was a German decorative painter in the Classical style.

== Biography ==
He was the eldest son born to Unteroffizier Johann Ferdinand Pose, originally from Kotzen and his wife, Luise Dorothea née Thiele. Several of his younger brothers became well known; including Friedrich Pose (1793–1870), also a decorative painter, and Eduard Pose (1803–1873), a theater manager.

His displays of artistic talent led to an enrollment at the Berliner Kunstakademie. His primary instructor there was Johann Wilhelm Meil, a landscape and flower painter. Sometime in the 1800s, he went to Düsseldorf, where he first began working as a decorative painter. He worked for both noble and middle-class families, throughout the region. He also ran a small shop that sold art materials. In 1809, he married Barbara Gerhards (1788–1835). They had a daughter, Elise (1810–1894), who would marry the architect, Max Joseph Custodis; and a son, Eduard Wilhelm, who became a landscape painter associated with the Düsseldorfer Malerschule.

He often worked together with the architect, Adolph von Vagedes. This resulted in his first major commission; the auditorium of the Theater Aachen (1823). His largest and best known projects were at the Wiesbaden City Palace, where he worked from 1839 to 1842, and again in 1851. His decorations featured a wide variety of arabesques, flowers, butterflies, birds and other small animals. He was also consulted when the furniture was selected for the salons.

Several of his apprentices went on to become familiar artists; including Ernst Willers and Julius Rollmann, as well as his son Eduard. In 1845, he decided to relocate to Frankfurt am Main, where he lived with Eduard and his wife Pauline. He lived in Wiesbaden from 1860 to 1874, when he went back to live with Eduard, who was then a widower. He died there three years later.

== Sources ==
- Rolf Bidlingmaier: "Ludwig Pose (1786–1877). Ein deutscher Dekorationsmaler des Klassizismus", In: Denkmalpflege & Kulturgeschichte. Vol.4, 2012, pp.17–26
- "Pose, Ludwig". In: Hans Vollmer (Ed.): Allgemeines Lexikon der Bildenden Künstler von der Antike bis zur Gegenwart, Vol.27: Piermaria–Ramsdell. E. A. Seemann, Leipzig 1933, pg.294
