= German Confederation =

Association of German states (1815–1866)

Coordinates: 50.115°N 8.680°E

German Confederation Deutscher Bund
- 1815–1848; 1850–1866
- Coat of arms

- The German Confederation in 1816

- States part of the German Confederation, 1816–1866
- Status: Confederation
- Capital: Frankfurt
- Common languages: German; Low German; Czech; Slovene; Polish; Limburgish and others
- Religion: Catholic, Protestant
- Head of the Präsidialmacht Austria
  - 1815–1835: Francis I
  - 1835–1848: Ferdinand I
  - 1850–1866: Franz Joseph I
- Legislature: Federal Convention
- History
  - Dissolution of the Holy Roman Empire: 6 August 1806
  - German campaign: 17 March 1813
  - Collapse of Confederation of the Rhine: 18 October 1813
  - Constitution adopted: 8 June 1815
  - Final Act of the Ministerial Conferences: 15 May 1820
  - German Revolutions: 13 March 1848
  - Punctation of Olmütz: 29 November 1850
  - Austro-Prussian War: 14 June 1866
  - North German Confederation Treaty: 18 August 1866
  - Peace of Prague: 23 August 1866
- Currency: Reichsthaler (to 1857); Conventionsthaler (to 1857); Vereinsthaler (from 1857)
Preceded by
Holy Roman Empire
Confederation of the Rhine
Kingdom of Prussia (territories in HRE until 1806 or listed below only)
Lauenburg-Bütow (Province of Pomerania)
Draheim (Province of Pomerania)
Province of Limburg (1815–1839)
Austrian Empire (territories in HRE until 1806 or listed below only)
Duchy of Oświęcim (after 1818)
Duchy of Zator (after 1818)
German Empire (1848–1849)
Succeeded by
German Empire (1848–1849)
Duchy of Oświęcim (after 1850)
Duchy of Zator (after 1850)
Following dissolution: North German Confederation
Austria as a whole
Kingdom of Bavaria
Kingdom of Württemberg
Grand Duchy of Baden
Duchy of Limburg (1839–1867)
Grand Duchy of Luxembourg as a whole
Principality of Liechtenstein
Grand Duchy of Hesse

The German Confederation (German: Deutscher Bund [ˈdɔʏtʃɐ ˈbʊnt]) was an association of 39 predominantly German-speaking sovereign states in Central Europe from 1815 to 1866. (Note: The German Confederation did not include German-speaking lands in the eastern portion of the Kingdom of Prussia (East Prussia and parts of West Prussia and Posen), the German-speaking cantons of Switzerland (including a third of majority francophone Fribourg and Valais), Alsace and a north-eastern strip of Lorraine in France, and southern portions of Schleswig (Kingdom of Denmark).) It was created by the Congress of Vienna to replace the Holy Roman Empire, which dissolved in 1806 as a result of the Napoleonic Wars.

The Confederation had only one organ, the Bundesversammlung, or Federal Convention (also Federal Assembly or Confederate Diet). The Convention consisted of the representatives of the member states. The most important issues had to be decided unanimously. The Convention was presided over by the representative of Austria, but this was a formality, as the Confederation had no head of state, since it was not a state.

The Confederation was a strong alliance among its member states because federal law was superior to state law. (The decisions of the Federal Convention were binding for the member states.) Additionally, the Confederation had been established for eternity and was impossible to dissolve (legally), with no member states able to leave it, and no new member able to join without universal consent in the Federal Convention. But the Confederation was weakened by its very structure and member states, partly because its most important decisions required unanimity and the purpose of the Confederation was limited to security matters. Moreover, the functioning of the Confederation depended on the cooperation of the two most populous member states, Austria and Prussia, which were often in opposition.

The German revolutions of 1848–1849, motivated by liberal, democratic, socialist, and nationalist sentiments, attempted to transform the Confederation into a unified German federal state with a liberal constitution (usually called the Frankfurt Constitution in English). The Federal Convention dissolved on 12 July 1848 but was reestablished in 1850 after the revolutions had been crushed by Austria, Prussia, Russia and other states.

The Confederation dissolved after the victory of the Kingdom of Prussia over the Austrian Empire in the Austro-Prussian War of 1866. The dispute over which country would dominate the German states ended in Prussia's favour, leading to the creation of the North German Confederation under Prussian leadership in 1867. A number of south German states remained independent until they joined the North German Confederation during the Franco-Prussian War. After the German victory, the Confederation was renamed and proclaimed as the German Empire in 1871. It unified Germany (aside from Austria), with the Prussian king as emperor (Kaiser).

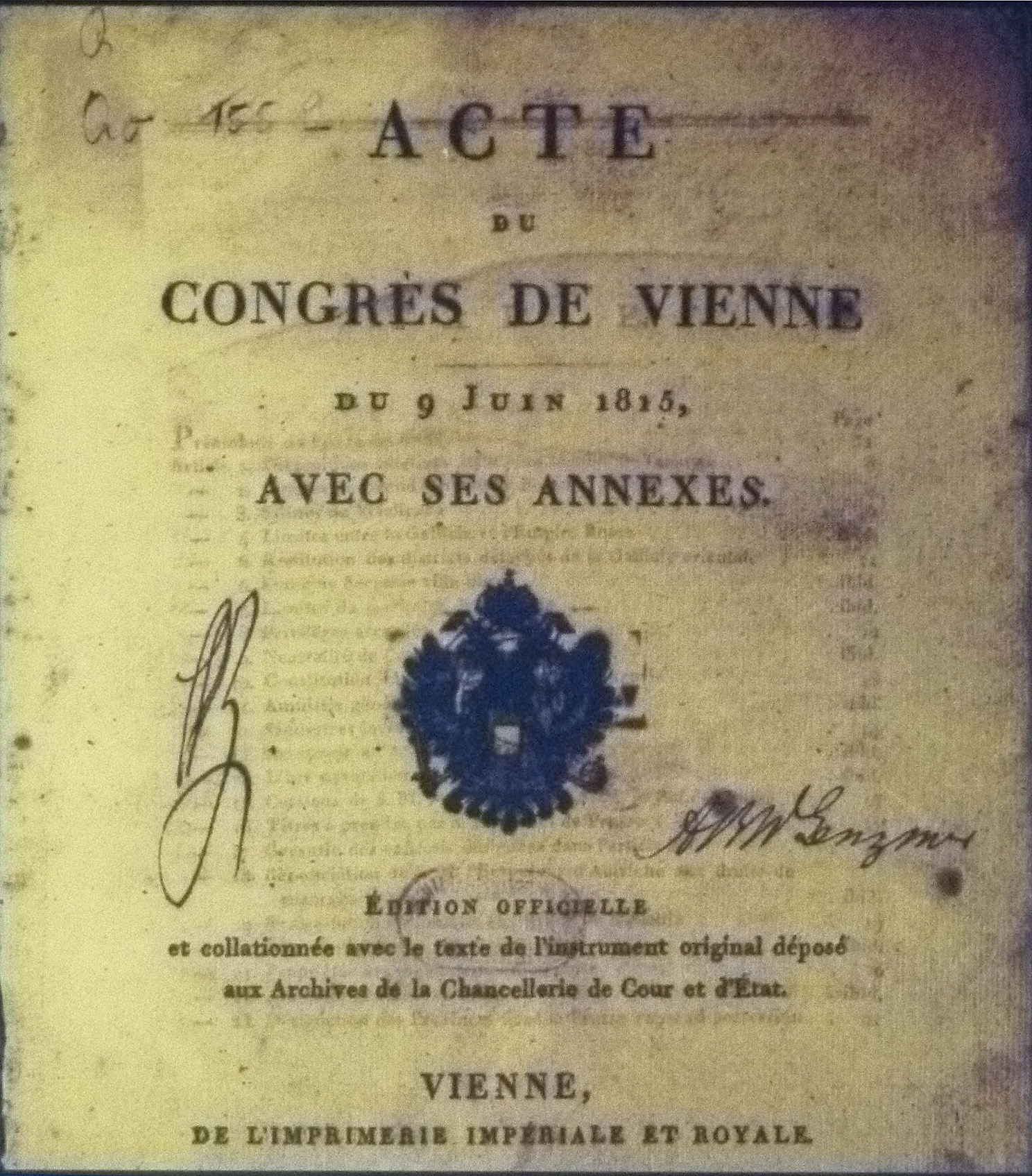
Frontispiece of the Acts of the Congress of Vienna

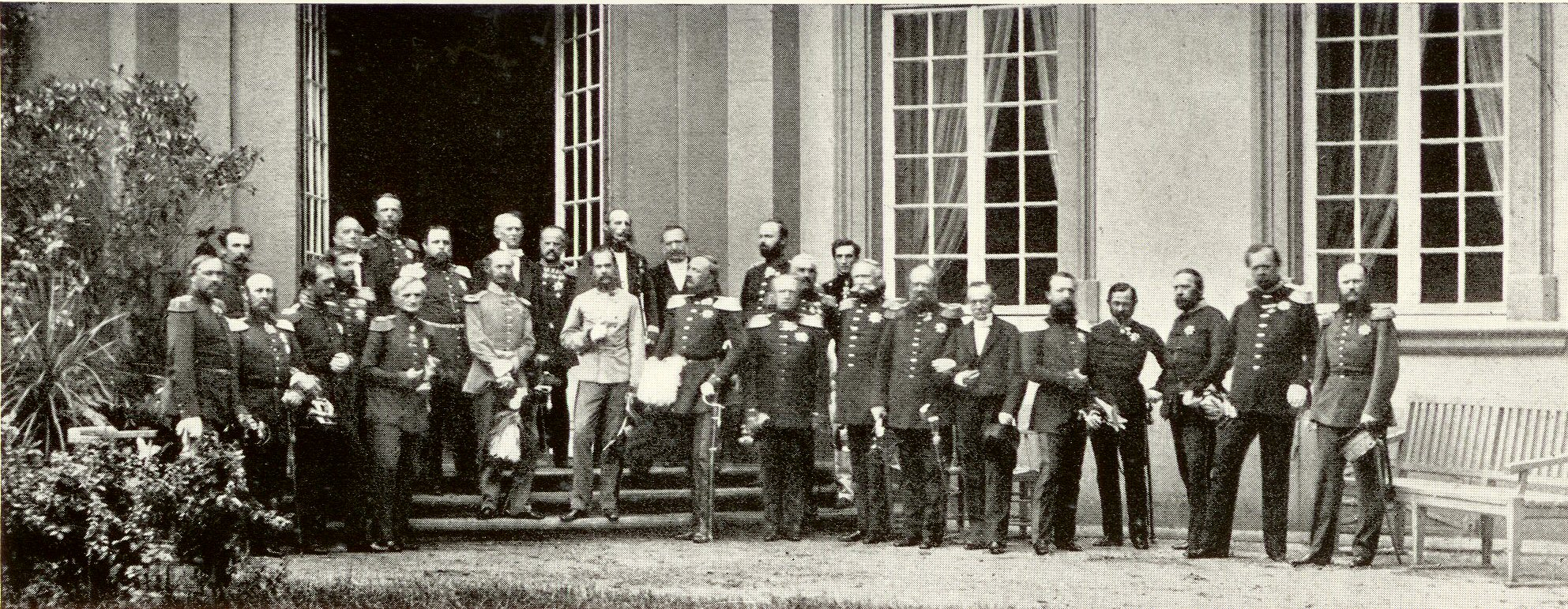
Monarchs of the member states of the German Confederation (with the exception of the Prussian king) meeting at Frankfurt in 1863

Most historians consider the Confederation to have been weak and ineffective, as well as an obstacle to the creation of a German nation-state. This weakness was part of its design, as the European Great Powers, including Prussia and especially Austria, did not want it to become a nation-state. But the Confederation was not a loose tie between the German states, as it was impossible to leave, and as Confederation law stood above the law of the aligned states. Its constitutional weakness lay in the principle of unanimity in the Diet and the limits of the Confederation's scope: it was essentially a military alliance to defend Germany against external attacks and internal riots. The War of 1866 proved its ineffectiveness, as it was unable to combine the federal troops to fight the Prussian secession.

== History ==
=== Background ===
The War of the Third Coalition lasted from about 1803 to 1806. Following defeat at the Battle of Austerlitz by the French under Napoleon in December 1805, Francis II abdicated as Holy Roman Emperor on 6 August 1806, thus dissolving the Empire. In the aftermath of the Treaty of Pressburg Napoleon created the Confederation of the Rhine in July 1806, joining 16 of France's allies among the German states (including Bavaria and Württemberg). After the Battle of Jena–Auerstedt of October 1806 in the War of the Fourth Coalition, various other German states, including Saxony and Westphalia, also joined the Confederation. Only Austria, Prussia, Danish Holstein, Swedish Pomerania, and the French-occupied Principality of Erfurt stayed outside the Confederation of the Rhine. The War of the Sixth Coalition from 1812 to winter 1814 saw Napoleon's defeat and Germany's liberation. In June 1814, the German patriot Heinrich vom Stein created the Central Managing Authority for Germany (Zentralverwaltungsbehörde) in Frankfurt to replace the defunct Confederation of the Rhine, but plenipotentiaries gathered at the Congress of Vienna were determined to create a weaker union of German states than Stein envisaged.

=== Establishment and member states ===
The German Confederation was established by the 20-article 9th Act of the Congress of Vienna on 8 June 1815, after being alluded to in Article 6 of the 1814 Treaty of Paris that ended the War of the Sixth Coalition. The Confederation's final organizational structure and procedures were formally set forth by a more extensive second treaty, the 65-article Final Act of the Ministerial Conferences to Complete and Consolidate the Organization of the German Confederation, which was signed by the parties on 15 May 1820 and ratified by the Confederation on 8 June.

Thirty-nine states participated in the Confederation's June 1815 founding, with two additions by September. After 1815, only two additional territories were added. The Landgraviate of Hesse-Homburg joined in 1817. In 1839, as compensation to the Netherlands for the loss of part of its province of Luxemburg to Belgium, the Duchy of Limburg was created and was admitted to the Confederation. Over the course of the Confederation's 51-year existence, the number of member states gradually diminished, due to the extinction of ruling houses resulting in inheritances and consolidation of territories. Thirty-four member states remained at the time of the final dissolution by the Peace of Prague in August 1866.

Member states
Category and country	Flag	Capital	Notes
Empire (Kaisertum)
Austria		Vienna	Only included the Lands of the Bohemian Crown – Bohemia, Moravia and Austrian Silesia – and Austrian lands – Austria, Carinthia, Carniola and the Littoral except Istria; the Duchies of Auschwitz and Zator, parts of the Kingdom of Galicia and Lodomeria, were only included from 1818 to 1850
Kingdoms (Königreiche)
Bavaria		Munich	
Hanover		Hanover	Ruled by the king of the United Kingdom of Great Britain and Ireland in personal union as its king until 1837. Annexed by Prussia 20 September 1866
Prussia		Berlin	The Province of Prussia and the Grand Duchy of Posen were only included from 1848 to 1851
Saxony		Dresden	
Württemberg		Stuttgart	Joined 1 September 1815
Electorate (Kurfürstentum)
Hesse		Kassel	Also known as Hesse-Kassel; annexed by Prussia 20 September 1866
Grand Duchies (Großherzogtümer)
Baden		Karlsruhe	Joined 26 July 1815
Hesse and by Rhine		Darmstadt	Also known as Hesse-Darmstadt
Luxembourg		Luxembourg	Ruled in personal union by the king of the Netherlands as its grand duke
Mecklenburg-Schwerin		Schwerin	
Mecklenburg-Strelitz		Neustrelitz	
Oldenburg		Oldenburg	
Saxe-Weimar-Eisenach		Weimar	
Duchies (Herzogtümer)
Anhalt-Bernburg		Bernburg	Inherited by the duke of Anhalt-Dessau in August 1863
Anhalt-Dessau; Anhalt (from 1863)		Dessau	Renamed the Duchy of Anhalt in August 1863
Anhalt-Köthen		Köthen	Inherited by the duke of Anhalt-Dessau in November 1847; ruled in personal union until merged with Anhalt-Dessau in May 1853
Brunswick		Brunswick	
Holstein		Glückstadt	Ruled by the king of Denmark in personal union; after defeat in the Second Schleswig War, Denmark ceded it and the Duchy of Schleswig jointly to Austria and Prussia on 30 October 1864; Holstein remained a member of the Confederation but Schleswig did not become a member; both duchies were annexed by Prussia on 24 December 1866
Limburg		Maastricht	Joined on 5 September 1839 and ruled in personal union by the king of the Netherlands as its duke
Nassau		Wiesbaden	Annexed by Prussia 20 September 1866
Saxe-Coburg-Saalfeld		Coburg	Became Saxe-Coburg and Gotha in 1826
Saxe-Gotha-Altenburg		Gotha	Partitioned and renamed Saxe-Altenburg in 1826
Saxe-Hildburghausen		Hildburghausen	Partitioned and disestablished when its ruler became the duke of Saxe-Altenburg in 1826
Saxe-Lauenburg		Ratzeburg	Ruled by the king of Denmark in personal union as its duke; by the Treaty of Vienna (1864), King Christian IX of Denmark abdicated as duke and ceded the duchy jointly to Prussia and Austria; by the Gastein Convention, Austria ceded its claim to Prussia; in September 1865, William I of Prussia acceded as duke in personal union
Saxe-Meiningen		Meiningen	
Principalities (Fürstentümer)
Hohenzollern-Hechingen		Hechingen	Annexed by Prussia in 1850
Hohenzollern-Sigmaringen		Sigmaringen	Annexed by Prussia in 1850
Liechtenstein		Vaduz	
Lippe		Detmold	
Nassau-Weilburg		Weilburg	Inherited the Duchy of Nassau on 24 March 1816
Nassau-Usingen		Usingen	Inherited the Duchy of Nassau on 24 March 1816
Reuss-Ebersdorf		Ebersdorf	Inherited by Reuss-Schleiz in October 1848
Reuss-Greiz		Greiz	Commonly known as Reuss Elder Line from 1848
Reuss-Lobenstein		Lobenstein	Inherited by Reuss-Ebersdorf in May 1824
Reuss-Schleiz; Reuss-Gera (from 1848)		Schleiz; Gera (from 1848)	Commonly known as Reuss Younger Line from 1848
Schaumburg-Lippe		Bückeburg	
Schwarzburg-Rudolstadt		Rudolstadt	
Schwarzburg-Sondershausen		Sondershausen	
Waldeck and Pyrmont		Arolsen	
Landgraviate (Landgrafschaft)
Hesse-Homburg		Bad Homburg	Joined 7 July 1817; inherited by Hesse and by Rhine in March 1866; annexed by Prussia 20 September 1866
Free Cities (Freie Stadt)
Bremen		Bremen	
Frankfurt		Frankfurt am Main	Annexed by Prussia 20 September 1866
Hamburg		Hamburg	
Lübeck		Lübeck	

=== Summary of membership changes ===
Year	Additions	Losses	Membership
1815	39 original members		39
1815	Baden and Württemberg		41
1816		Nassau-Weilburg inherits Nassau-Usingen (Duchy of Nassau)	40
1817	Hesse-Homburg		41
1824		Reuss-Ebersdorf inherits Reuss-Lobenstein	40
1826		Reorganization of the Ernestine duchies: Saxe-Altenburg-Gotha is partitioned; Saxe-Hildburghausen inherits Altenburg and becomes Saxe-Altenburg; Saxe-Coburg-Saalfeld obtains Gotha and becomes Saxe-Coburg-Gotha; Hildburgshausen and Saalfeld are ceded to Saxe-Meiningen	39
1839	Limburg		40
1848		Reuss-Schleiz inherits Reuss-Ebersdorf and becomes Reuss-Gera	39
1850		Prussia inherits Hohenzollern-Hechingen and Hohenzollern-Sigmaringen	37
1853		Anhalt-Dessau annexes Anhalt-Köthen which it has ruled in personal union since 1847	36
1863		Anhalt-Dessau inherits Anhalt-Bernburg and becomes Anhalt	35
1866		Hesse-Darmstadt inherits Hesse-Homburg	34

== Federal Convention ==
Chart: functioning of the German Confederation

The Federal Convention, as described in the basic law of 15 May 1820, was the sole constitutional institution of the Confederation. This was not an elected assembly, rather its members were appointed plenipotentiaries from the member states. The Convention was permanently presided over by the representative of Austria. Plenary sessions where larger states had more votes than smaller ones were only called to discuss important issues such as a declaration of war or ratification of a peace treaty, and required a two-thirds majority (Article XII). Constitutional issues concerning alterations to the fundamental laws, admission of new member states, or religious issues had to be decided unanimously (Article XIII). Consequently, even the smallest states held an effective veto in these areas. Most routine matters were decided by a majority vote of the smaller Engerer Rat, or inner council (Article XI). This comprised 17 votes distributed in the following manner:

- The Austrian Empire and the Kingdom of Prussia, as the Confederation's largest and most powerful members, each had one vote, even though large parts of both were excluded from the Confederation because they had not been part of the Holy Roman Empire.
- Six other major states also had one vote each: the Kingdom of Bavaria, the Kingdom of Saxony, the Kingdom of Württemberg, the Electorate of Hesse, the Grand Duchy of Baden, and the Grand Duchy of Hesse and by Rhine.
- Three foreign monarchs ruled in personal union over five member states of the Confederation and each monarch had one vote: the king of Denmark as duke of Holstein and duke of Saxe-Lauenburg; the king of the Netherlands as grand duke of Luxembourg and (from 1839) duke of Limburg; and the king of the United Kingdom of Great Britain and Ireland (until 1837) as king of Hanover.
- The four free cities of Bremen, Frankfurt, Hamburg, and Lübeck shared one vote.
- The remaining states shared a total of five votes, with one vote for each of the following groups:
  - Brunswick and Nassau
  - Mecklenburg-Schwerin and Mecklenburg-Strelitz
  - Saxe-Coburg-Saalfeld, Saxe-Gotha-Altenburg, Saxe-Hildburghausen, Saxe-Meiningen and Saxe-Weimar-Eisenach
  - Anhalt-Bernburg, Anhalt-Dessau, Anhalt-Köthen, Oldenburg, Schwarzburg-Rudolstadt and Schwarzburg-Sondershausen
  - Hesse-Homberg, Hohenzollern-Hechingen, Hohenzollern-Sigmaringen, Liechtenstein, Lippe, Reuss (Elder Branch), Reuss (Younger Branch), Schaumburg-Lippe and Waldeck

== Military ==
=== Activities ===
The rules of the Confederation provided for three different types of military interventions:

- the federal war (Bundeskrieg) against an external enemy who attacks federal territory,
- the federal execution (Bundesexekution) against the government of a member state that violates federal law,
- the federal intervention (Bundesintervention) supporting a government that is under pressure of a popular uprising.

Other military conflicts were foreign to the confederation (bundesfremd). An example is Austria's oppression of the uprising in Northern Italy in 1848 and 1849, as these Austrian territories lay outside of the confederation's borders.

During the existence of the Confederation, there was only one federal war: the war against Denmark beginning with the Schleswig-Holstein uprising in 1848 (the First Schleswig War). The conflict became a federal war when the Bundestag demanded that Denmark withdraw its troops from Schleswig (12 April) and recognized the revolution of Schleswig-Holstein (22 April). The confederation transformed into the German Empire of 1848. Prussia was de facto the most important member state conducting the war for Germany.

There are several examples of federal executions and especially federal interventions. In 1863, the Confederation ordered the execution of the duke of Holstein (the Danish king). Federal troops occupied Holstein, which was a member state. After this, Austria and Prussia declared war on Denmark, the Second Schleswig War (or Deutsch-Dänischer Krieg in German). As Schleswig and Denmark were not member states, this war was foreign to the Confederation, which took no part in it.

A federal intervention confronted for example the raid of the revolutionaries in Baden in April 1848.

In June 1866, the Federal Convention took measures against Prussia. This decision was technically not a federal execution for lack of time to observe the actual procedure. Prussia had violated, according to the majority of the convention, federal law by sending its troops to Holstein. The decision led to the Austro-Prussian War in summer 1866 that ended with the dissolution of the confederation.

=== Armed forces ===
The German Federal Army (Deutsches Bundesheer) was supposed to collectively defend the German Confederation from external enemies, primarily France. Successive laws passed by the Confederate Diet set the form and function of the army, as well as contribution limits of the member states. The Diet had the power to declare war and was responsible for appointing a supreme commander of the army and commanders of the individual army corps. This made mobilization extremely slow and added a political dimension to the army. In addition, the Diet oversaw the construction and maintenance of several German Federal Fortresses and collected funds annually from the member states for this purpose.

Projections of army strength were published in 1835, but the work of forming the Army Corps did not commence until 1840 as a consequence of the Rhine crisis. Money for the fortresses were determined by an act of the Confederate Diet in that year. By 1846, Luxemburg still had not formed its own contingent, and Prussia was rebuffed for offering to supply 1,450 men to garrison the Luxemburg fortress that should have been supplied by Waldeck and the two Lippes. In that same year, it was decided that a common symbol for the Federal Army should be the old Imperial two-headed eagle, but without crown, scepter, or sword, as any of those devices encroached on the individual sovereignty of the states. King Frederick William IV of Prussia was among those who derided the "disarmed imperial eagle" as a national symbol.

The German Federal Army was divided into ten Army Corps (later expanded to include a Reserve Corps). The Army Corps were not exclusive to the German Confederation but composed of the member states' armies, and did not include all of the armed forces of a state. For example, Prussia's army consisted of nine Army Corps but contributed only three to the German Federal Army.

The strength of the mobilized German Federal Army was projected to total 303,484 men in 1835 and 391,634 men in 1860, with the individual states providing the following figures:

State	Area [km^{2}]	Population (Note: For the year 1835.)	Matriculation class (Note: The matriculation class determined the percentage of expenditures for 1835.) (proportion of total)	Annual expenditures (in Austrian Gulden)	Army Corps	Troop Totals (Note: For the year 1860.)
Austrian Empire (Note: Not included Hungary, Transylvania, Galicia (but with Auschwitz and Zator), Dalmatia, Slavonia, Croatia and upper Italian lands apart from Trieste.)	(Note: federal share.) 197,573	10,086,900	31.4%	9,432,000	I, II, III	158,037
Kingdom of Prussia (Note: Without East Prussia, West Prussia, and Posen.)	185,496	9,957,000	26.5%	7,956,000	IV, V, VI	133,769
Kingdom of Bavaria	76,258	4,120,000	11.8%	3,540,000	VII	59,334
Kingdom of Hannover	38,452	1,549,000	4.3%	1,299,000	X (1st Div., part)	21,757
Kingdom of Württemberg	19,504	1,547,400	4.6%	1,389,000	VIII (1st Div.)	23,259
Kingdom of Saxony	14,993	1,480,000	4.0%	1,194,000	IX (1st Div.)	20,000
Grand Duchy of Baden	15,269	1,175,000	3.3%	993,000	VIII (2nd Div.)	16,667
Grand Duchy of Hesse-Darmstadt	7,680	720,000	2.2%	615,000	VIII (3rd Div., part)	10,325
Grand Duchy of Mecklenburg-Schwerin	13,304	455,000	1.2%	357,000	X (2nd Div., part)	5,967
Grand Duchy of Mecklenburg-Strelitz	2,929	85,000	0.2%	72,000	X (2nd Div., part)	1,197
Grand Duchy of Oldenburg	6,420	250,000	0.7%	219,000	X (2nd Div., part)	3,740
Grand Duchy of Luxemburg (with the Duchy of Limburg)	2,586	259,500	0.4%	120,000	IX (2nd Div., part)	2,706
Grand Duchy of Saxe-Weimar	3,593	233,814	0.7%	201,000	Reserve (part)	3,350
Electoral Hesse	9,581	629,000	1.9%	564,000	IX (2nd Div., part)	9,466
Duchy of Anhalt-Dessau	840	57,629	0.2%	57,000	Reserve (part)	1,422
Duchy of Anhalt-Köthen (Note: Inherited by the Duke of Anhalt-Dessau in 1847 and formally merged in 1853.)	727	36,000	0.1%	30,000	Reserve (part)	325 (Note: Figures for 1835; merged with Anhalt-Dessau army in 1847.)
Duchy of Anhalt-Bernburg (Note: Merged with Anhalt-Dessau in 1863.)	780	43,325	0.1%	36,000	Reserve (part)	616
Duchy of Brunswick	3,690	245,783	0.7%	20,000	X (1st Div., part)	3,493
Duchies of Holstein and Saxe-Lauenburg (Note: Troops were attached to the Danish army until 1864, as the King of Denmark was also Duke of both lands.)	9,580	450,000	0.1%	35,000	X (2nd Div., part)	6,000
Duchy of Nassau	4,700	360,000	1.0%	300,000	IX (2nd Div., part)	6,109
Duchy of Saxe-Altenburg	1,287	114,048	0.3%	99,000	Reserve (part)	1,638
Duchy of Saxe-Coburg-Gotha (Note: Gotha passed to Saxe-Coburg in 1826.)	2,688	156,639	0.4%	111,000	Reserve (part)	1,860
Duchy of Saxe-Hildburghausen (Note: Partitioned between Saxe-Coburg and Saxe-Meiningen in 1826.)	0	0	nil%	0	Reserve (part)	0 (Note: No figures reported before partition.)
Duchy of Saxe-Meiningen	2,293	136,000	0.4%	114,000	Reserve (part)	1,918
Principality of Hohenzollern-Sigmaringen	906	42,341	1.4%	420,000	VIII (3rd Div., part)	356 (Note: Figures for 1835; merged with Prussian army in 1850.)
Principality of Hohenzollern-Hechingen	236	17,000	0.1%	15,000	VIII (3rd Div., part)	155
Principality of Lippe-Detmold	1,133	77,500	0.2%	69,000	Reserve (part)	1,202
Principality of Schaumburg-Lippe	536	23,128	0.1%	21,000	Reserve (part)	350
Principality of Liechtenstein	159	5,800	nil%	6,000	Reserve (part)	91
Principality of Reuß elder line	316	24,500	0.1%	21,000	Reserve (part)	1,241
Principality of Reuß younger line	826	59,000	0.2%	51,000	Reserve (part)	see Reuß elder line
Principality of Schwarzburg-Rudolstadt	940	60,000	0.2%	54,000	Reserve (part)	899
Principality of Waldeck	1,121	56,000	0.2%	51,000	Reserve (part)	866
Principality of Schwarzburg-Sondershausen	862	51,767	0.2%	45,000	Reserve (part)	751
Landgraviate of Hessen-Homburg (Note: Merged with Grand Ducal Hesse in 1866.)	275	23,000	0.-%	21,000	Reserve (part)	333
Free City of Lübeck	298	45,600	0.1%	39,000	X (2nd Div., part)	669
Free City of Hamburg	410	154,000	0.4%	129,000	X (2nd Div., part)	2,163
Free City of Bremen	256	52,000	0.2%	48,000	X (2nd Div., part)	748
Free City of Frankfurt	101	54,000	0.2%	48,000	Reserve (part)	1,119

== Historical context ==
Between 1806 and 1815, Napoleon organized the German states, aside from Prussia and Austria, into the Confederation of the Rhine, but this collapsed after his defeats in 1812 to 1815. The German Confederation had roughly the same boundaries as the Empire at the time of the French Revolution (less what is now Belgium). It also kept intact most of Confederation's reconstituted member states and their boundaries. The member states, drastically reduced to 39 from more than 300 (see Kleinstaaterei) under the Holy Roman Empire, were recognized as fully sovereign. The members pledged themselves to mutual defense, and joint maintenance of the fortresses at Mainz, the city of Luxembourg, Rastatt, Ulm, and Landau.

The only organ of the Confederation was the Federal Assembly (officially Bundesversammlung, often called Bundestag), which consisted of the delegates of the states' governments. There was no head of state, but the Austrian delegate presided over the Assembly (according to the Bundesakte). Austria did not have extra powers, but consequently the Austrian delegate was called Präsidialgesandther and Austria the Präsidialmacht (presiding power). The Assembly met in Frankfurt.

The Confederation was enabled to accept and deploy ambassadors. It allowed ambassadors of the European powers to the Assembly, but rarely deployed ambassadors itself.

During the revolution of 1848/49 the Federal Assembly was inactive. It transferred its powers to the Provisorische Zentralgewalt, the revolutionary German Central Government of the Frankfurt National Assembly. After crushing the revolution and illegally disbanding the National Assembly, the Prussian King failed to create a German nation state by himself. The Federal Assembly was revived in 1850 on Austrian initiative, but only fully reinstalled in the summer of 1851.

Rivalry between Prussia and Austria grew, especially after 1859. The Confederation dissolved in 1866 after the Austro-Prussian War, and was succeeded in 1866 by the Prussian-dominated North German Confederation. Unlike the German Confederation, the North German Confederation was a true state. Its territory comprised the parts of the German Confederation north of the river Main, plus Prussia's eastern territories and the Duchy of Schleswig, but excluded Austria and the other southern German states.

Prussia's influence was widened by the Franco-Prussian War resulting in the proclamation of the German Empire at Versailles on 18 January 1871, which united the North German Federation with the southern German states. All the constituent states of the former German Confederation became part of the Kaiserreich in 1871, except Austria, Luxembourg, the Duchy of Limburg, and Liechtenstein.

== Impact of the French Revolution and the Napoleonic invasions ==
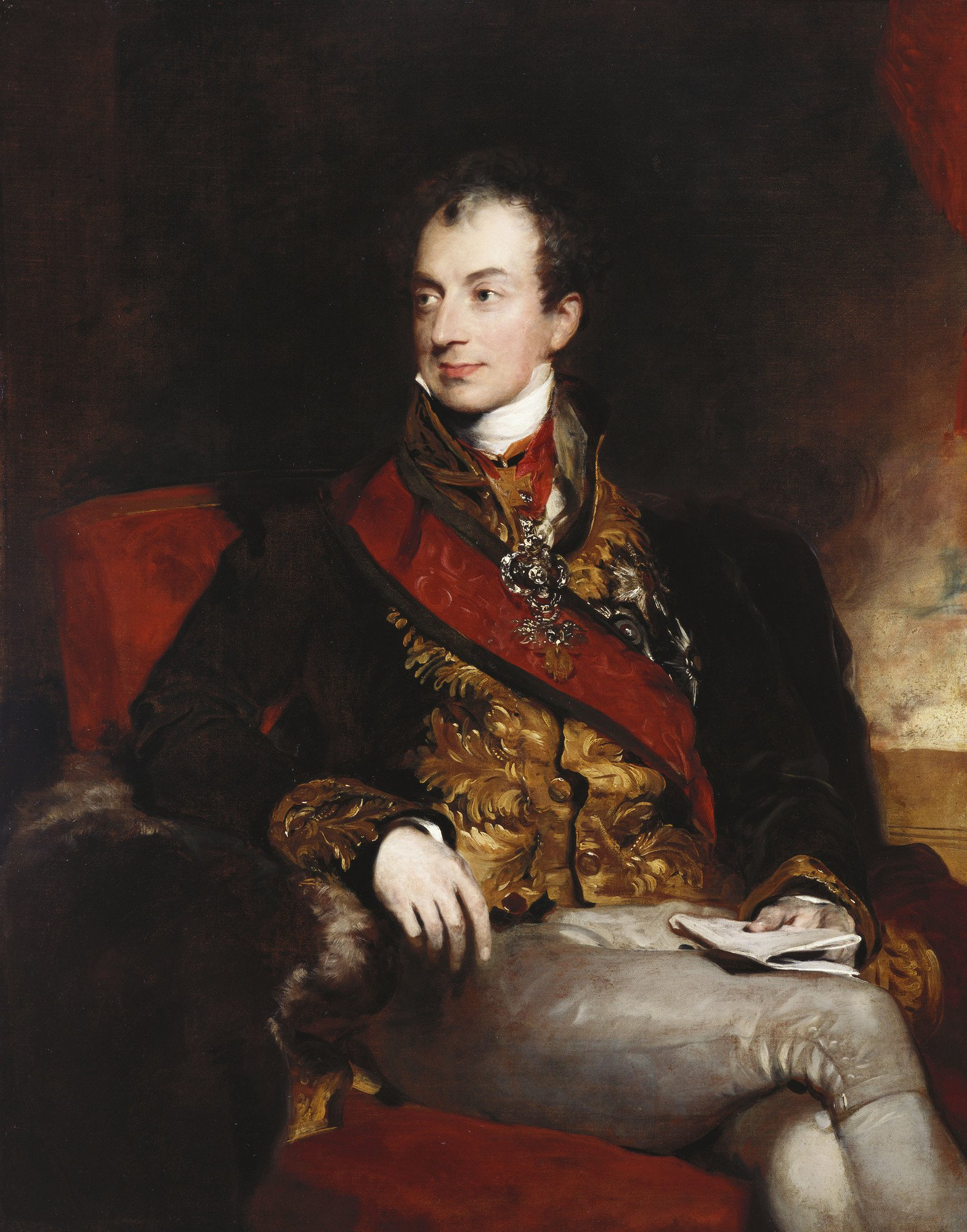
Austrian chancellor and foreign minister Klemens von Metternich dominated the German Confederation from 1815 until 1848.

The late 18th century was a period of political, economic, intellectual, and cultural reforms—the Enlightenment (represented by figures such as Locke, Rousseau, Voltaire, and Adam Smith), but also early Romanticism, climaxing with the French Revolution, where freedom of the individual and nation was asserted against privilege and custom. Representing a great variety of types and theories, they were largely a response to the disintegration of previous cultural patterns, coupled with new patterns of production, specifically the rise of industrial capitalism.

But Napoleon's defeat enabled conservative and reactionary regimes such as those of the Kingdom of Prussia, the Austrian Empire, and Tsarist Russia to survive, laying the groundwork for the Congress of Vienna and the alliance that strove to oppose radical demands for change ushered in by the French Revolution. With Austria's position on the continent now intact and ostensibly secure under its reactionary premier Klemens von Metternich, the Habsburg empire was a barrier to contain the emergence of Italian and German nation-states as well, in addition to containing France. But this reactionary balance of power, aimed at blocking German and Italian nationalism on the continent, was precarious.

After Napoleon's final defeat in 1815, the surviving member states of the defunct Holy Roman Empire joined to form the German Confederation (Deutscher Bund)—a rather loose organization, especially because the Austrian Empire and the Kingdom of Prussia each feared domination by the other.

In Prussia the Hohenzollern rulers forged a centralized state. By the time of the Napoleonic Wars, Prussia, grounded in the virtues of its established military aristocracy (the Junkers) and stratified by rigid hierarchical lines, had been surpassed militarily and economically by France. After 1807, Prussia's defeats by Napoleonic France highlighted the need for administrative, economic, and social reforms to improve the efficiency of the bureaucracy and encourage practical merit-based education. Inspired by the Napoleonic organization of German and Italian principalities, the Prussian Reform Movement led by Karl August von Hardenberg and Count Stein was conservative, enacted to preserve aristocratic privilege while modernizing institutions.

Outside Prussia, industrialization progressed slowly, hampered by political disunity, conflicts of interest between the nobility and merchants, and the continued existence of the guild system, which discouraged competition and innovation. While this kept the middle class at bay, affording the old order a measure of stability not seen in France, Prussia's vulnerability to Napoleon's military proved to many among the old order that a fragile, divided, and traditionalist Germany would be easy prey for its cohesive and industrializing neighbor.

The reforms laid the foundation for Prussia's future military might by professionalizing the military and decreeing universal military conscription. To industrialize Prussia within the framework of the old aristocratic institutions, land reforms were enacted to break the monopoly of the Junkers on land ownership, thereby also abolishing, among other things, the feudal practice of serfdom.

== Romanticism, nationalism, and liberalism in the Vormärz era ==
Although the forces the French Revolution unleashed were seemingly under control after the Vienna Congress, the conflict between conservative forces and liberal nationalists was only deferred. The era until the failed 1848 revolution, in which these tensions grew, is commonly called Vormärz ("pre-March"), in reference to the outbreak of riots in March 1848.

This conflict pitted the forces of the old order against those inspired by the French Revolution and the Rights of Man. The breakdown of the competition was, roughly, the emerging capitalist bourgeoisie and petit-bourgeoisie (engaged mostly in commerce, trade, and industry), and the growing (and increasingly radicalized) industrial working class; and the other side associated with landowning aristocracy or military aristocracy (the Junkers) in Prussia, the Habsburg monarchy in Austria, and the conservative notables of Germany's small princely states and city-states.

Meanwhile, demands for change from below had been fomenting due to the influence of the French Revolution. Throughout the German Confederation, Austrian influence was paramount, drawing the ire of the nationalist movements. Metternich considered nationalism, especially the nationalist youth movement, the most pressing danger: German nationalism might not only repudiate Austrian dominance of the Confederation, but also stimulate nationalist sentiment within the Austrian Empire itself. In a multi-national polyglot state in which Slavs and Magyars outnumbered the Germans, the prospects of Czech, Slovak, Hungarian, Polish, Serb, or Croatian sentiment along with middle class liberalism was certainly horrifying to the monarchist landed aristocracy.

Figures like August Heinrich Hoffmann von Fallersleben, Ludwig Uhland, Georg Herwegh, Heinrich Heine, Georg Büchner, Ludwig Börne, and Bettina von Arnim rose in the Vormärz era. Father Friedrich Jahn's gymnastic associations exposed middle-class German youth to nationalist and democratic ideas, which took the form of the nationalistic and liberal democratic college fraternities known as Burschenschaften. The 1817 Wartburg Festival celebrated Martin Luther as a proto-German nationalist, linking Lutheranism to German nationalism, and helping arouse religious sentiments for the cause of German nationhood. The festival culminated in the burning of several books and other items that symbolized reactionary attitudes. One was a book by August von Kotzebue. In 1819, Kotzebue was accused of spying for Russia and then murdered by a theological student, Karl Ludwig Sand, who was executed for the crime. Sand belonged to a militant nationalist faction of the Burschenschaften. Metternich used the murder as a pretext to issue the Carlsbad Decrees of 1819, which dissolved the Burschenschaften, cracked down on the liberal press, and seriously restricted academic freedom.

=== High culture ===
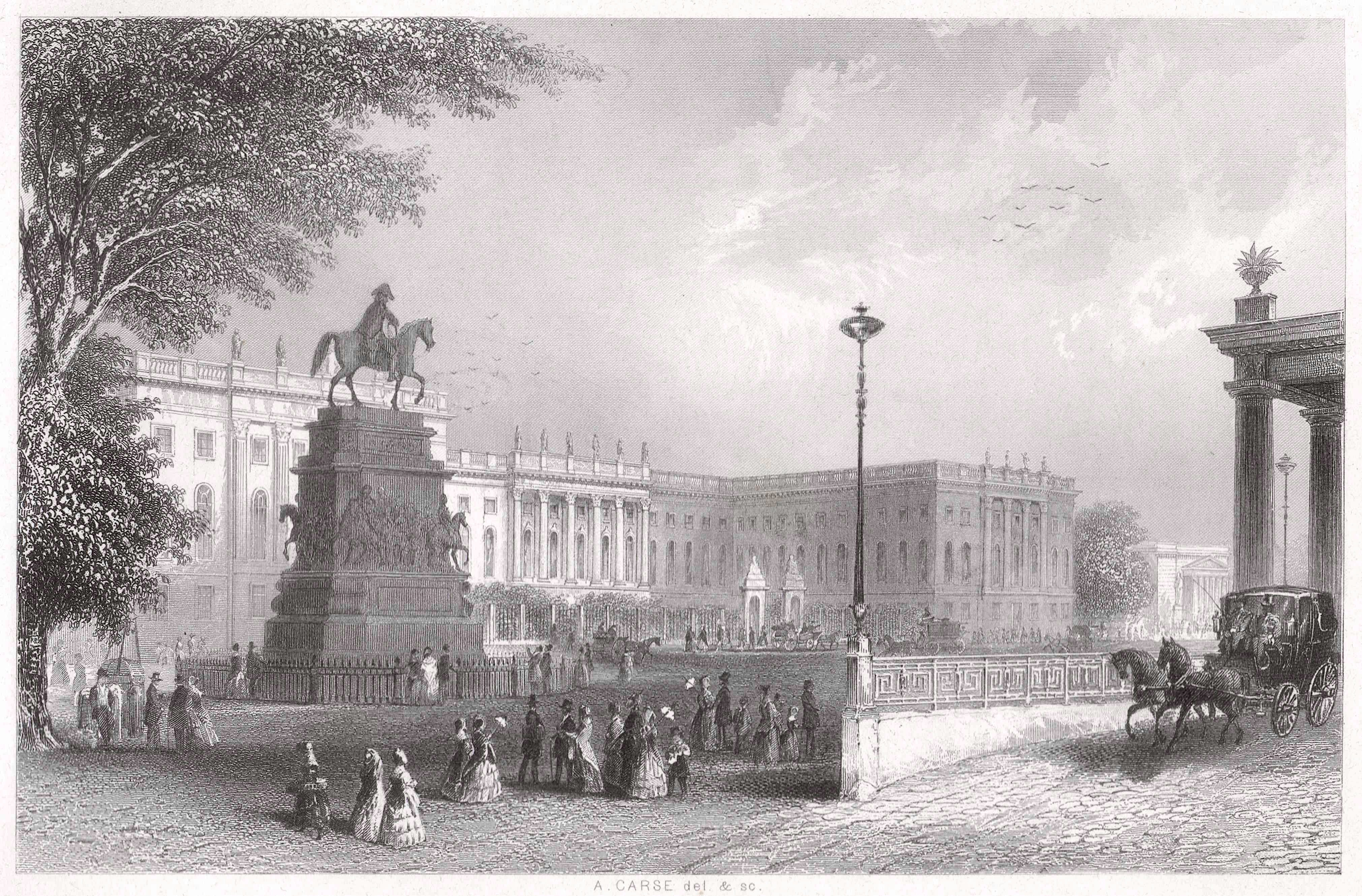
The University of Berlin in 1850

German artists and intellectuals, heavily influenced by the French Revolution, turned to Romanticism. At the universities, high-powered professors developed international reputations, especially in the humanities led by history and philology, which brought new historical perspective to the study of political history, theology, philosophy, language, and literature. With Georg Wilhelm Friedrich Hegel in philosophy, Friedrich Schleiermacher in theology, and Leopold von Ranke in history, the University of Berlin, founded in 1810, became the world's leading university. Von Ranke, for example, professionalized history and set the world standard for historiography. By the 1830s, mathematics, physics, chemistry, and biology had emerged with world-class science, led by Alexander von Humboldt in natural science and Carl Friedrich Gauss in mathematics. Young intellectuals often turned to politics, but their support for the failed Revolution of 1848 forced many into exile.

== Population ==
=== Demographic transition ===
The population of the German Confederation (excluding Austria) grew 60% from 1815 to 1865, from 21,000,000 to 34,000,000. The era saw the demographic transition in Germany from high birth and death rates to low birth and death rates as the country developed from a pre-industrial to a modernized agriculture and supported a fast-growing industrialized urban economic system. In previous centuries, the shortage of land meant that not everyone could marry, and marriages took place after age 25. The high birthrate was offset by a very high rate of infant mortality, plus periodic epidemics and harvest failures. After 1815, increased agricultural productivity meant a larger food supply and a decline in famines, epidemics, and malnutrition. This allowed couples to marry earlier and have more children. Arranged marriages became uncommon as young people were now allowed to choose their partners, subject to a veto by the parents. The upper and middle classes began to practice birth control, and a little later so did the peasants. The population in 1800 was heavily rural, with only 8% of the people living in communities of 5,000 to 100,000 and another 2% living in cities of more than 100,000.

=== Nobility ===
In a heavily agrarian society, land ownership played a central role. Germany's nobles, especially those in the East called Junkers, dominated not only the localities, but also the Prussian court, and especially the Prussian army. Increasingly after 1815, a centralized Prussian government based in Berlin took over the powers of the nobles, which in terms of control over the peasantry had been almost absolute. They retained control of the judicial system on their estates until 1848, as well as control of hunting and game laws. They paid no land tax until 1861 and kept their police authority until 1872, and controlled church affairs into the early 20th century. To help the nobility avoid indebtedness, Berlin set up a credit institution to provide capital loans in 1809, and extended the loan network to peasants in 1849. When the German Empire was established in 1871, the nobility controlled the army and the Navy, the bureaucracy, and the royal court; they generally set governmental policies.

=== Peasantry ===
Peasants continued to center their lives in the village, where they were members of a corporate body and helped manage community resources and monitor community life. In the East, they were serfs who were bound prominently to parcels of land. In most of Germany, farming was handled by tenant farmers who paid rents and obligatory services to the landlord, who was typically a nobleman. (Note: The monasteries of Bavaria, which controlled 56% of the land, were broken up by the government, and sold off around 1803.) Peasant leaders supervised the fields and ditches and grazing rights, maintained public order and morals, and supported a village court which handled minor offenses. Inside the family, the patriarch made all the decisions and tried to arrange advantageous marriages for his children. Much of the villages' communal life centered around church services and holy days. In Prussia, the peasants drew lots to choose conscripts required by the army. The noblemen handled external relationships and politics for the villages under their control, and were not typically involved in daily activities or decisions. (Note: For details on the life of a representative peasant farmer who migrated in 1710 to Pennsylvania, see Kratz, Bernd (2008). "Hans Stauffer: A Farmer in Germany Before his Emigration to Pennsylvania". Genealogist. 22 (2): 131–169.)

=== Rapidly growing cities ===
After 1815, the urban population grew rapidly, due primarily to the influx of young people from the rural areas. Berlin grew from 172,000 people in 1800 to 826,000 in 1870; Hamburg grew from 130,000 to 290,000; Munich from 40,000 to 269,000; Breslau (now Wrocław) from 60,000 to 208,000; Dresden from 60,000 to 177,000; Königsberg (now Kaliningrad) from 55,000 to 112,000. Offsetting this growth, there was extensive emigration, especially to the United States. Emigration totaled 480,000 in the 1840s, 1,200,000 in the 1850s, and 780,000 in the 1860s.

=== Ethnic minorities ===
Despite its name and intention, the German Confederation was not entirely populated by Germans; many people of other ethnic groups lived within its borders:

- French-speaking Walloons lived in western Luxembourg prior to its division in 1839;
- the Duchy of Limburg (a member between 1839 and 1866) had an entirely Dutch population;
- Italians and Slovenians lived in south and southeast Austria;
- Bohemia and Moravia, of the Lands of the Bohemian Crown, were inhabited by a majority of Czechs;
- Silesia had also a Polish and Czech inhabitants, while Sorbs were present in the parts of Saxony and the Prussian province of Brandenburg known as Lusatia

== Zollverein: economic integration ==
Zollverein and German unification

Further efforts to improve the confederation began in 1834 with the establishment of a customs union, the Zollverein. In 1834, the Prussian regime sought to stimulate wider trade advantages and industrialism by decree—a logical continuation of the program of Stein and Hardenberg less than two decades earlier. Historians have seen three Prussian goals: to eliminate Austrian influence in Germany; to improve the economies; and to strengthen Germany against potential French aggression while reducing smaller states' economic independence.

Inadvertently, these reforms sparked the unification movement and augmented a middle class demanding further political rights, but at the time backwardness and Prussia's fears of its stronger neighbors were greater concerns. The customs union opened a common market, ended tariffs between states, and standardized weights, measures, and currencies within member states (excluding Austria), forming the basis of a proto-national economy.

By 1842 the Zollverein included most German states. Within the next 20 years, German furnaces' output increased fourfold. Coal production also grew rapidly. In turn, German industry (especially the works established by the Krupp family) introduced the steel gun, cast-steel axle, and a breech-loading rifle, exemplifying Germany's successful application of technology to weaponry. Germany's security was greatly enhanced, leaving the Prussian state and the landowning aristocracy secure from outside threat. German manufacturers also produced heavily for the civilian sector. No longer did Britain supply half of Germany's needs for manufactured goods, as it had before. But by developing a strong industrial base, the Prussian state strengthened the middle class and thus the nationalist movement. Economic integration, especially increased national consciousness among the German states, made political unity far likelier. Germany finally began exhibiting the features of a proto-nation.

The crucial factor enabling Prussia's conservative regime to survive the Vormärz era was a rough coalition between leading sectors of the landed upper class and the emerging commercial and manufacturing interests. Even if the commercial and industrial element is weak, it must be strong enough (or soon become strong enough) to become worthy of co-optation, and the French Revolution terrified enough perceptive elements of Prussia's Junkers for the state to be sufficiently accommodating.

While relative stability was maintained until 1848, with enough bourgeois elements content to exchange the "right to rule for the right to make money", the landed upper class found its economic base sinking. The Zollverein brought economic progress and helped keep the bourgeoisie at bay for a while, but it swiftly increased the ranks of the middle class—the social base for the nationalism and liberalism that the Prussian state sought to stem.

The Zollverein was a move toward economic integration, modern industrial capitalism, and the victory of centralism over localism, quickly ending the era of guilds in the small German princely states. This led to the 1844 revolt of the Silesian Weavers, who saw their livelihood destroyed by the flood of new manufactures.

The Zollverein also weakened Austrian domination of the Confederation as economic unity increased the desire for political unity and nationalism.

== Revolutions of 1848 ==
War ensign of the Reichsflotte

Naval jack of the Reichsflotte

News of the 1848 Revolution in Paris quickly reached discontented bourgeois liberals, republicans, and more radical workingmen. The first revolutionary uprisings in Germany began in Baden in March 1848. Within a few days, there were revolutionary uprisings in other states, including Austria and finally Prussia. On 15 March, the subjects of Friedrich Wilhelm IV of Prussia vented their long-repressed political aspirations in violent rioting in Berlin, while barricades were erected in the streets of Paris. King Louis-Philippe of France fled to Great Britain. Friedrich Wilhelm gave in to the popular fury, and promised a constitution, a parliament, and support for German unification, safeguarding his own rule and regime.

On 18 May, the Frankfurt Parliament (Frankfurt Assembly) opened its first session, with delegates from various German states. It was immediately divided between those favoring a kleindeutsche (small German) or grossdeutsche (greater German) solution. The former favored offering the imperial crown to Prussia. The latter favored the Habsburg crown in Vienna, which would integrate Austria proper and Bohemia (but not Hungary) into the new Germany.

In May to August, the Assembly installed a provisional German Central Government, while conservatives swiftly moved against the reformers. As in Austria and Russia, this middle-class assertion increased authoritarian and reactionary sentiments among the landed upper class, whose economic position was declining. It turned to political levers to preserve its rule. As the Prussian army proved loyal and the peasants were uninterested, Friedrich Wilhelm regained his confidence. The Assembly belatedly issued its Declaration of the Rights of the German People; a constitution was drawn up (excluding Austria, which openly rejected the Assembly), and the leadership of the Reich was offered to Friedrich Wilhelm, who refused to "pick up a crown from the gutter". As monarchist forces marched their armies to crush rebellions in cities and towns throughout Austria and Germany the Frankfurt Assembly was forced to flee, first to Stuttgart and then to Württemberg, where, reduced to so few deputies that it could no longer form a quorum, its final meeting was forcibly dispersed on 18 June 1849 by the Württemberg army. With the complete triumph of monarchist reaction rampaging across all of Europe, thousands of German middle-class liberals and "red" Forty-eighters were forced to flee into exile (primarily to the United States, the United Kingdom and Australia).

In 1849, Friedrich Wilhelm proposed his own constitution. His document concentrated real power in the hands of the King and the upper classes and called for a confederation of North German states—the Erfurt Union. Austria and Russia, fearing a strong, Prussian-dominated Germany, responded by pressuring Saxony and Hanover to withdraw, and forced Prussia to abandon the scheme in a treaty dubbed the "humiliation of Olmütz".

== Dissolution of the Confederation ==
=== Rise of Bismarck ===
A new generation of statesmen responded to popular demands for national unity for their own ends, continuing Prussia's tradition of autocracy and reform from above. Germany found an able leader to accomplish the seemingly paradoxical task of conservative modernization. In 1851, Bismarck was appointed by King Wilhelm I of Prussia (the future Kaiser Wilhelm I) to circumvent the liberals in the Landtag of Prussia, who resisted Wilhelm's autocratic militarism. Bismarck told the Diet, "The great questions of the day are not decided by speeches and majority votes ... but by blood and iron"—that is, by warfare and industrial might. Prussia already had a great army; it was now augmented by rapid growth of economic power.

Gradually, Bismarck subdued the more restive elements of the middle class with a combination of threats and reforms, reacting to the revolutionary sentiments expressed in 1848 by giving them the economic opportunities for which the urban middle sectors had been fighting.

=== Austro-Prussian War ===
The German Confederation ended as a result of the Austro-Prussian War of 1866 between Austria and its allies on one side and Prussia and its allies on the other. The Confederation had 34 members immediately before its dissolution. In July, the Confederation diet removed itself to Augsburg. In the Prague peace treaty, on 23 August 1866, Austria accepted that the Confederation was dissolved. The next day, the remaining member states met in Augsburg and confirmed the dissolution. Eight states dissolved without complaint, while Hanover reserved the right to press charges against the other states for demanding loyalty during the war. The treaty allowed Prussia to create a new Bundesverhältnis (a new kind of federation) in northern Germany. The four southern German states of Baden, Bavaria, Hesse-Darmstadt and Württemberg would be permitted to create a South German Confederation, but it never came into existence. In the following months, Prussia annexed the former Confederation states of Electoral Hesse, Frankfurt, Hanover, Holstein and Nassau in their entirety. It also annexed Hesse-Homberg from the Grand Duchy of Hesse. All had been allied with Austria in the recent war.

=== North German Confederation ===
Prussia created the North German Confederation in 1867, a federal state combining all German states north of the river Main and also the Hohenzollern territories in Swabia, twenty-two in all. The former Confederation states of Limberg, Liechtenstein and Luxembourg were not included. Austria and the four southern German states also remained separate from the rest of Germany. However, with the successful prosecution of the Franco-Prussian War, the four southern states joined the North German Confederation by treaties in November 1870.

=== German Empire ===
As the Franco-Prussian War drew to a close, King Ludwig II of Bavaria was persuaded to ask King Wilhelm to assume the crown of the new German Empire. On 1 January 1871, the Empire was declared by the presiding princes and generals in the Hall of Mirrors in the Palace of Versailles, near Paris. The Diet of the North German Confederation moved to rename the North German Confederation the German Empire and gave the title German Emperor to the King of Prussia. The new constitution of the state, the Constitution of the German Confederation, effectively transformed the Diet of the Confederation into the German Parliament (Reichstag).

== Legacy ==
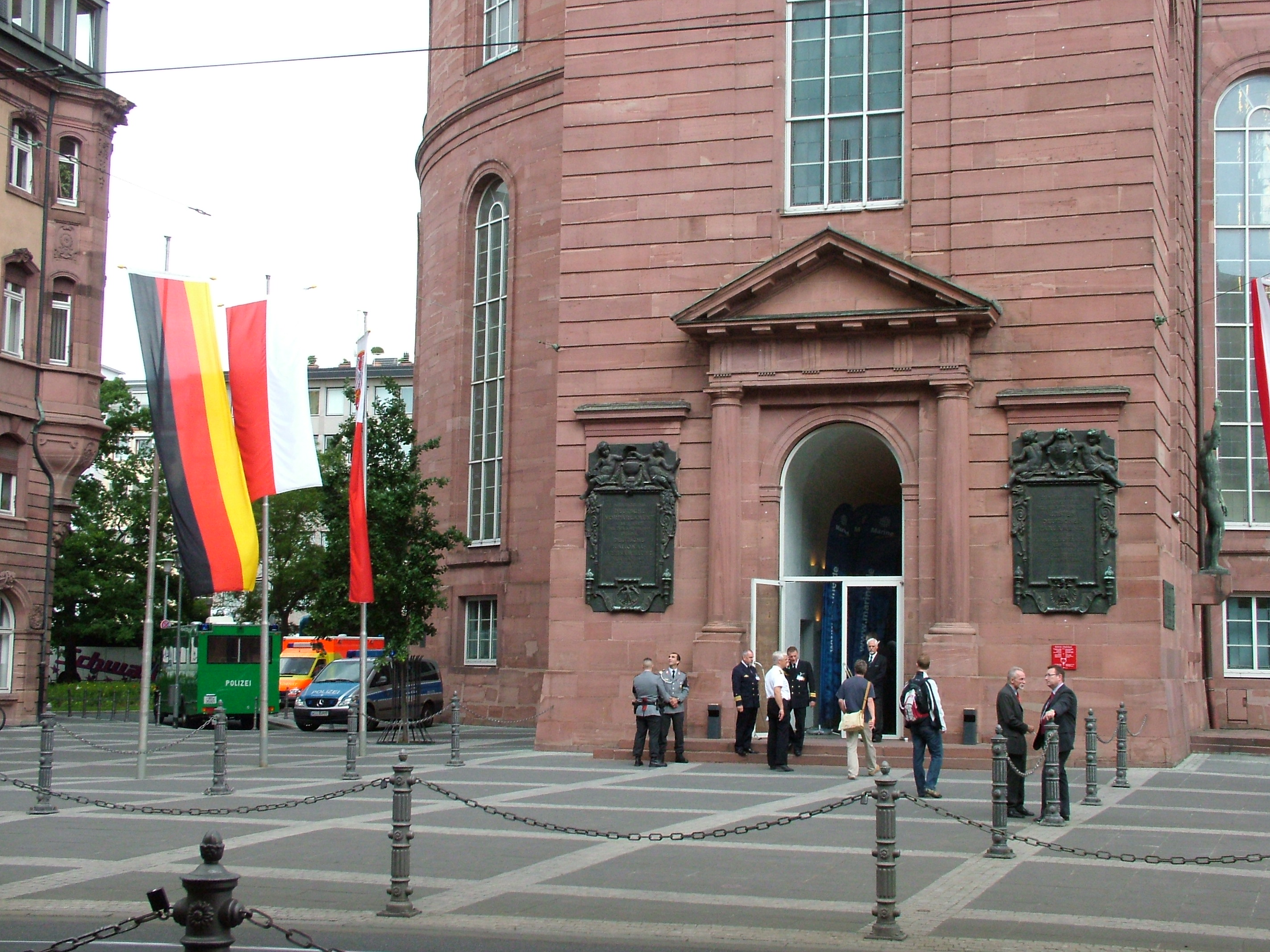
In Frankfurt at the Paulskirche, 14 June 2008: The German navy commemorates the 160th anniversary of the decision of the Frankfurt Parliament to create the Reichsflotte.

The modern German nation state known as the Federal Republic is the continuation of the North German Confederation of 1867. This North German Confederation, a federal state, was a totally new creation: the law of the German Confederation ended, and new law came into existence. The German Confederation was, according to historian Michael Kotulla, an association of states (Staatenbund) with some elements of a federal state (Bundesstaat), and the North German Confederation was a federal state with some elements of an association of states.

Still, the discussions and ideas of the period 1815–66 had a huge influence on the constitution of the North German Confederation. Most notably may be the Federal Council, the organ representing the member states. It is a copy of the 1815 Federal Convention of the German Confederation. The successor of that Federal Council of 1867 is the modern Bundesrat of the Federal Republic.

The German Confederation does not play a very prominent role in German historiography and national culture. It is mainly seen as an instrument to oppress the liberal, democratic, and national movements of the period. The March revolution (1848–49), with its events and institutions, attracts much more attention and devotion. The most important memorial sites are the Paulskirche in Frankfurt, a cultural hall of national importance, and the Rastatt castle with the Erinnerungsstätte für die Freiheitsbewegungen in der deutschen Geschichte (a museum and memorial site for the freedom movements in the German history, not only the March revolution).

The remnants of the federal fortifications are tourist attractions at least regionally or for people interested in military history.

== Territorial legacy ==
The current countries whose territory was partly or entirely inside the boundaries of the German Confederation 1815–1866 are:

- Germany (all states except Southern Schleswig in the north of Schleswig-Holstein)
- Austria (all states except Burgenland)
- Luxembourg (entire territory)
- Liechtenstein (entire territory)
- Netherlands (Duchy of Limburg, was a member of the Confederation from 1839 until 1866)
- Czech Republic (entire territory)
- Slovenia (except for Prekmurje and the municipalities of Koper, Izola and Piran)
- Poland (West Pomeranian Voivodship, Lubusz Voivodship, Lower Silesian Voivodship, Opole Voivodship, part of Silesia – overwhelmingly German-speaking at the time; East Prussia, West Prussia, and much of the Grand Duchy of Posen were admitted into the Confederation on 11 April 1848, but the terms of the restored Confederate Diet removed these territories on 30 May 1851)
- Belgium (nine of the eleven cantons of Eupen-Malmedy, Liège Province); the larger province of Luxembourg had left the Confederation at its accession to Belgium in 1839
- Italy (autonomous region of Trentino-Alto Adige/Südtirol, the Province of Trieste, most of the Province of Gorizia except the Monfalcone enclave, and the municipalities of Tarvisio, Malborghetto Valbruna, Pontebba, Aquileia, Fiumicello, and Cervignano in the Province of Udine)
- Croatia (the Pazin territory in Istria county and the coastal strip between Opatija and Plomin in the Liburnia region)

Denmark proper was never a member state, but its king was at the same time the duke of the member states Holstein and Lauenburg. The Duchy of Schleswig (which now partly belongs to Denmark) was never a part of the Confederation, though it was mentioned in the 1849 Frankfurt Constitution and governed briefly by a government installed by the German Central Government. Holstein, Lauenburg, and Schleswig were combined under an Austrian-Prussian condominium in 1864–1866.

== See also ==
- States of the German Confederation
- History of Germany
- Former countries in Europe after 1815

== Sources ==
- Case, Nelson (1902). European Constitutional History. Cincinnati: Jennings & Pye. OCLC 608806061. OL 6918961M.
- Hertslet, Edward (1875). The Map of Europe by Treaty: Showing the Various Political and Territorial Changes Which Have Taken Place Since the General Peace of 1814. Vol. I–III. London: Butterworths.
- Kotulla, Michael (2006). Deutsches Verfassungsrecht 1806–1918: Eine Dokumentensammlung nebst Einführungen [German Constitutional Law 1806–1918: A Collection of Documents with Introductions]. Berlin, Heidelberg: Springer Verlag. ISBN 978-3-540-29289-0.
- Malet, Sir Alexander (1870). The Overthrow of the Germanic Confederation by Prussia in 1866. London: Longmans, Green and Co.
- Nipperdey, Thomas (1996). Germany from Napoleon to Bismarck. Princeton: Princeton University Press. ISBN 0-6910-2636-X.
- Sagarra, Eda (1977). A Social History of Germany: 1648–1914. Holmes & Meier. pp. 37–55, 183–202. ISBN 0-8419-0332-8. OL 21299230M.
- Sagarra, Eda (1980). An Introduction to Nineteenth Century Germany. Harlow, Essex: Longman Group Limited. ISBN 978-0-582-35137-0.
- Williamson, David G. (2005). Germany Since 1815: A Nation Forged and Renewed. New York: Palgrave Macmillan. ISBN 978-0-333-92095-4.
