= South German Confederation =

Proposed European polity (1866–1869)

Germany between the War of 1866 and the Franco-Prussian War of 1870/71

From 1866 to 1869, the South German Confederation or Südbund, was the idea that the southern German states of Bavaria, Württemberg, Baden and Hesse-Darmstadt would form a confederation of states. Article 4 of the Peace of Prague after the Austro-Prussian War spoke of this possibility (literally: “meet into an association”). However, due to disagreement among themselves, the southern German states concerned did not make use of this.

In the north, the Kingdom of Prussia formed the North German Confederation as a new German federal state. The North German Confederation and Prussia individually concluded defense treaties with the southern states, the protection and defensive alliances. In 1870/1871, after France's defeat in the Franco-Prussian War, the North German Confederation absorbed the southern states and transformed itself into the German Empire.

== Background ==
During the Erfurt Union of 1849–1850, it was evident that the Kingdom of Prussia's influence was largely confined to northern Germany. The large southern kingdoms of Bavaria and Württemberg, along with Saxony, vehemently rejected any unification under Prussian leadership. (Saxony would later be compelled to join the North German Confederation in 1866 after its defeat alongside Austria). However, this coalition of states, often termed "Third Germany," failed to maintain an independent policy between the rival powers of Austria and Prussia over the next two decades. Bavaria aspired to a leadership role within this group, but its ambitions were not recognized by the other medium and small states.

France opposed Prussian expansion south of the Main River. French Emperor Napoleon III actively sought to counter Prussian influence and pursued ambitions to annex German territories on the left bank of the Rhine. To this end, he negotiated a secret treaty with Austria in June 1866. Bismarck's subsequent decision to form a new federal state comprising only the northern German states was therefore seen as a concession that temporarily reassured both Austria and France.

These tensions culminated in an agreement between Prussia and France on July 14, 1866. Prussia was permitted to establish a federal state in the north, while the southern German states were to be allowed to form their own alliance, which would be internationally independent. The northern state and this southern alliance were free to determine their own mutual relationship. From the French perspective, this division of Germany into a northern state, a southern alliance, and Austria would not upset the European balance of power.

Despite the otherwise similar content of the two peace treaties that ended the Austro-Prussian War, the concept of a Southern Confederation was not mentioned in the preliminary Peace of Nikolsburg (July 26, 1866) but was first formally addressed in the final Peace of Prague (August 23, 1866).

== Location in Southern Germany ==
In the largest of the four states, Bavaria, Prime Minister Chlodwig zu Hohenlohe-Schillingsfürst was in favor of joining Prussia, while the king was against it. Baden also sought to join the new (North German) Confederation. However, the Peace of Prague prohibited Prussia from incorporating southern German states into its new alliance. The situation of Hesse-Darmstadt was special, as only one of its three provinces (Upper Hesse) became a member of the North German Confederation.

In a ministerial declaration of May 6, 1867, Bavaria and Württemberg advocated that the southern German states should be associated with the North German Confederation through a confederation of states. This confederation of states was intended as a copy of the German Confederation. Prussia rejected such a construction. Chlodwig, in turn, rejected Bavaria's accession to the North German Confederation in parliament on October 8, 1867, as well as a final southern German federal state or a "constitutional alliance of the southern German states under the leadership of Austria". Rather, the southern German states should individually “establish closer contact” with northern Germany.

Although Prussia wanted German unification, it did not dare to openly violate the Peace of Prague. Baden, Württemberg and Hesse-Darmstadt preferred to communicate directly with Prussia and not become dependent on Bavaria. On November 23, 1867, Chlodwig proposed a confederation of states, the United South German States, including a draft constitution. On Prussia's advice, Baden treated the Bavarian proposals with delay, thereby bringing them to a standstill in 1868.

On the occasion of the peace treaty with Prussia in 1866, the southern German states had already signed (initially) secret military alliances with Prussia, as the dissolution of the German Confederation meant that there was no longer any military guarantee and they would therefore have been left defenseless against an attack by France. They also partially standardized their military constitutions among themselves.

== See also ==
- Southern Germany
- November Treaties
