= North German Constitution =

1867–1871 federal constitution

Constitution of the North German Confederation
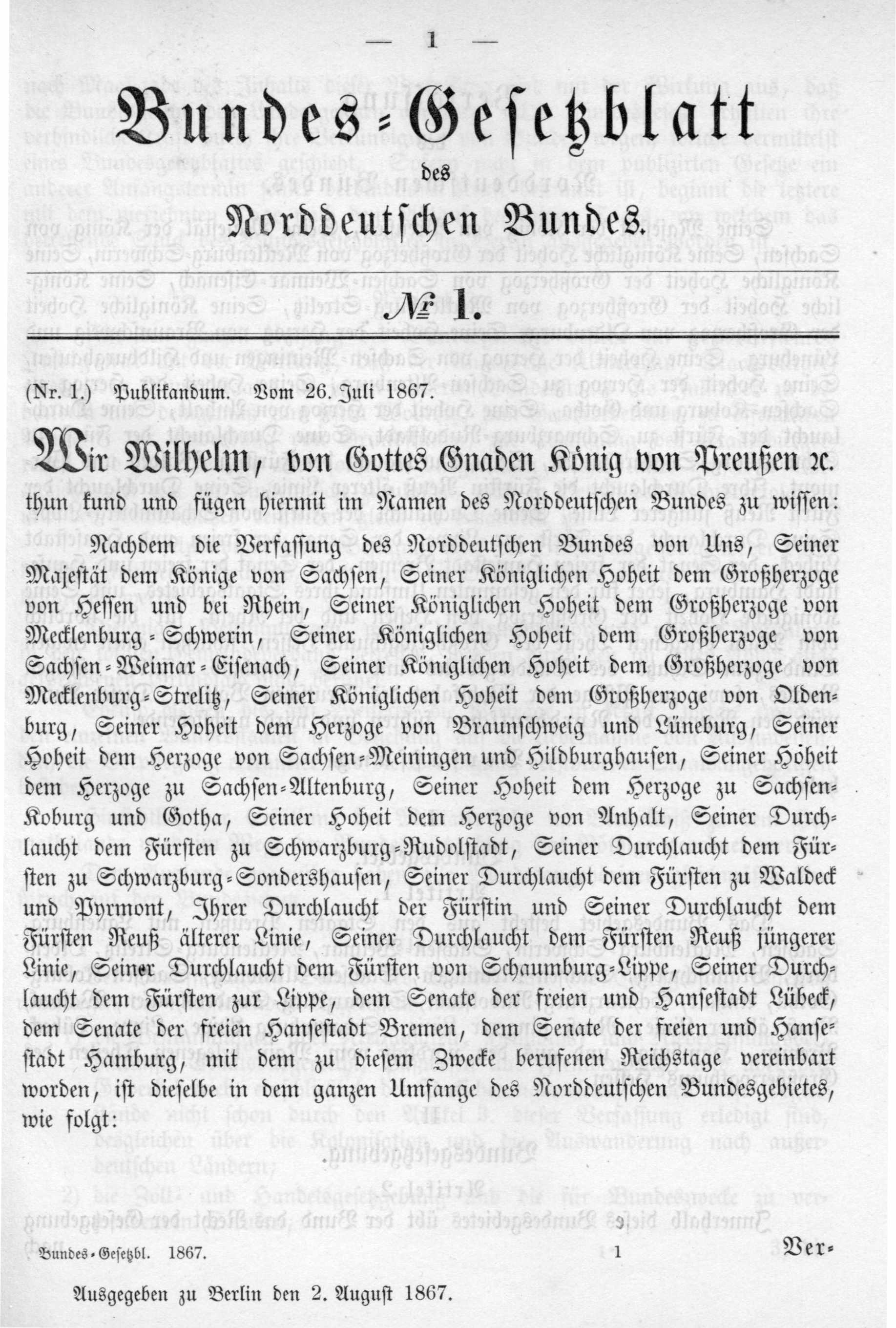
- Preamble of the Constitution as published in the Bundes-Gesetzblatt (Federal Law Gazette) of 2 August 1867

Overview
- Original title: Verfassung des Norddeutschen Bundes
- Jurisdiction: North German Confederation
- Ratified: 16 April 1867
- System: Confederal parliamentary semi-constitutional monarchy

Government structure
- Branches: 2
- Head of state: King of Prussia
- Chambers: Upper House: Bundesrat; Lower House: Reichstag
- Executive: King of Prussia; Chancellor
- Federalism: Yes
- Repealed: 1 January 1871

The North German Constitution, officially the Constitution of the North German Confederation (German: Verfassung des Norddeutschen Bundes) was the constitution of the North German Confederation, which existed as a state from 1 July 1867 to 31 December 1870. The Constitution of the German Empire of 1871 was closely based on it.

The Constitution bore a strong imprint of the German chancellor, Otto von Bismarck, who wanted a loosely organized confederation in which sovereignty rested with the individual states as a whole. The upper house of parliament, the Bundesrat, as the body representing the states, was thus the Confederation's sovereign. Its members were chosen by the states' governments. The members of the lower house of parliament, the Reichstag, were elected by universal manhood suffrage. The Reichstag participated on an equal footing with the Bundesrat in legislation for the Confederation.

The chancellor, who presided over the Bundesrat, was appointed by the king of Prussia and was responsible only to him. The king was head of state and was responsible for executing federal laws passed by the parliament but had no veto right. He was commander-in-chief of the federal army and navy and could declare war and make peace.

The Constitution did not provide for federal courts. Disputes between states were to be resolved by the Bundesrat. The individual states retained their statehood, constitutions, successions to the throne and electoral rights, although they lost their sovereignty to the Confederation.

The North German Constitution remained in force until the short-lived Constitution of the German Confederation, which was based largely on its predecessor, went into effect on 1 January 1871.

== Historical background ==
After the failure of the German revolutions of 1848–49, the government of Prussia was convinced that the German people would continue to pursue their "redemption from fragmentation and powerlessness" regardless of the continued existence of the individual states and the aristocracies that still ruled in them. The Prussian government made itself an advocate of the unification movement in order to preserve the Prussian, anti-democratic state and social order.

Prussia's victory over Austria in the Austro-Prussian War, which ended on 22 July 1866 with the Treaty of Prague, dissolved the German Confederation and allowed Prussia to annex many of the smaller German states to form the North German Confederation through the Treaty of 18 August 1866. On 10 June 1866, four days before the start of the war, the Prussian government had presented the other German states with the outlines of a new federal constitution containing ten articles that formulated its key principles. An assembly of the representatives of the individual states, the Federal Council (Bundesrat), was to be responsible for legislation along with a national assembly (Reichstag) elected according to equal, secret and universal manhood suffrage. The national assembly was initially to act as a constituent assembly to which the governments of the North German states were to submit a draft constitution for final approval.

=== Preliminary drafts ===
Maximilian Duncker, a liberal member of the Prussian House of Representatives, produced a draft constitution at the request of Prussian minister president Otto von Bismarck in September 1866. He considered the proposal too cumbersome and centralistic, and as a result it was used as a counter-model and not as the prototype for the Constitution as it developed.

After Bismarck made several revisions and corrections, Lothar Bucher, an aide to Bismarck, produced a draft with 65 articles on 8 December 1866, which he revised again on 9 December. The draft went to the Prussian cabinet for approval. For the meeting of the Council of Ministers on 13 December, a newly edited draft with 69 articles was prepared with many of Bismarck's amendments, which were removed during the course of the meeting. On 15 December 1866, the cabinet's draft was forwarded to the governments of the North German states. On 12 February 1867, the constituent Reichstag was elected; it convened for its first session on 24 February 1867. The state governments adopted Bismarck's final amendments and submitted them to the constituent Reichstag on 4 March 1867. The Reichstag then made significant changes to the founding governments' draft.

== Content ==
=== Bundesrat and chancellor ===
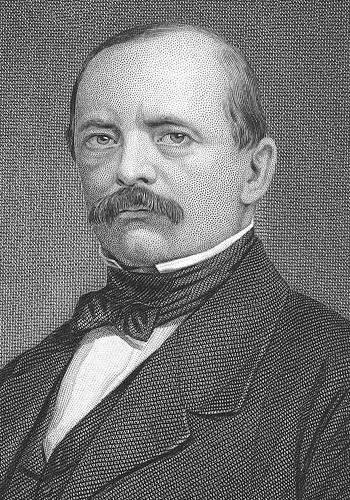
Otto von Bismarck, Chancellor of the North German Confederation throughout its life, in 1873

Under the final form of the Constitution, the constituent states sent representatives to a Bundesrat (Federal Council), which participated in legislation on an equal footing with the Reichstag. Prussia was entitled to 17 out of 43 votes, which secured it a hegemonic position. No constitutional amendment could be passed against Prussia's will, since it required a two-thirds majority to change the Constitution (Article 78). The allocation of votes by state was laid out in Article 6.

The individual states were required to vote collectively (Prussia, for example, had to cast all 17 of its votes either yea or nay), and the vote could be cast only as decided by the government of the state (Article 7). The Bundesrat participated in legislation on an equal footing with the Reichstag. No law could enter into force without the consent of the Bundesrat (Article 5). Both the Bundesrat and the Reichstag thus had the implicit right of veto by voting against a proposal.

The Bundesrat did not have the right to issue general administrative regulations on federal laws or to determine the organisation of the administrative authorities. It was nevertheless able to exercise general control over the federal administration. Each individual state was authorised to make proposals for the exercise of federal supervision, to represent them and to have them discussed in plenary session (Article 7). The orders and decrees concerning the federal administration were not issued by the Bundesrat but by the king of Prussia (Article 17).

The Constitution did not explicitly say who was the holder of overall state power (the sovereign). Bismarck wanted to create a federal state that resembled a confederation of states. The state sovereign was to be the individual states united in the Bundesrat as a whole, not a personal sovereign (i.e. an emperor).

The federal chancellor, who was appointed by the king of Prussia, presided over the Bundesrat and directed its business. All of the king's orders and decrees had to be countersigned by the chancellor so that he assumed responsibility for them (Articles 15 and 17).

=== Reichstag ===
North German Confederation. Prussia is shown in blue.

The Reichstag was the democratic body of the North German Confederation, and it participated on an equal footing with the Bundesrat in the Confederation's legislation (Articles 4 and 5). It was not a full parliament, since it was dependent on other state bodies and had no comprehensive rights of control over the government. The Reichstag also did not have the right of self-assembly. Only the king of Prussia was authorised to convene, open, adjourn and close the Reichstag (Article 12). The Bundesrat could dissolve the Reichstag by mutual agreement with the king (Article 24).

The Reichstag had no general authority to approve international treaties, a limitation that was imposed to allow secret diplomacy (per Article 22, Reichstag meetings were open to the public). The king alone was responsible for concluding all international treaties, but they required the approval of both the Bundesrat and the Reichstag if their content was subject to federal legislation (Article 11).

The Reichstag could neither elect nor remove the government (i.e. ministers). Bismarck wanted to avoid a government because he feared that it would become accountable to the Reichstag. He also disliked the model of the collegial Prussian Council of Ministers because it did not give the leading minister clear political responsibility.

Election to the Reichstag was by universal, equal, direct and secret manhood suffrage (Article 20). The North German Constitution was indirectly based on the Frankfurt Imperial Election Act of 12 April 1849 in which the principles were implemented. Bismarck considered it simple and useful to dispense with the interposition of electors and the three-tier electoral system he was familiar with. For foreign policy reasons, Bismarck adopted the universal manhood suffrage of the Frankfurt Constitution in his outlines for the new federal constitution. He hoped that Austria and Russia would not draw the attention of their populations to the suffrage withheld from them and would therefore pass over the emergence of a new power in Europe in silence.

The prosecution of members of parliament required the prior consent of the Reichstag (Article 31). Members of the Reichstag could not be appointed as heads of the highest federal authorities (Article 21). Per diems were banned (Article 32) with the intention of keeping members of the propertyless classes out of the Reichstag. Except when the subject was either foreign or military policy, the debates of the Reichstag were open to the public.(Article 22). Members of the Reichstag could not be prosecuted under civil or criminal law for their statements in the Reichstag (Article 30), nor could journalists who reported on them (Article 22).

For a federal bill to be passed, there had to be concurring resolutions from both the Reichstag and the Bundesrat (Article 5), either of which could block the other. In order to end impasses, it was permissible for the Bundesrat, in agreement with the king of Prussia and the countersigning federal chancellor, to dissolve the Reichstag (Article 24).

== King of Prussia ==
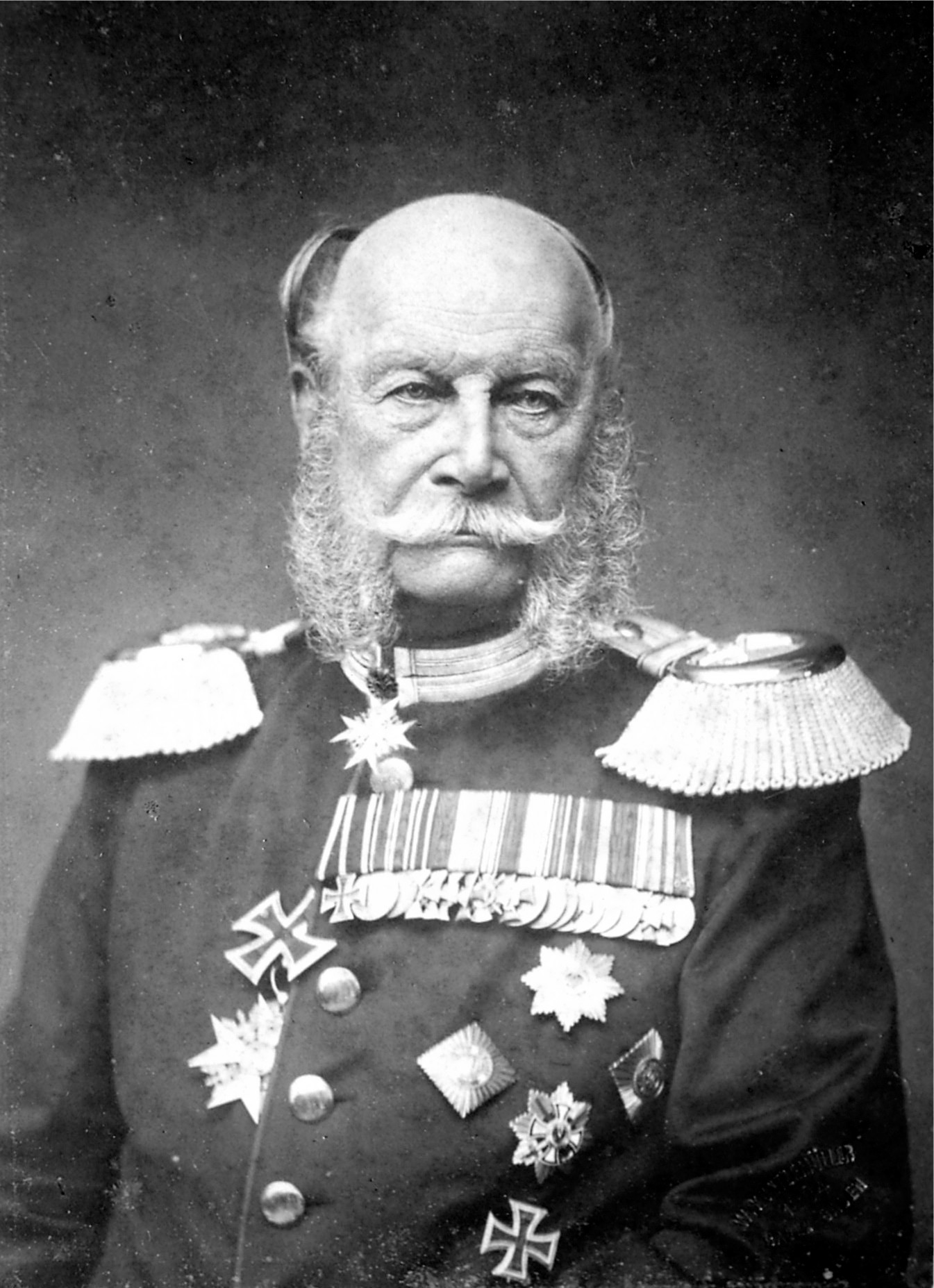
King Wilhelm I, who was King of Prussia during the life of the North German Confederation

The king of Prussia was the head of state (referred to in the Constitution as the "presidium") of the North German Confederation (Article 11). As holder of the federal presidency, he had the governmental powers of submitting proposals to the Reichstag and of enacting and executing federal laws (Articles 16 and 17). He was commander-in-chief of the federal army (Article 63) and navy (Article 53) and was responsible for declaring war and concluding peace in the name of the Confederation (Article 11). Because of royal rights and the restrictions on the rights of the Reichstag, the North German Confederation was established a semi-constitutional monarchy.

As head of state, the king was able to conclude alliances and other foreign policy treaties (Article 11). Foreign policy power was also concentrated in the hands of the king because neither the approval of the Reichstag nor the countersignature of the chancellor was required for acts of command and military organisation (Article 63). The most important governmental power of the king was to appoint the federal chancellor (Article 15). He also had the right to supervise the execution of federal laws by the administration of the individual states and the federal administration. He did not issue orders and individual regulations in the name of Prussia but for the North German Confederation.

The king of Prussia had no veto right in the legislature, but he could assert his hegemonic claim in the Bundesrat through the seventeen votes Prussia had there. The Prussian votes were instructed by the minister president of Prussia, who was also chancellor and chairman of the Bundesrat (Article 15). Prussia had a blocking minority for constitutional amendments (Article 78), in military and naval affairs (Article 5) and in customs and excise duties and the associated administrative regulations and administrative authorities (Articles 35 and 37).

== Military ==
In the alliance treaty of 18 August 1866, Prussia and the other North German states had agreed that all troops would be under the supreme command of the king of Prussia as Federal Field Commander (Bundesfeldherr). As "chiefs of the troops in their territory", the federal princes were military rulers only at need and without command authority (Article 66). The soldiers still had to take an oath of allegiance to the princes, but it had to include obedience to the king of Prussia as well (Article 64). The peacetime strength was one per cent of the population (Article 60), and the individual states had to pay an annual contribution of 225 Thaler for each soldier to the Confederation (Article 62). The army was a federal army (Article 63) and therefore uniform in terms of administration, rations, armaments and equipment (Article 63). The king of Prussia appointed the highest commander of a contingent (Article 64). Prussian military legislation was introduced in all individual states (Article 61), as were Prussian administrative regulations (Article 63). The navy was under Prussian supreme command and was financed exclusively by the federal government (Article 63).

== Finances ==
Direct taxes, such as income tax, remained with the individual states. The revenue from customs and excise duties went to the federal treasury. If customs and excise duties were not sufficient, the individual states were obliged to make additional levy contributions (Article 70). In cases of "extraordinary need", the federal government was authorized to borrow (Article 73). Until 31 December 1871 (which turned out to be beyond the life of the North German Confederation), the budget for the army was submitted to the Reichsrat for information only (Article 71). The federal government bore the costs of the navy alone (Article 53). The budget period was normally for one year (Article 71), and the king was required to render an annual account of expenditures to the Reichsrat and Reichstag (Article 72).

== Judicial powers ==
The North German Constitution did not provide for federal courts. Disputes between individual states were to be settled by the Bundesrat. For internal state constitutional disputes, the federal constitution provided for expert recommendations or settlements by the Bundesrat, or, if necessary, federal laws, unless the state constitutions had their own regulations (Article 76). Since the Constitution also did not provide for fundamental rights, it left jurisdiction with the individual states, initially to an even greater extent than administrative jurisdiction.

In 1869, the Federal Supreme Commercial Court (Bundesoberhandelsgericht) was established with its seat in Leipzig. In commercial matters, it replaced the highest court with jurisdiction under the laws of the individual state. The introduction of a federal court jurisdiction was the most important constitutional amendment during the time of the North German Confederation, although the constitutional text did not provide for federal jurisdiction over the constitution of the courts (Article 4, section 13).

== Federal states ==
There was no general clause stating that the constituent states retained their independence except where Constitution provided for restrictions. The clause in Article 2 stating that "within the federal territory, the Confederation shall exercise the right of legislation in accordance with the content of this Constitution" suggested the inverse conclusion that the constituent states retained the right to legislate insofar as the right was not assigned to the Confederation.

The individual states retained their statehood, constitutions, succession to the throne and their electoral rights, which were restricted to certain groups of people. The Constitution also left untouched the previous responsibilities of the individual states such as policing, budgetary law, religion, schools and universities. The Constitution did not prohibit the individual states from changing the monarchical form of government to a republican one or vice versa. The Confederation was not prevented from taking on further powers by amending the Constitution and thus developing further into a unitary state.

As members of a federal state, the individual states lost their sovereignty. They could, for example, no longer represent themselves in their dealings with other states; the responsibility was transferred to the king of Prussia (Article 11).

== Replacement ==
In September 1870, during the Franco-Prussian War (19 July 1870 – 10 May 1871), the North German Confederation under Prussian leadership began unification talks with the south German states. The result was the Constitution of the German Confederation, which was based largely on the 1867 North German Constitution and went into effect on 1 January 1871. That constitution was replaced in May 1871 by the Constitution of the German Empire. It, too, was an only slightly modified version of the North German Constitution. It renamed the Confederation to the German Empire, made the head of state the German emperor and added special clauses for Bavaria and Württemberg. It remained in effect until the end of World War I in November 1918.

== Assessment ==
Weaknesses in the Constitution, such as the unspecified and therefore unstable balance between the king of Prussia and the chancellor and between the chancellor and the Reichstag, remained hidden in the early years because Bismarck was able to exercise the office at his own political discretion. The Reichstag majority was of the opinion that the Constitution had worked brilliantly. The North German Confederation was successful because the Reichstag with its liberal majority, the Bundesrat, the chancellor and the president of the federal chancellery, Rudolf von Delbrück, were able to create the long-sought unified economic area in just four years. The unresolved opposition between the chancellor, Bundesrat and Reichstag did not come to the fore because of the liberal majority and its successes. It was only later, under the German Empire and its constitution that the limited influence of the chancellor and Reichstag on foreign policy became noticeable, and it was not until the 20th century that an incorrectly composed Reich leadership and an uncontrolled Supreme Army Command caused the monarchical federal state to fall into a deep decline.
