= Constitution of the German Empire =

German constitution from 1871 to 1918

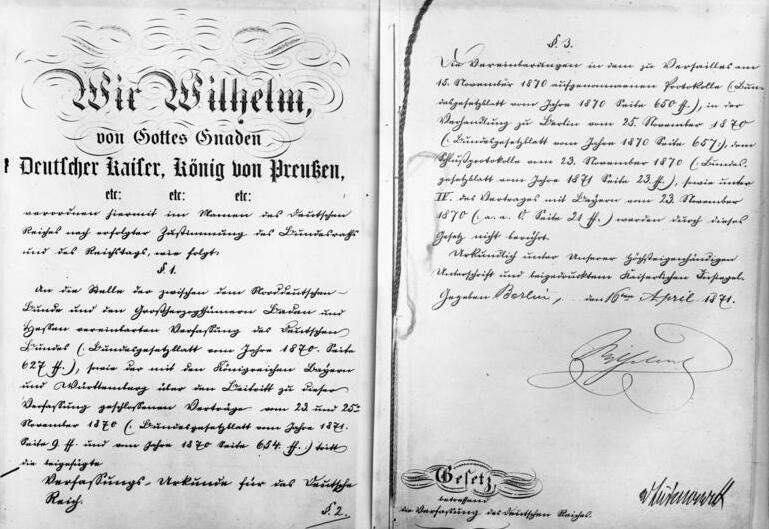
- First and last page of the constitution of 1871, with the signature of Wilhelm, German Emperor and King of Prussia

Overview
- Original title: Verfassung des Deutschen Reiches
- Jurisdiction: German Empire
- Ratified: 16 April 1871
- Date effective: 4 May 1871
- System: Federal parliamentary semi-constitutional monarchy

Government structure
- Branches: 3
- Head of state: German Emperor
- Chambers: Upper House: Bundesrat; Lower House: Reichstag
- Executive: Chancellor
- Judiciary: Reichsgericht
- Federalism: Yes
- Repealed: 14 August 1919

Full text
- Constitution of the German Empire at Wikisource

German constitution of 1871, chart

The Constitution of the German Empire (German: Verfassung des Deutschen Reiches) was the basic law of the German Empire. It came into effect on 4 May 1871 and lasted formally until 14 August 1919. Some German historians refer to it as Bismarck's imperial constitution (German: Bismarcksche Reichsverfassung, BRV).

The Constitution created a federation (federally organised national state) of 25 German states under the permanent presidency of Prussia, the largest and most powerful of the states. The presidency (Bundespräsidium) was a hereditary office of the King of Prussia, who had the title of German Emperor. The emperor appointed the chancellor, who was the head of government and chairman of the Bundesrat, the council of representatives of the German states. Laws were enacted by the Bundesrat and the Reichstag, the parliament elected by male Germans above the age of 25 years.

The imperial constitution followed an earlier constitution of 1 January 1871, the Constitution of the German Confederation. That constitution incorporated some of the agreements between the North German Confederation and the four German states south of the River Main which were joining the new empire. It renamed the country to Deutsches Reich (conventionally translated to 'German Empire') and gave the Prussian king the title of German Emperor.

The constitutions of 1 January and 4 May 1871 are both essentially an amended version of the North German Constitution, which had been drafted to reflect the ideas of Otto von Bismarck. The political system remained the same. The constitution went out of effect in the November Revolution of 1918 when the legislative and executive powers were taken over by a new revolutionary body. In 1919 a popularly elected national assembly created a republican constitution known as the Weimar Constitution, which has the same title in German as its predecessor (Verfassung des Deutschen Reiches, or 'Constitution of the German Reich').

== Historical background ==
Following the victory of the Kingdom of Prussia over the Austrian Empire in the Austro-Prussian War of 1866, Prussia annexed many of the smaller German states to form the North German Confederation. On 10 June 1866, four days before the start of the war, the Prussian government of Otto von Bismarck had presented the affected states with the outline of a new federal constitution containing ten articles that formulated its key principles. An assembly of the representatives of the individual states, the Federal Council (Bundesrat), was to be responsible for legislation along with a national assembly (Reichstag) elected according to equal, secret and universal manhood suffrage. Bismarck's draft became the Constitution of the North German Confederation and was adopted on 17 April 1867.

In September 1870, during the Franco-Prussian War (19 July 1870 – 10 May 1871), the North German Confederation under Prussian leadership began unification talks with the south German states. The results were formalized in the three November Treaties, the first between the North German Confederation and the Grand Duchies of Baden and Hesse, and the other two between the Confederation and the Kingdoms of Bavaria and Württemberg individually; all were effective as of 1 January 1871. The first treaty made slight modifications to the North German Constitution to create the Constitution of the German Confederation (1 January 1871 – 16 April 1871).

Based on the provisions of the Confederation's constitution, a new Reichstag was elected on 3 March 1871. It approved a revised constitutional text on 14 April that included the agreements with Bavaria and Württemberg. The Act Concerning the Constitution of the German Empire of 16 April 1871 combined the accession treaties and replaced the term “Confederation” with “Empire”. The revised constitutional text, the Constitution of the German Empire, remained in its fundaments the same as the North German Constitution. It became effective on 4 May 1871.

== Signatories and members ==
The constitution was signed by William I, the king of Prussia, acting in his capacity as Bundespräsidium (president) of the North German Confederation, along with the kings of Bavaria and Württemberg and the grand dukes of Baden and Hesse. Hesse north of the River Main was already a member of the North German Confederation; its territory south of the river became part of the Empire with the new constitution.

The 22 member states of the North German Confederation that became constituents of the Empire were Prussia, Saxony, Mecklenburg-Schwerin, Saxe-Weimar-Eisenach, Mecklenburg-Strelitz, Oldenburg, Brunswick, Saxe-Meiningen, Saxe-Altenburg, Saxe-Coburg-Gotha, Anhalt, Schwarzburg-Rudolstadt, Schwarzburg-Sondershausen, Waldeck, Reuss (older line), Reuss (younger line), Schaumburg-Lippe, Lippe, Lübeck, Bremen, and Hamburg.

== Emperor ==
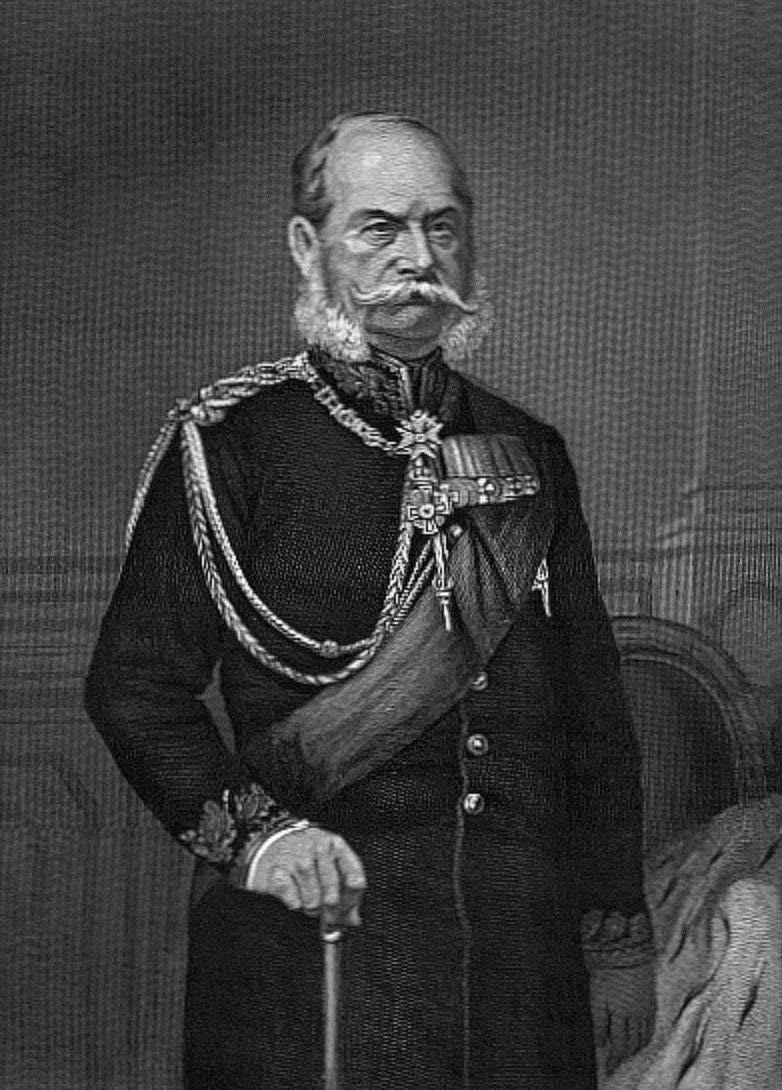
Emperor Wilhelm I, who signed the imperial constitution

The Empire was officially defined as a federation of the member states, with the presidency (Bundespräsidium) a hereditary office of the king of Prussia. As of 1 January 1871, he was granted the additional title of "German Emperor" (Deutscher Kaiser).

Article 11 stated that the emperor had the power to declare war and make peace, represent the Empire abroad, conclude treaties and alliances, and accredit and receive ambassadors. In the case of a non-defensive war being declared, consent of the Bundesrat was required. Both the Bundesrat and the Reichstag had to approve treaties and laws in order for them to be ratified.

He had other powers:

- to convene the Bundesrat and the Reichstag (Article 12); the Bundesrat had to be convened once one-third of its members voted for it (Article 14)
- to execute and publish imperial laws (Article 17)
- to appoint and dismiss imperial officials (Article 18).

== Chancellor ==
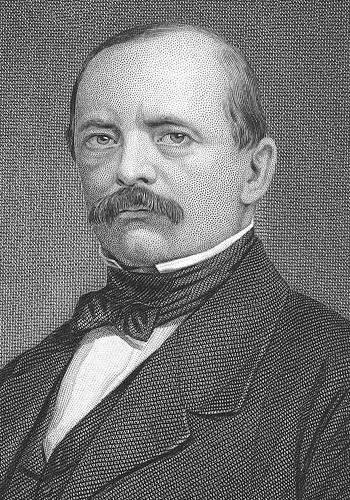
Chancellor Otto von Bismarck, the architect of the Constitution of the German Empire, in 1873

The emperor exercised his powers with the assistance of the chancellor of the Empire (Reichskanzler), whom he appointed. The chancellor presided over the Bundesrat and supervised the conduct of its business. He had the right to delegate the power to represent him to any member of the Bundesrat. (Article 15)

Constitutionally, the chancellor's only functions were to chair the Bundesrat's meetings and implement its resolutions. He had neither a seat nor a vote in the chamber and could not propose legislation. In practice, however, the chancellor was almost always the minister president of Prussia as well. As such he could act as a member of the Bundesrat, speak in the Reichstag, introduce legislation and control the 17 Prussian votes in the Bundesrat.

Decrees and ordinances of the emperor required the counter-signature of the chancellor to be valid (Article 17).

The chancellor was the only minister named in the constitution. The state secretaries (Staatssekretäre) who headed important Reich-level offices such as Foreign Affairs came to function much like ministers in other constitutional monarchies.

== Legislation ==
Per Article 5, imperial laws were enacted following passage by a simple majority in both the Reichstag (lower house) and the Bundesrat (Federal Council). The laws took precedence over those of the individual states (Article 2).

Article 13 required the annual convocation of both bodies. The Bundesrat could be called together for the preparation of business without the Reichstag, but not the converse.

=== Bundesrat ===
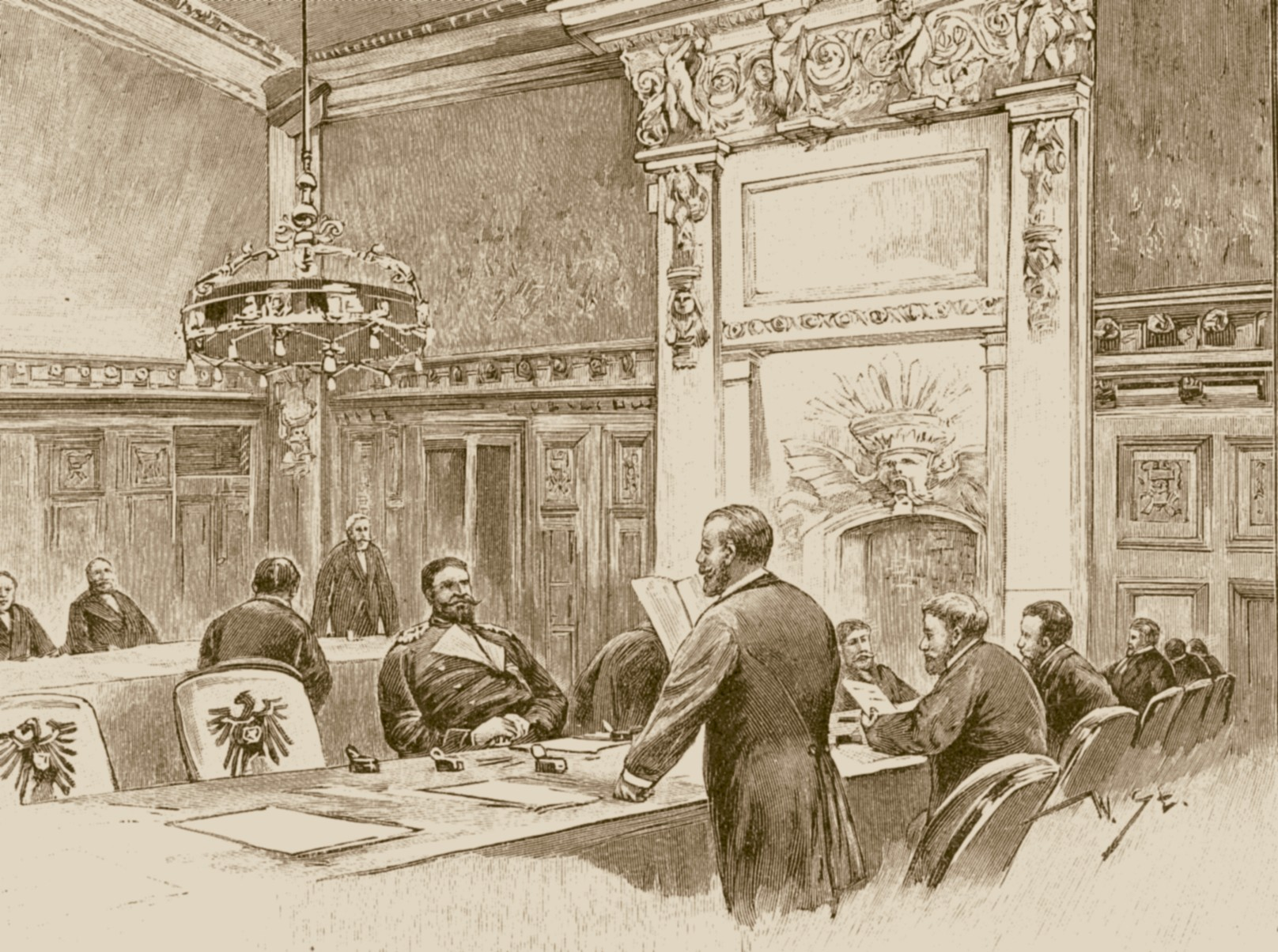
The chamber of the Bundesrat in the Reichstag building, 1894

The Bundesrat ("Federal Council") was made up of representatives of the Empire's contingent states. In German constitutional and imperial law, it combined legislative and executive with limited judicial powers and was thus a constitutional hybrid, although foreign commentators tended to consider it an upper house.

Each state was allocated a specified number of votes (Article 6), with the larger and more powerful states having more. The delegates from each state voted as a bloc. Voting had to be in person, and representatives were bound by the instructions of their state governments (Article 7).

The number of Prussian votes, which was set at 17 in the North German Constitution, remained unchanged in the Empire. In spite of the fact that Prussia had about two-thirds of Germany's population, its percentage of seats in the Bundesrat was just under 28%. Its 17 votes nevertheless were sufficient to block constitutional amendments. Only fourteen negative votes were required to do so (Article 68).

In the case of legislation affecting only certain states, those states alone were allowed to vote (Article 7). The Bundesrat's presiding officer could break ties. A representative could not be a member of both the Bundesrat and the Reichstag at the same time (Article 9) and had "diplomatic" protection (Article 10).

The apportionment of the Bundesrat in 1871–1919 was:

State	Notes	Votes
Prussia	Including states annexed in 1866	17
Bavaria		6
Saxony		4
Württemberg		4
Baden		3
Hesse		3
Mecklenburg-Schwerin		2
Brunswick		2
17 other small states	Each with 1 vote	17
Alsace-Lorraine	After 1911	3
Total		61

==== Permanent committees ====
The constitution established permanent committees in the Bundesrat (Article 8):

- The army, including fortifications
- Naval matters
- Duties and taxation
- Commerce and trade
- The railways, post, and telegraphs
- Justice
- Finance

At least four states had to be represented on each committee, excluding the chairman. Each state was allowed one vote.

On the committee for the army and fortifications, Bavaria had a permanent seat. All of that committee's members were appointed by the emperor; members of all the other committees were elected by the Bundesrat.

Additionally, there was a Committee on Foreign Affairs, chaired by Bavaria, with individual members representing Bavaria, Saxony, and Württemberg, and two other members representing the other states.

=== Reichstag ===
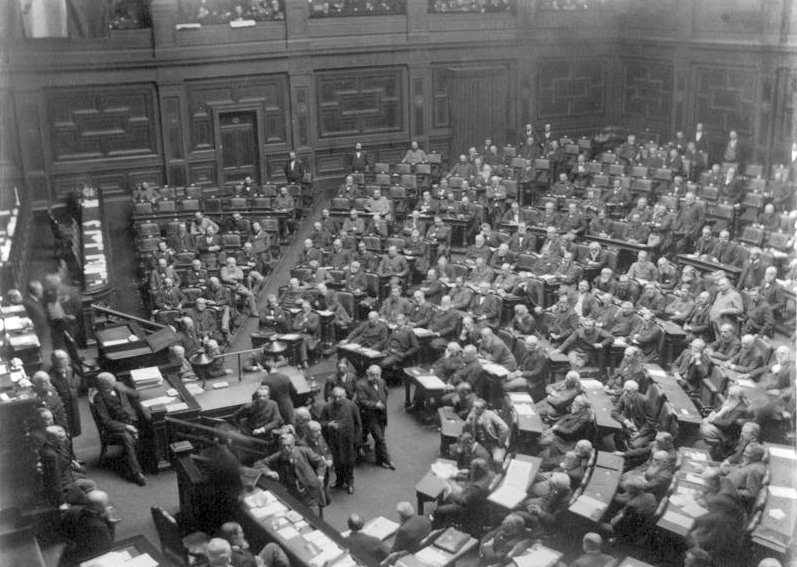
Reichstag in 1889

Members of the Reichstag (parliament or Imperial Diet) were elected by universal manhood suffrage. Qualifications were based on the North German electoral law of 31 May 1869, which granted suffrage for all male citizens over 25 years of age. A direct election using a secret ballot was guaranteed (Article 20).

Bills were laid before the Reichstag in the name of the emperor, in accordance with a resolution of the Bundesrat, and advocated by members of the Bundesrat or by special commissioners appointed by it (Article 16).

=== Powers ===
Article 4 detailed the areas for which the Empire was responsible, or was entitled to legislate on:

- Business activity
- Matters concerning natives of one state who were resident in another
- Citizenship
- Surveillance of foreign individuals and businesses
- Issuing of passports
- Insurance business (with some exceptions for Bavaria)
- Colonial activity
- Emigration
- Administration of imperial revenue
- Regulation of weights and measures
- Coinage and the issuing of paper money
- Banking
- Intellectual property
- Protection of German trade and shipping outside of the country
- Consular representation abroad
- Railways (with some exceptions for Bavaria)
- Road and canal construction for means of national defence
- Management of inter-state shipping
- Post and telegraphic services (with some exceptions for Bavaria and Württemberg)
- Authentication of public documents
- Civil law, including its administration
- Criminal law, including its administration
- Imperial Army and Navy
- Supervision of the medical and veterinary professions.
- Press
- Trade unions

== Citizenship ==
A single German citizenship was created, with equal treatment of citizens within each state guaranteed by Article 3. Until 1913, a person held the citizenship of the Empire as a result of holding the citizenship of one of the states. Therefore, initially, the criteria for becoming a citizen (the rules of acquisition of citizenship by descent, birth, marriage, legitimation, for a German through admission, or through naturalization), were laid down by the separate laws of the individual states. Only on 22 July 1913 was a common uniform nationality law for the Empire – the Nationality Law of the German Empire and States (Reichs- und Staatsangehörigkeitsgesetz) – adopted.

== Officials ==
Imperial officials were appointed and dismissed by the emperor. They were required to take an oath of allegiance. Imperial officials appointed from one of the states were guaranteed the same rights as given them by their native state. (Article 18)

== Amendments ==
The constitution was amended on 20 December 1873 by the Lex Miquel-Lasker to make the entirety of civil law the responsibility of the Empire. On 1 January 1900, a national civil code was promulgated as the Bürgerliches Gesetzbuch.

In 1911 the constitution was amended to treat the Imperial Territory of Alsace–Lorraine as a state in some regards, including limited voting power in the Bundesrat.

The constitution was heavily amended in the waning days of World War I. The amended document, known as the "October Constitution" (Oktoberverfassung) was debated and passed by the Reichstag in late October 1918. The most important changes were:

- Declarations of war and peace treaties required the assent of the Reichstag.
- Members of the government (ministers) could simultaneously be members of the Reichstag.
- The chancellor and ministers required the confidence of the Reichstag rather than that of the emperor. They were accountable for the conduct of their affairs to the Reichstag and the Bundesrat.
- The chancellor was responsible for all political actions of the emperor.
- The emperor's rights to appoint, promote or reassign military officers were limited by requiring the co-signature of the chancellor or the minister of war. The minister of war was accountable to the Bundesrat and Reichstag.

The changes came into force on 28 October, transforming the authoritarian Empire into a parliamentary monarchy.

One month later, with the Germany's defeat in World War I and the November Revolution, the monarchy ceased to exist, and the amended 1871 constitution technically became obsolete. Formally, however, it remained in force and was not changed until 10 February 1919 by the Law on Provisional Reich Authority (Gesetz über die vorläufige Reichsgewalt) passed by the Weimar National Assembly. The Transitional Law (Übergangsgesetz) of 4 March 1919 stipulated explicitly that the 1871 constitution was still valid except where in contradiction to laws passed since November 1918. The Constitution of the Weimar Republic, which completely replaced the imperial constitution, came into force on 14 August 1919.

== See also ==
- Basic Law for the Federal Republic of Germany
- Kommandogewalt
