= November Treaties =

1870 treaties leading to unification of Germany

The November Treaties (German: Novemberverträge) were three treaties concluded during the Franco-Prussian War in November 1870 which laid the constitutional framework for the founding of the German Empire in January 1871. The treaties were between the North German Confederation under the leadership of the Kingdom of Prussia and the four remaining sovereign German states: the Grand Duchies of Baden and Hesse and the Kingdoms of Bavaria and Württemberg.

== Background ==
=== Franco-Prussian War ===
The North German Confederation (1867–1870) with a red border and Prussia in blue; Bavaria and the Bavarian Palatinate (light green border), Württemberg (light yellow), Baden (light brown) and Hesse-Darmstadt (dark brown)

During the course of the Franco-Prussian War (1870–1871), Prussia's military successes made the unification of Germany an increasing likelihood. After Prussia's 1866 victory over the Austrian Empire in the Austro-Prussian War, the German question of whether German unification would proceed with or without Austria had essentially been settled in favor of the Lesser Germany solution under Prussia's leadership. Chancellor Otto von Bismarck of the North German Confederation therefore pushed for the four sovereign south German states, which were not a part of the North German Confederation, to join it and complete the formation of a united Germany.

=== Positions of the south German states ===
The Grand Duchy of Baden was fully behind a Lesser German unification. Grand Duke Frederick I and Minister-President Julius Jolly voiced their desire to join on 3 September 1870. They had applied to join the North German Confederation in 1867 and again in the spring of 1870, but the North German Reichstag, at Bismarck's instigation, rejected their request on foreign policy considerations.

The Kingdom of Württemberg favored a Greater Germany that would include Austria. Under the influence of the Württemberg German Party, the cabinet of King Charles I sent an envoy to the German military headquarters in France on 12 September to conduct negotiations with the North German Confederation on unification.

The government of the Grand Duchy of Hesse also leaned towards a Greater Germany, but Upper Hesse and all of Hesse's troops had already become part of the North German Confederation, which put the government under Grand Duke Ludwig III in a difficult position. The majority of the people and the heir to the throne, who later became Ludwig IV, were in favor of the Lesser Germany solution. The government therefore abandoned the idea of a Greater Germany and entered into negotiations with the North German Confederation.

Of the four sovereign states, the Kingdom of Bavaria was the most strongly opposed to a Lesser Germany. King Ludwig II was determined to maintain Bavaria's autonomy and independence. In order to avoid becoming isolated as the other south German states entered negotiations, Bavaria proposed a constitutional alliance which would have resulted in a new federation and federal constitution. Bavaria had obtained a written promise (the Kaiserbrief) from Prussian King Wilhelm I that he would preserve Bavaria's independence and integrity. Under the Treaty of 23 November 1870 between the North German Confederation and the Kingdom of Bavaria, Bavaria retained not only cultural and fiscal sovereignty but also numerous other reserve rights such as an autonomous army, postal service and railways. In January 1871, the Bavarian state parliament accepted the treaty after considerable resistance.

== Signing ==
Preparatory conferences were held in Munich from 22 to 26 September 1870. Bavaria's resistance gradually broke down, in part due to individual talks with Otto von Bismarck in October. Baden and Hesse submitted applications for membership in October, further increasing the pressure on both Bavaria and Württemberg.

At the end of October, while the siege of Paris was still underway, negotiations began at the German military headquarters near Versailles with the representatives of the four south German states. Representatives of the Kingdom of Saxony were also included. The result of the negotiations was the agreement to transform the North German Confederation into a German Confederation through the accession of the southern German states. The North German Constitution was to become the Constitution of the German Confederation.

The agreement with the four acceding states was concluded in the constitutional treaties of November 1870 and in two separate military conventions. In the 15 November treaty between the North German Confederation and Baden and Hesse, the North German Constitution was adopted largely unaltered. It changed the name of the North German Confederation to the "German Confederation" even though the ratifications of the relevant treaties were still pending.

After negotiations with Bavaria and Württemberg, the North German Constitution and the most important laws of the North German Confederation were modified. Overall, the federal elements were emphasised more strongly than in the North German Constitution of 1867. Bavaria acceded to the treaty between the North German Confederation and Baden and Hesse on 23 November in Berlin, and Württemberg followed two days later. All of the treaties came into force on 1 January 1871, marking the formal birthdate of the German Empire.

Because the North German Constitution had been amended, the November Treaties required the approval of the parliaments of the North German Confederation and the four acceding states. The parliaments of Württemberg, Baden and Hesse ratified the treaties in December 1870; Bavaria's was delayed until 21 January 1871 and therefore had to be made retroactive. All of the votes had clear majorities. On 8 December 1870, the Federal Council (Bundesrat) of the North German Confederation voted in favour of changing the Confederation's name to "German Empire" and made the King of Prussia the "German Emperor". The amendment of the constitution passed the North German Reichstag on 10 December 1870.

== Results ==
The November Treaties prepared the ground for the foundation of the empire by regulating the conditions of accession of the southern states. The constitution itself and the political system scarcely changed. Of lasting importance were the special rules (reserve rights) for some southern states. Württemberg and Bavaria were allowed to levy their own excise duties, set their own railway fares and were granted special rights for their postal and telegraph systems. Saxony, Württemberg and Bavaria were allowed to maintain their own semi-autonomous armies within the Imperial German Army. Those rights and other exceptions remained in force until 1918, even if most of them were not made part of the constitutional texts of 1 January or 16 April 1871.

On 18 January 1871 the founding of the German Empire was proclaimed at Versailles. On 3 March a Reichstag election was held in which the four new states took part. In order to bring constitutional law up to date, the Reichstag and Bundesrat ratified the Constitution of the German Empire on 16 April 1871. Along with the amendments that had been added to the Constitution of the German Confederation for Baden and Hesse, it included the terms of the November Treaties for Bavaria and Württemberg.

== See also ==
- Constitution of the German Confederation 1871
