= North German Confederation =

Northern German state from 1866 to 1871

Coordinates: 52°31′N 13°24′E

North German Confederation Norddeutscher Bund
- 1866–1871
- Flag Coat of arms

- The North German Confederation in 1870

- The North German Confederation (red). The southern German states that joined in 1871 to form the German Empire are in orange. Alsace–Lorraine, the territory annexed following the Franco-Prussian War of 1870–1871, is in tan. The red territory in the south marks the Province of Hohenzollern, the original principality of the House of Hohenzollern, rulers of the Kingdom of Prussia.
- Capital: Berlin
- Religion: Majority: Protestantism Minorities: Catholicism, Judaism
- Demonym: North German
- Government: Confederal semi-presidential semi-constitutional monarchy
- President
  - 1867–1871: Wilhelm I
- Chancellor
  - 1867–1871: Otto von Bismarck
- Legislature: Bicameral
  - Upper house: Bundesrat
  - Lower house: Reichstag
- Historical era: New Imperialism
  - Confederation Treaty: 18 August 1866
  - Peace of Prague; German Confederation dissolved: 23 August 1866
  - Constitution adopted: 16 April 1867
  - Accession of southern states; German Empire adopted as name: 1 January 1871
  - Empire proclaimed: 18 January 1871
  - Constitution of the Empire: 4 May 1871
- Currency: Vereinsthaler
Preceded by
German Confederation (Note: de facto, except Austrian Empire, Duchy of Limburg (1839–1867), Grand Duchy of Luxembourg and Principality of Liechtenstein)
Duchy of Schleswig
Province of Prussia
Province of Posen
Kingdom of Prussia
Succeeded by
German Empire

Map of the North German Confederation. Prussia is shown in blue.

The North German Confederation (German: Norddeutscher Bund) (Note: An alternative translation is "North German Federation". The German word Bund is used in German constitutional history (a) for confederations (associations of states, in German Staatenbund) such as the German Confederation of 1815 and (b) for federations (federal states, in German Bundesstaat or Föderaler Staat) such as the Federal Republic of Germany or the United States of America.) was a confederated state that united the region of Germany north of the Main river from July 1867 to December 1870. It was a milestone of German Unification that put the Kingdom of Prussia at the head of the emerging nation and led to the exclusion of Austria from the eventual united Germany.

The Confederation was formed following the victory of Prussia and its allies over the Austrian Empire in the Austro-Prussian War of 1866. The North German Confederation's constitution established a semi-presidential, semi-constitutional monarchy with the Prussian king as head of state. Its two-chamber parliament consisted of an appointed Federal Council (Bundesrat) representing the states and a popular assembly, the Reichstag, elected under universal manhood suffrage. During the three-and-a-half year life of the Confederation, it took important steps to unify the nation legally and administratively.

The states of the North German Confederation became the core of the German Empire when it was founded on 18 January 1871 after the German victory over France in the Franco-Prussian War.

== Prelude ==
=== German Confederation (1815–1866) ===
The German Confederation, the main predecessor state of the North German Confederation, was created in 1815 by the Congress of Vienna, the gathering of major powers that reconfigured the political map of Europe after the Napoleonic Wars. The Confederation consisted of 39 states in a loose, largely defense-oriented federation dominated by the Austrian Empire and the Kingdom of Prussia. There was no attempt to create a unified German nation-state, as many Germans who had fought in the Wars of Liberation against Napoleon had hoped.

=== German Customs Union ===
Prussia established the German Customs Union (Zollverein) in 1834 in order to modernize and strengthen its economy. Over time it came to include almost all of the states of the German Confederation except Austria. It did not join in part because it wanted the protections provided by high tariffs. The commercial union that the Zollverein created was independent of any political union. Although it strengthened Prussia's position in non-Austrian Germany, it did little to resolve the German question as to whether an eventual unified Germany would or would not include Austria.

=== Revolution of 1848 ===
A wave of revolutionary unrest spread across Europe in 1848. Among the calls for economic, social and political reform that were part of the revolutions of 1848, there were also demands for unification in the states of the German Confederation. In May 1848 the Frankfurt National Assembly gathered to draw up a constitution for the proposed new nation-state of Germany. One of the main issues that divided the delegates was whether unification should exclude Austria (a Lesser Germany) or include it (Greater Germany). It opted for the Lesser Germany path after Austria proclaimed a new constitution which stated that either all of the Empire or none of it must become part of the new Germany. After Prussia rejected the Frankfurt Constitution, the Parliament, lacking the support of both of the major German nations, broke up in failure, as did the revolution as a whole in the months afterwards.

=== Austro-Prussian War (1866) ===
In 1866, the long-running tensions between Austria and Prussia broke out into the open hostilities of the Austro-Prussian War. The immediate cause was disagreement over the administration of the Duchies of Schleswig and Holstein. The majority of the largest states of the German Confederation – the kingdoms of Bavaria, Saxony and Württemberg among others – sided with Austria in the war, while Prussia's allies were mostly smaller north German states.

When Austria and its supporters decided to mobilize, Minister President Otto von Bismarck of Prussia withdrew the kingdom from the German Confederation and declared it dissolved. The fighting lasted barely over a month and ended in a Prussian victory. In the Peace of Prague, Prussia annexed Schleswig, Holstein and many of the north German states that had fought on Austria's side. Austria agreed to step back from taking any part in German affairs and to accept the creation of a North German Confederation under Prussia's leadership. That left Prussia without competition as the dominant power in Germany. The supporters of a Greater Germany had lost to the Lesser Germany solution.

== Formation of the North German Confederation ==
=== Creation ===
On 18 August 1866, Prussia and fifteen north and central German states signed the North German Confederation Treaty. It created an "offensive and defensive alliance for the preservation of the independence and integrity, as well as the internal and external security of their states". It was to last for a maximum of one year, although less if a "new federal relationship" was agreed on sooner. The federal relationship was to be defined by a constitution based on the Prussian proposal for a federal state of June 1866. All the states were to send delegates to Berlin to draft the constitution and at the same time to order that elections for representatives to a parliament be held on the basis of the Imperial Election Law of 12 April 1849. That law, drafted by the Frankfurt Parliament, mandated universal, equal and direct manhood suffrage.

Prussia annexed outright four of its former opponents in the war. Hanover, the Electorate of Hesse (Hesse-Kassel), Nassau and Frankfurt, along with the Hesse-Homburg area of the Grand Duchy of Hesse, were combined into the two new Prussian provinces of Hanover and Hesse-Nassau. Four other states that had fought for Austria – the northern part of Hesse, Reuss-Greiz, Saxe-Meiningen, and the Kingdom of Saxony – became part of the North German Confederation, but not of Prussia, through individual treaties. Mecklenburg-Schwerin and Mecklenburg-Strelitz also joined by treaty. Schleswig and Holstein became the Prussian Province of Schleswig-Holstein. East Prussia, Posen and West Prussia, which had not been part of the German Confederation even though they were provinces of the Kingdom of Prussia, also became part of the new north German alliance.

The North German Confederation was the earliest continual legal predecessor of the modern German nation-state known today as the Federal Republic of Germany.

=== Federal constitution ===
The election for the constituent North German Reichstag took place on 12 February 1867. The 297 seats were divided among more than a dozen parties, with the largest shares going to the National Liberal Party (78 seats), the Conservative Party (63 seats) and the Free Conservative Party (39 seats). The National Liberals were able to form a majority coalition with the Free Conservatives, Old Liberals and a handful of independents. The draft of a constitution that adhered to guidelines set by Otto von Bismarck was waiting for the delegates when they convened on 24 February 1867. In its fundamental form, the draft proposed a federal state led by Prussia. Most delegates were favorable to federalism, although some National Liberals and most of the liberal Progress Party fought unsuccessfully for a unitary state. The constituent Reichstag modified the draft to give the chancellor more power and made the military subject to the budgetary oversight of the legislature. The revised constitution was passed on 16 April 1867 by a vote of 230 to 53. Voting against were the Progress Party, many Catholics, August Bebel – a founder of one of the predecessors to the Social Democratic Party – and the Polish Reichstag members. After the constitution had been approved by the parliaments of the constituent states, it went into effect on 1 July 1867. Two weeks later, King Wilhelm I appointed Bismarck chancellor of the Confederation.

Chart illustrating the constitution of the North German Confederation

Since Bismarck wanted a loosely organized confederation in which sovereignty rested with the individual states as a whole, the Bundesrat, the body representing the states, constituted the Confederation's sovereign. Its members were chosen by the states' governments. The members of the lower house of parliament, the Reichstag, were elected by universal manhood suffrage. The Reichstag participated on an equal footing with the Bundesrat in legislation. Laws had to pass both houses by a majority vote in order to be adopted. The chancellor, who presided over the Bundesrat, was appointed and dismissed by the king of Prussia and was responsible only to him. The king was head of state and was responsible for executing federal laws passed by the parliament but had no veto right. He was also commander-in-chief of the federal army and navy and could declare war and make peace.

The Confederation was dominated by Prussia. It had four-fifths of the Confederation's territory and population, more than the other 21 members combined. The Prussian king was head of state, and Bismarck, along with being the Confederation's chancellor, was also prime minister and foreign minister of Prussia. In that role he instructed the Prussian votes in the Bundesrat. The constitution gave Prussia just 17 of 43 votes (40%) in the Bundesrat, but it could form a majority by making alliances with the smaller states. Since it took a two-thirds majority (29 votes) to pass a constitutional amendment, Prussia could also block any major changes it did not want.

== Life of the nation-state ==
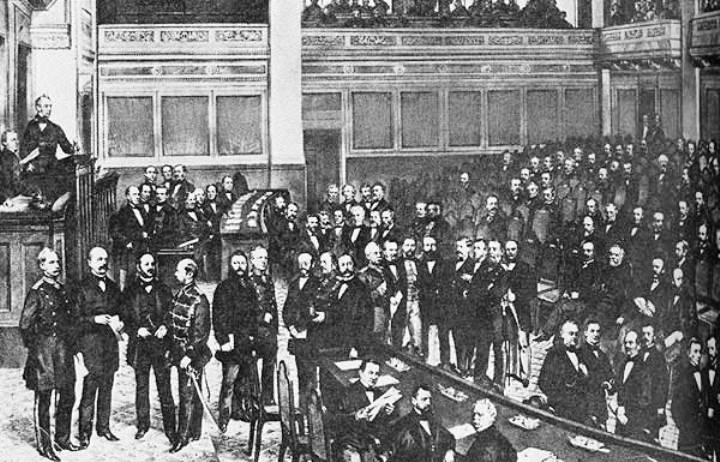
First session of the constituent North German Reichstag on 24 February 1867

The constituent Reichstag was replaced by the first (and only) regular Reichstag of the North German Empire following the election of August 1867. The National Liberals again won the most seats (80 of 297), followed by the Conservative Party (66) and the Free Conservatives (36). During the three-and-a-half year life of the North German Confederation, the Reichstag's major legislative activity was driven by the National Liberals and centered around unifying the new nation legally and administratively. Laws were enacted concerning:

- free movement of citizens within the territory of the Confederation (1867)
- a common postal system (1867–1868)
- common passports (1867)
- equal rights for all religious denominations, including Jews (1869)
- unified measures and weights, with the obligatory introduction of the metric system
- unifying the penal code, although the changes came without abolition of the death penalty, which was the National Liberals' main objective in the field (1870)

The Liberals made no immediate progress towards their most important goal, which was the completion of German unification. Bismarck knew that bringing the southern German states into the union would mean war with France, and he felt that the time and circumstances were not right for running the risks of a war.

=== Restructured customs union ===
Prussia restructured the German Customs Union after the Austro-Prussian War in order to draw the south German states (Bavaria, Württemberg, Baden and Hesse-Darmstadt) into closer ties with the North German Confederation. A new federal council for the Customs Union (the Zollbundesrat) was created from the Confederation's Bundesrat plus representatives of the south German states. The North German Reichstag sat as the Customs Union parliament with the addition of 85 south German members. There was a single election to the Zollparlament in 1868. The south German representatives were for the most part opposed to Bismarck's policies, and when combined with the members of the North German Reichstag, they gave the opposition a majority in the Customs Union Parliament.

Mecklenburg-Schwerin, Mecklenburg-Strelitz and the three Hanseatic cities of Bremen, Hamburg and Lübeck were initially not members of the Customs Union. The Mecklenburgs (1868) and Lübeck (1869) joined soon after the North German Confederation was formed. After heavy Prussian pressure, Hamburg acceded to the Customs Union in 1888; Bremen joined at the same time. All the states participated fully in the federal institutions even while outside the Customs Union and not directly affected by its decisions.

=== Transition to the German Empire ===
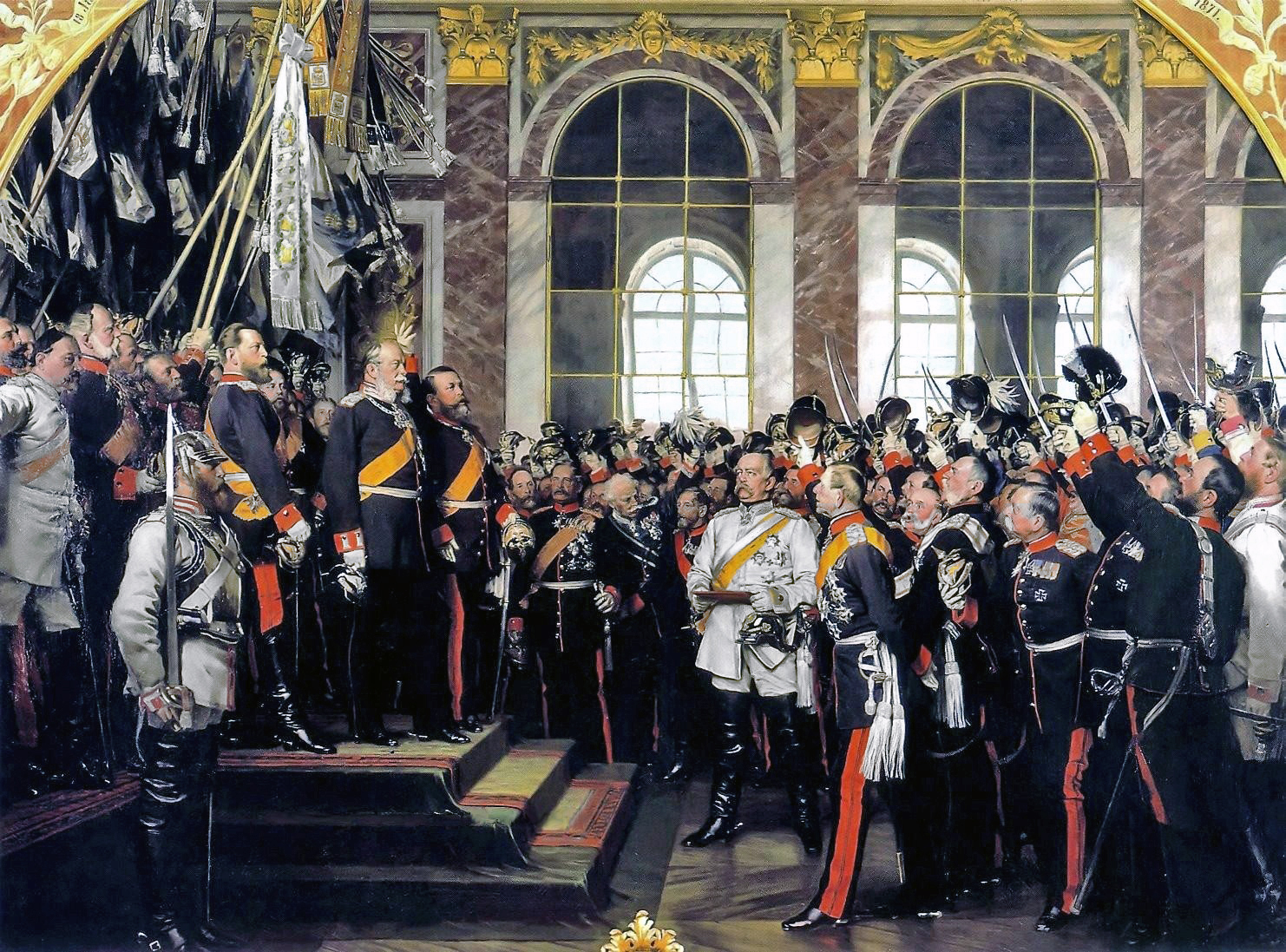
Third version of Anton von Werner's Proclamation of the German Empire (painted 1885)

In mid-1870, Bismarck used France's resistance to putting a member of the Prussian house of Hohenzollern on the throne of Spain to help spark the war that he considered necessary to complete Germany's unification. German patriotism in the face of the French "affront" would, he thought, be sufficient to overcome the south German states' particularism. In addition, secret treaties signed in 1866 bound them in mutual defense pacts with Prussia. The four states fought with the North German Confederation against France in the Franco-Prussian War and in November 1870 signed treaties that brought them into the Confederation. On 8 December 1870, the Bundesrat of the North German Confederation voted in favour of changing the Confederation's name to Deutsches Reich (conventionally translated as "German Empire") and made the king of Prussia the German Emperor (Deutscher Kaiser). An amendment to the constitution accepting the south German states passed the North German Reichstag on 10 December 1870. The 1871 Constitution of the German Confederation became effective on 1 January 1871.

According to a minority among German experts, the North German Confederation and the southern states created a new federal state (the German Empire). Indeed, Bismarck allowed the south German states to save face and therefore used terminology suggesting a new creation. Historian Michael Kotulla emphasizes, however, that legally only accession of the southern states to the North German Confederation was possible; the legal basis for such an accession was Article 79 of the North German federal constitution.

Following the North German Confederation's victory in the war with France, the German princes and senior military commanders formally proclaimed Wilhelm the German Emperor in the Hall of Mirrors at the Palace of Versailles on 18 January 1871. The date was customarily celebrated as the day of the German Empire's foundation, although it had no constitutional meaning. After a new Reichstag was elected on 3 March 1871, the transition from the Confederation to the Empire was completed when the Constitution of the German Empire became effective on 4 May 1871. It was a minimally altered version of the Constitution of the North German Confederation. France recognised the Empire on 10 May 1871 in the Treaty of Frankfurt.

== Member states ==
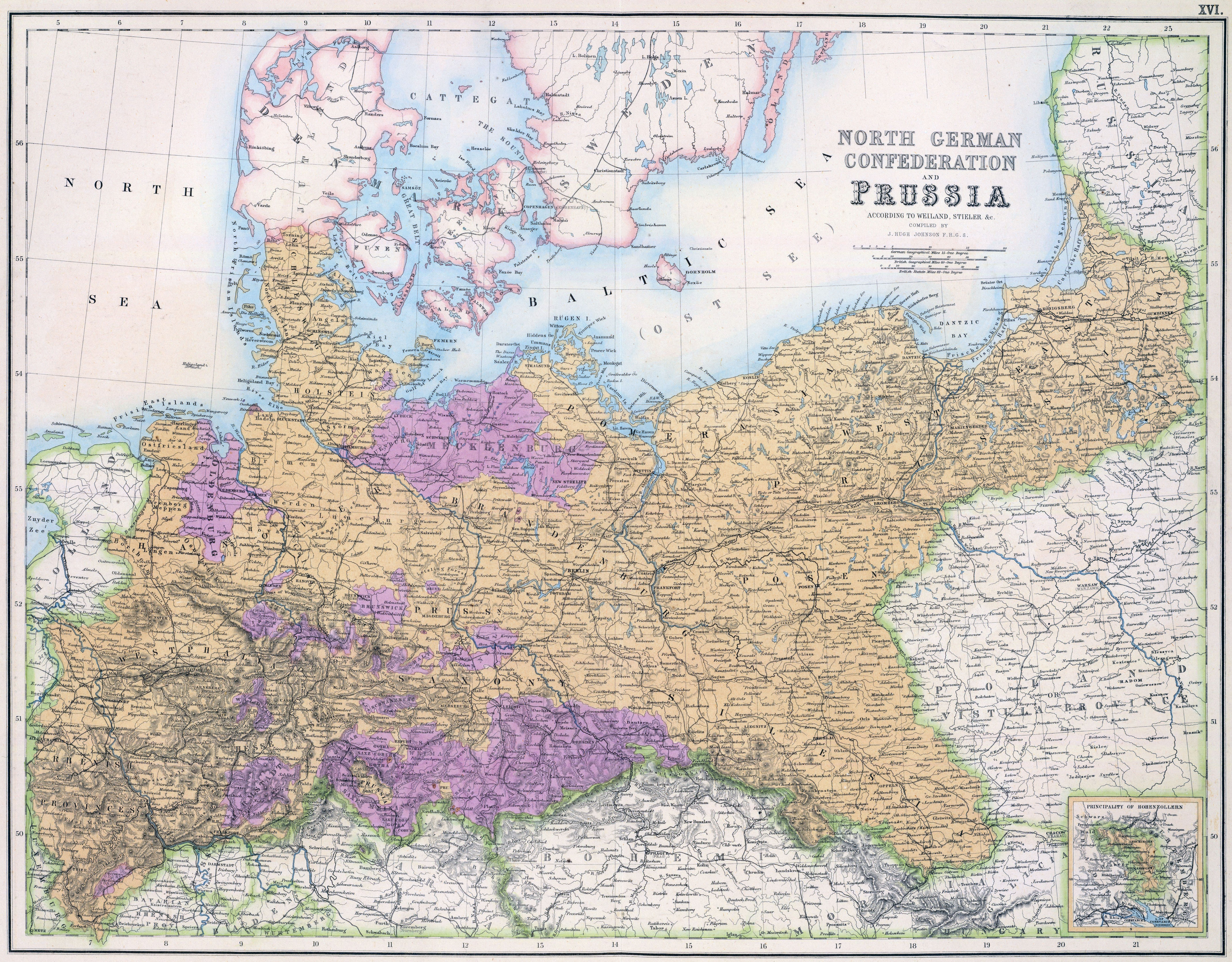
Detailed map of North German Confederation

All of the North German Confederation's member states had belonged to the German Confederation of 1815–1866. Austria and the south German states Bavaria, Württemberg, Baden and the Grand Duchy of Hesse (Hesse-Darmstadt) remained outside of the Confederation, although Oberhessen, the northern province of the Grand Duchy of Hesse, did join.

In northern, central and eastern Germany, Prussia formed the North German Confederation by:

- uniting a number of allies from the Austro-Prussian War that joined the North German Confederation via the August treaties (Augustverträge) of August 1866;
- annexing four former enemy states (Hanover, Kurhessen, Nassau and Frankfurt) which became parts of Prussia (October 1866);
- including its own territories that had formerly been outside of the Holy Roman Empire and the German Confederation. Those were East Prussia, the cradle of Prussian statehood, and the two largely Polish territories of Posen and West Prussia. Their inclusion formally annexed them to the new Germany;
- bringing the remaining north and central German states (such as Saxony) into the North German Confederation via peace treaties.

The Duchy of Saxe-Lauenburg is sometimes included as one of the member states, but it was not a separate member state enumerated in the constitution of the Confederation. It was one of the three duchies that earlier had belonged to Denmark. Saxe-Lauenburg was ruled in personal union by the Prussian king as its duke until July 1876, when the duchy was incorporated into the Prussian province of Schleswig-Holstein.

=== List of states ===
Flag	State	Capital	Type	Area in km^{2}	Population in 1,000s (1866)	Bundesrat seats
	Anhalt	Dessau	Duchy	2,299	196	1
	Bremen	Bremen	Free City	256	107	1
	Brunswick	Brunswick	Duchy	3,672	298	2
	Hamburg	Hamburg	Free City	415	281	1
	Hesse	Darmstadt	Grand Duchy	3,287	119 (Note: in 1858)	1
	Lippe	Detmold	Principality	1,215	112	1
Free City of Lübeck	Lübeck	Lübeck	Free City	299	48	1
	Mecklenburg-Schwerin	Schwerin	Grand Duchy	13,162	560	2
	Mecklenburg-Strelitz	Neustrelitz	Grand Duchy	2,930	99	1
	Oldenburg	Oldenburg	Grand Duchy	6,427	303	1
	Prussia (Note: including the 1867 annexations)	Berlin	Kingdom	348,607	23,971	17
	Reuss-Gera (junior line)	Gera	Principality	827	87	1
	Reuss-Greiz (senior line)	Greiz	Principality	317	44	1
	Saxe-Altenburg	Altenburg	Duchy	1,324	142	1
	Saxe-Coburg and Gotha	Coburg, Gotha	Duchy	1,958	167	1
	Saxe-Lauenburg (Note: Not formally a state of the Confederation. Included here for completeness of the Confederation's area and population.)	Lauenburg	Duchy (Note: with the Prussian king as duke)	1,182	50 (Note: c. 1857)	0
	Saxe-Meiningen	Meiningen	Duchy	2,468	180	1
	Saxe-Weimar-Eisenach	Weimar	Grand Duchy	3,615	281	1
	Saxony	Dresden	Kingdom	14,993	2,383	4
	Schaumburg-Lippe	Bückeburg	Principality	340	32	1
	Schwarzburg-Rudolstadt	Rudolstadt	Principality	941	75	1
Schwarzburg Sondershausen	Schwarzburg-Sondershausen	Sondershausen	Principality	862	67	1
Germany	Waldeck and Pyrmont	Arolsen	Principality	1,121	58	1
Total				412,517	29,660	43

== See also ==
- North German Constitution
- Former countries in Europe after 1815
- German unification
- Postage stamps and postal history of the North German Confederation
