= Constitution of the German Confederation (1871) =

German constitution in January–May 1871

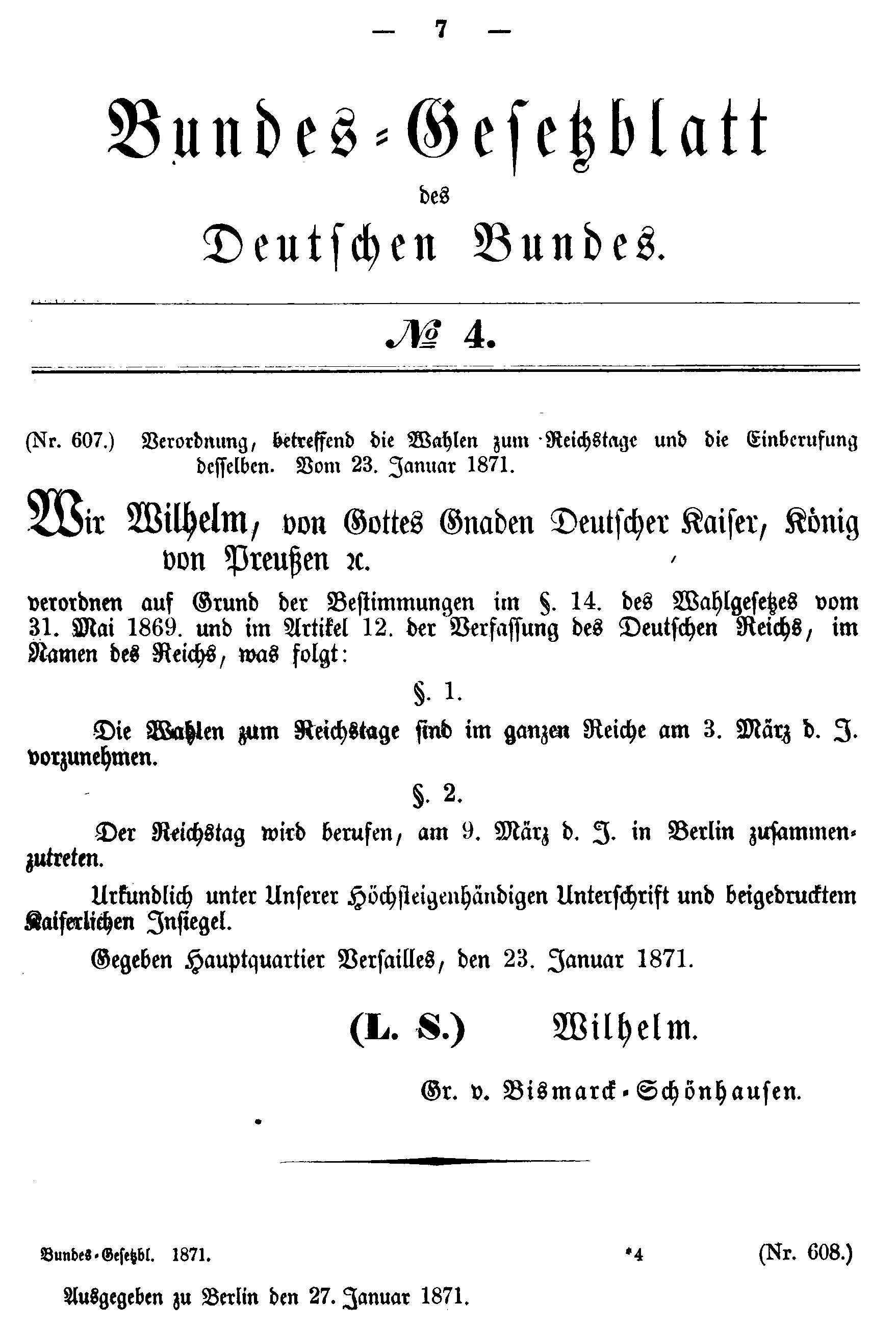
First page of the Bundesgesetzblatt des Deutschen Bundes, 27 January 1871: Emperor Wilhelm I issues new elections to the Reichstag.

The Constitution of the German Confederation (German: Verfassung des Deutschen Bundes) or November Constitution (Novemberverfassung) was the constitution of the German federal state at the beginning of the year 1871. It was enacted on January 1, 1871. This is a slightly changed version of the Constitution of the North German Confederation; it is not to be confused with the constitutional laws of the German Confederation of 1815.

The Constitution of the German Confederation of 1871 incorporated agreements between the North German Confederation and some of the South German states that joined the Confederation: with Baden and Hesse-Darmstadt, but not Bavaria and Württemberg. The new constitution appeared on 31 December 1870 in the Bundesgesetzblatt des Norddeutschen Bundes (North German Federal Law Gazette) and came into effect the following day.

New elections to the Reichstag, the parliament, took place on 3 March. They included for the first time the South German states, also Württemberg and Bavaria. On 16 April 1871 the constitution was replaced with a new constitution which was in effect until the end of the German Empire in 1918.

There are four different constitutions or texts to distinguish between:

1. The 'Constitution of the North German Confederation' (Verfassung des Norddeutschen Bundes, Norddeutsche Bundesverfassung, NBV) from 16 April 1867. It came into effect on 1 July 1867.
2. The 'Constitution of the German Confederation' (Verfassung des Deutschen Bundes) as a text which was added to one of the November treaties: the agreement between the North German Confederation and Hessen-Darmstadt and Baden.
3. The 'Constitution of the German Confederation' (Verfassung des Deutschen Bundes, Deutsche Bundesverfassung, DBV) as the constitutional text which appeared in the Federal Law Gazette on 31 December 1870. The Constitution, in spite of its title, already names the federal state 'German Empire' (Deutsches Reich). It came into effect the following day, 1 January 1871.
4. The 'Constitution of the German Empire' of 16 April 1871, which came into effect on 4 May 1871. This is usually the constitution called the Bismarcksche Reichsverfassung (BRV or RV).

In all of those four texts, the political system remains the same. The changes relate mainly to the agreements with the South German states regarding their accession to the North German Confederation. For example the number of delegates to the Federal Council were adjusted. All this was executed in a rather messy way. Constitutional historian Ernst Rudolf Huber called the constitution of 1 January 1871 a 'Monstrum'.

The constitution of 1 January 1871 was one step from the North German Confederation to the German Empire. Those steps did not create a new state but concerned the accession of the South German states. The North German Confederation was renamed, and some of its organs received a new title. The constitution of 1 January 1871 did have lasting significance in the German Empire despite the new constitution of 16 April 1871: article 80 (not repeated in the constitution of 16 April) which made many North German laws come into force also in the South.
