= Prussianism =

Culture of disciplined Prussian elites

Prussianism comprises the practices and doctrines of the Prussians, specifically the militarism and the severe discipline traditionally associated with the Prussian ruling class.

== History ==
Prussianism had its origins with the rise to the throne of Frederick William I in 1713, who laid the foundations for a professional and stable army; a legacy that was continued by his son Frederick II the Great, who formed an organized and effective army, and later by the latter's nephew Frederick William II.

Prussianism was based on the conservative militaristic caste of the Prussian Junkers, having as a fundamental basis a vertical, centralized, paternalistic and iron discipline. Its ideological underpinning consisted of a combination of the markedly aristocratic, warmongering, and expansionist nationalist ideology, traditionalism, conservatism, and militarism of the time. It was this philosophy that largely influenced the attitude of Prussia and later Germany in historical processes such as the Napoleonic Wars, the unification of Germany and the First World War.

Sociologically, in addition, Prussianism was expressed in the so-called "Prussian virtues", influencing various relevant aspects of German culture.

Among the most important theorists and exponents of Prussianism are Karl von Clausewitz, Otto von Bismarck, and Oswald Spengler.

Prussianism also had an influence in South America, during the 1920s, 1930s, and 1940s, especially in the military circles of Chile, Argentina, Colombia, and Bolivia. In Chile, relations with Prussia date back to the end of the 19th century when a German mission, under the command of Emil Körner, began the process of modernization and professionalization of the Chilean Army. These contacts were maintained and intensified throughout the first half of the 20th century, leading to the "Prussianization" of Chile's military officers, NCOs, and soldiers. This influence also extended to the Chilean Navy and Chilean Air Force, as evidenced during the Great Military Parade of Chile. In Argentina and Bolivia the Prussian model was also used as the basis for military professionalization in those years.

== See also ==
- Borussian myth
- Prussian virtues
- Preussentum und Sozialismus
- Pan-Germanism
- Protestant work ethic
- Imperial German influence on Republican Chile
