= Lesser Germany =

Geopolitical term

The term "Lesser Germany" (German: Kleindeutschland, pronounced [ˌklaɪ̯nˈdɔɪ̯t͡ʃlant]) or "Lesser German solution" (German: Kleindeutsche Lösung) denoted essentially exclusion of the multinational Austria of the Habsburgs from the planned German unification as an option for solving the German question, in opposition to the one of 'Greater Germany'.

In the 19th century, a part of the Austrian Empire belonged to the German Confederation. In the revolutionary era of 1848–1850, it was discussed whether Austria or a part of Austria could belong to a new German federal state. In 1867–1871, the 'Lesser Germany' became reality: a federal state under leadership of Prussia and without Austria. After that, the term lost its significance because since then 'Germany' is usually identified as this Lesser Germany.

The other term, Greater Germany, remained in use for those who sought to incorporate Austria or the German-speaking parts of Austria into Germany. This became a political issue in the aftermath of World War One and then again in 1938–1945. During the Cold War, when Germany was divided, a unified Germany was called 'Gesamtdeutschland'.

== Evolution in the revolutionary era ==
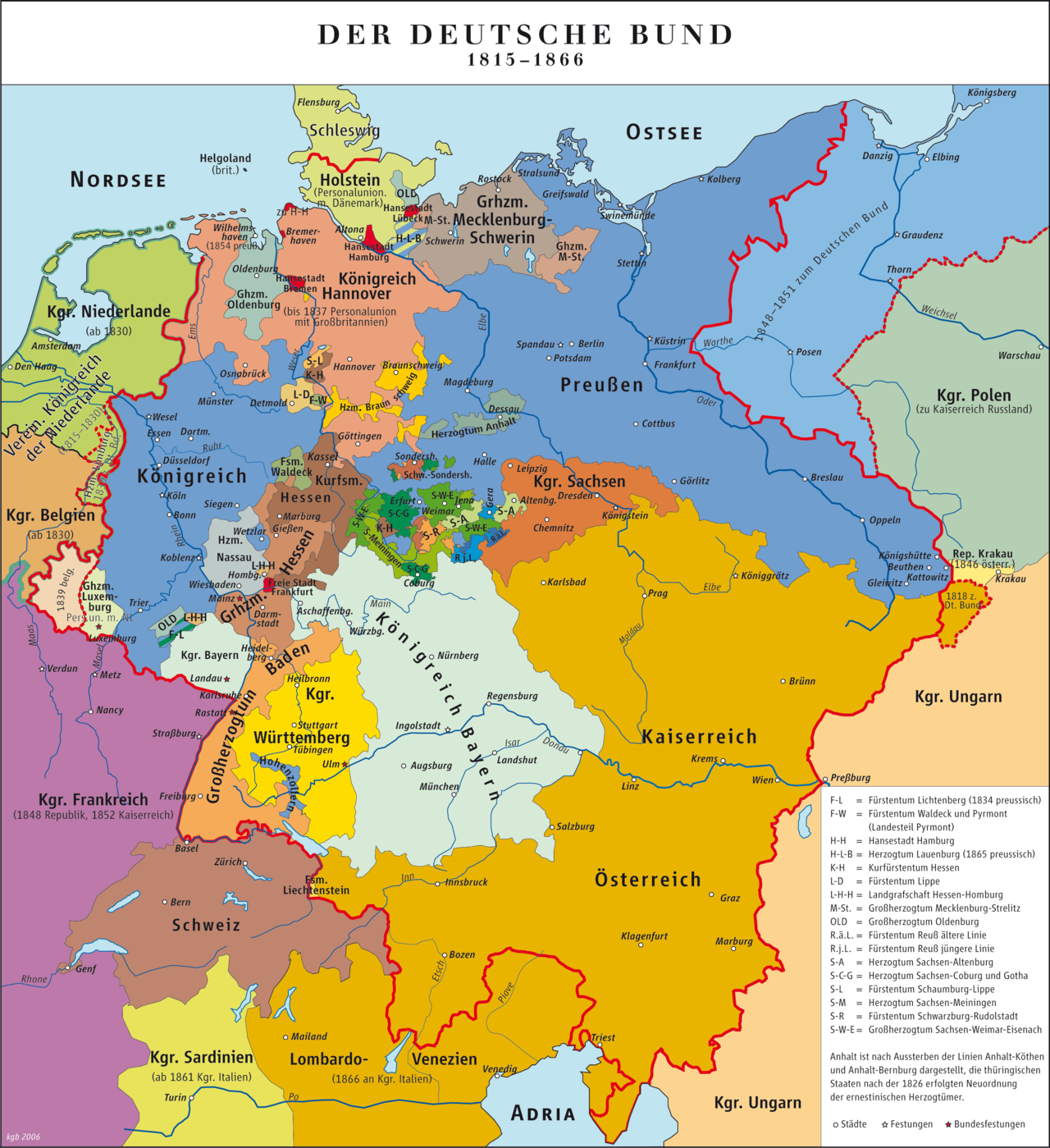
Map of the German Confederation, 1815–1848 and 1851–1866

Since 1815, the German states had belonged to the German Confederation. Its territory was defined essentially after the Holy Roman Empire. As a consequence, the two dominant member states belonged to the confederation only partially, leaving their vast territories such as the original Prussia (renamed East Prussia), the Prussian and Austrian shares of the partitioned Poland, or the Hungarian part of the Austrian Empire, outside of the Confederation. The territory within the confederation was called bundeszugehörig (belonging to the confederation), the other bundesfremd (foreign to the confederation). Only Bundesgebiet (federal territory = territory within the boundaries of the confederation) was protected by the military provisions of the German Confederation.

In March 1848, revolution broke out in Germany and other European countries. The Federal Assembly, the only organ of the German Confederation, elected a National Assembly to work out a constitution for a German federal state. The German National Assembly also installed a provisional head of state (the uncle of the Austrian Emperor) and government. Initially, it was universally accepted that the federal territory of Austria should be a part of the new German state.

During the course of 1848, it became evident that the Austrian government was not willing to live with the consequences of a German federal state. The German National Assembly refused to accept all of Austria, as this would have burdened the new state with the nationality conflicts of Austria. Only the part of Austria that was already federal territory was welcome, even if it included a large ethnic minority (the Czechs). The Hungarian part of the Habsburg Monarchy would have had to be separate in terms of constitution, government and administration. The Austrian Emperor would have been the head of both parts, formed as separate states in a personal union only.

Austria rejected demands for such a division of its imperial territory, as it viewed a personal union as insufficient to ensure integrity of the monarchy. In March 1849, the Austrian Emperor issued a new Austrian constitution which defined Austria as a centralist state. By then, the German National Assembly was already divided in 'Greater Germans' (often Catholics) and 'Lesser Germans'. The latter tendency became in March 1849 the majority. It voted for a German constitution that left open the accession of Austria, but elected the Prussian king to be German Emperor. It also made for the first time a then-failed attempts to expand borders of the Confederation through inclusion of the original nucleus of Prussian statehood (East Prussia), as well as through annexing into the Confederation the Prussian-ruled share of the dismembered Polish state, enjoying a degree of autonomy and consisting of Pomerelia (renamed West Prussia), the Lauenburg and Bütow Land, as well as the Greater Poland (renamed Grand Duchy of Posen). Attempts to annex the territories populated with Poles were based on an assessment that future successful Germanisation of these lands would be feasible, in contrast to the Hungarian lands. The planned annexations elicited an immediate armed response of the Poles in the form of the Greater Poland uprising (1848) and were as a result abandoned for the time being. In spite of their failure at the time, the assembly did succeed, however, in demoting the Grand Duchy to an ordinary Province of Posen.

In an unexpected turn of events, the Prussian king refused, however, to accept in April the offered crown of the nascent German Empire (1848–1849), primarily due to his negative perception of the form of the planned empire as designed by the Frankfurt Constitution, thus causing abortion of the efforts to establish the state. Nevertheless, he followed in the immediate aftermath with further steps to unify Germany, but on his own absolutist terms, initially through a project that was later called the 'Erfurt Union'. Austria was not invited to become part of this version of Lesser Germany. Joseph von Radowitz, adviser to the Prussian king and actual leader of the project, tried to bind Austria and the Union together in a confederation.

== Evolution after 1850 ==
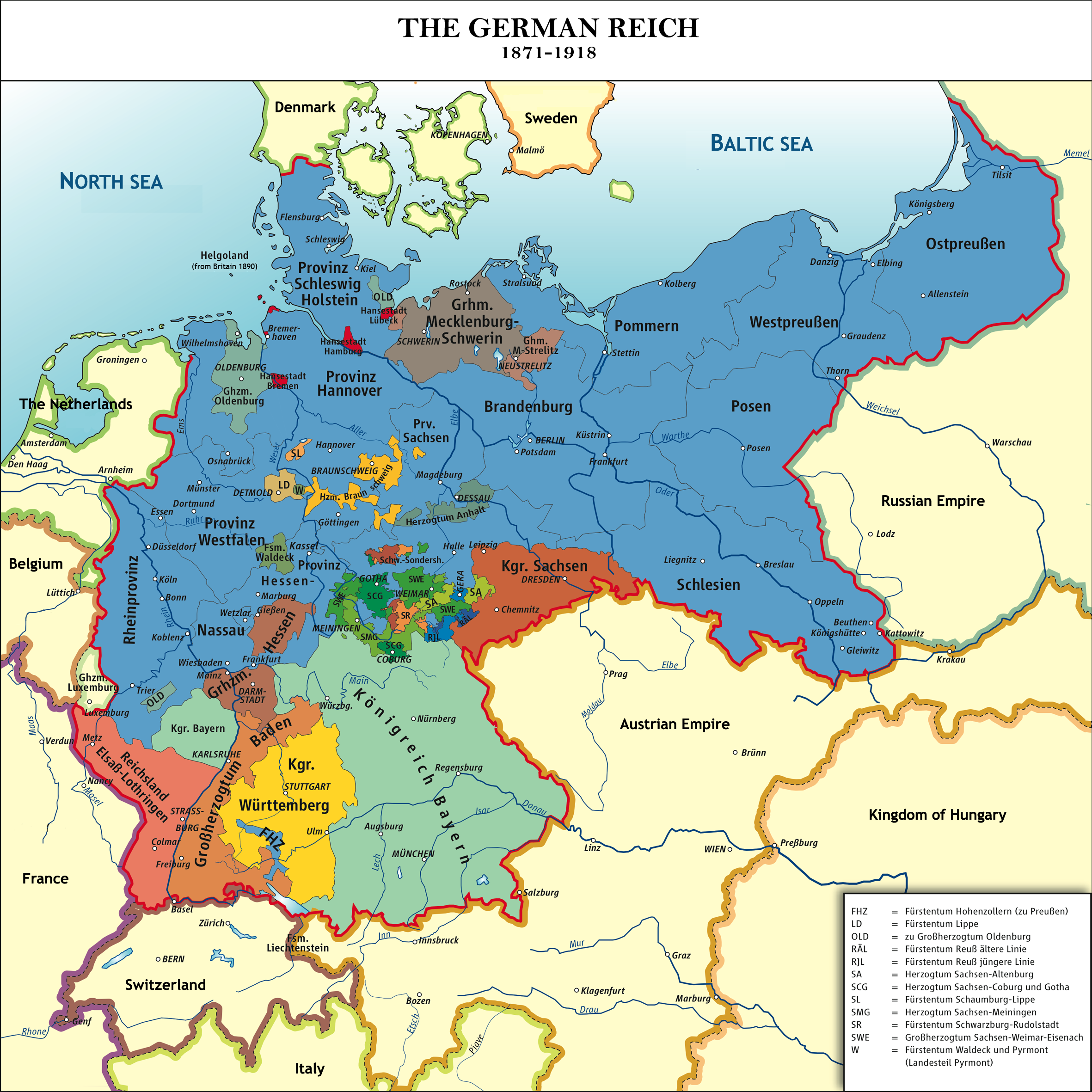
Germany since 1871: In late 1870, the south German states joined the North German Confederation which changed its name to Deutsches Reich. 'Lesser Germany' became a reality.

Austria rejected these attempts and made Prussia give up for the time being its union plans in late 1850. Except for Hungary, the Austrian Empire remained a part of the re-established German Confederation, while Prussia still tried to improve its position within the confederation and even cherished its union plans. Around 1860, the German question became dynamic again. Austria came out weakened by the Italian War of the previous year while Prussia sought to gain the approval of the national movement. Several proposals were made to reform the German Confederation, most notably in 1863 at the Frankfurter Fürstentag. At this moment, the networks of the political elites in Lesser Germany were already quite separate from the Austrian ones.

In April and June 1866, Prussia proposed to convert the German Confederation into a federal state without Austria. Bavaria refused to become Prussia's junior partner in this project. But nevertheless Prussia sought the confrontation with Austria that was unwilling to accept Prussia as its equal within the confederation. The Austro-Prussian War of summer 1866 ended with a Prussian victory and the dissolution of the German Confederation.

Prussia established a federal state in Northern Germany, called the North German Confederation, expanded through addition of the original Prussian nucleus (the East Prussia), as well as annexing into it the predominantly Polish-speaking Prussian-held share of Poland, namely the territories of Province of Posen, West Prussia and the Lauenburg and Bütow Land which were not included in its predecessor, the German Confederation. Although hailed as a German success at the time, the annexations were in fact a Pyrrhic victory, because along with the ensuing Germanisation, the Kulturkampf and the Prussian deportations, they alienated decisively and irrevocably the Polish majority living in these territories from the Hohenzollerns as well as eroded any confidence or loyalty of Poles towards the State of Prussia.

In the peace treaty with Austria, and already before with France, Prussia promised not to expand the North German state to southern Germany. Austria still tried to be a player in the German question. In summer 1870, war broke out between France and the North German Confederation. The south German states were loyal to their military conventions with the North. Austria did not dare to support France because of its weak position after the war of 1866 and because of the German-speaking inhabitants sympathizing with the German cause. Finally, the Austrian government accepted the evolution and the creation of a Lesser Germany in December 1870.
