= Borussian myth =

The Borussian myth or Borussian legend is the name given by early 20th-century historians of German history to the earlier idea that German unification was inevitable, and that it was Prussia's destiny to accomplish it. The Borussian myth is an example of a teleological argument. Borussia is the Latin name for Prussia.

== Teleological arguments ==
A teleological argument holds all things to be designed for, or directed toward, a specific final result. That specific result gives events and actions, even retrospectively, an inherent purpose. When applied to the historical process, an historical teleological argument posits the result as the inevitable trajectory of a specific set of events. These events lead "inevitably," as Karl Marx or Friedrich Engels proposed, to a specific set of conditions or situations; the resolution of those lead to another, and so on. This goal-oriented, 'teleological' notion of the historical process as a whole is present in a variety of arguments about the past: the "inevitability," for example, of the revolution of the proletariat and the "Whiggish" narrative of past as an inevitable progression towards ever greater liberty and enlightenment that culminated in modern forms of liberal democracy and constitutional monarchy.

== Spinning the myth ==
The narrative of the heroic past fell to such nationalist German historians as Heinrich von Treitschke (1834–1896), Theodor Mommsen (1817–1903), and Heinrich von Sybel (1817–1895), to name three. Treitschke in particular viewed Prussia as the logical agent of unification. These historical arguments can also be called the grand, or great, narratives but they are inherently ethnocentric, at least when applied to the historical process. Treitschke's History of Germany in the Nineteenth Century, published in 1879, has perhaps a misleading title: it privileges the history of Prussia over the history of other German states, and it tells the story of the German-speaking peoples through the guise of Prussia's destiny to unite all German states under its leadership. The creation of this myth established Prussia as Germany's savior; it was the destiny of all Germans to be united, this myth maintains, and it was Prussia's destiny to accomplish this. According to this story, Prussia played the dominant role in bringing the German states together as a nation-state; only Prussia could protect German liberties from being crushed by French or Russian influence. This interpretation emphasizes Prussia's role in saving Germans from the resurgence of Napoleon's power in 1814, at Waterloo, creating some semblance of economic unity through the Zollverein (German customs union), and uniting Germans under one proud flag after the defeat of France in the Franco Prussian War in 1871.

== Deconstructing the myth ==
After World War II, various historians of Germany sought to re-examine the German past, in part to understand the immediate German past and the Holocaust, and in part to understand Germany's supposed democratic deficit: Theoretically, Germans were inexperienced with democracy and self-government because their experience in unification came under the leadership of the least democratic of the German states (Prussia). This inevitably led to, first, World War I, and second the failure of the Weimar Republic, third, to the rise of National Socialism, and fourth, to World War II.

The Borussian myth was linked to the Sonderweg theory of Germany's peculiar road to modernity. The set of circumstances that predated the Unification, for example, the so-called failure of the 1848 German revolutions and the elimination of Austria as a possible leader in the unification process strengthen the myth's appeal. In this way, teleological arguments tend to work backward from an event, to describe and rationalize all trends leading to it; they are genealogical—trace from the present to the past—rather than historical, which explores the past to the present.

In the 1970s, and later, as social and cultural historians examined nineteenth-century German history in greater depth, they realized that not only was there a vibrant and lively German culture without Prussia, but they also deconstructed significant elements of the Sonderweg theory as well. They discovered, for example, that the 1848 Revolutions in Germany actually had some significant successes. Indeed, the history of 19th-century Germany was not a long process of grinding under the heel of Prussian militarism, but instead a process of economic expansion, testing of democratic institutions, the writing and testing of constitutions, and the creation of social insurance systems to maintain long term economic security.

== See also ==
- German Empire
- Otto von Bismarck
- History of Prussia

== Sources ==
- Blackbourn, David and Geoff Eley. The Peculiarities of German History: Bourgeois Society and Politics in Nineteenth-Century Germany. Oxford & New York: Oxford University Press, 1984. ISBN 978-0-19-873057-6
- Friedrich, Karin, The Other Prussia: Oyal Prussia, Poland and Liberty, 1569–1772 New York, 2000. ISBN 978-0-521-02775-5
- Kohn, Hans (ed.) German History: Some New German Views. Boston, 1954. ASIN B001037HN4
- Koshar, Rudy, Germany's Transient Pasts: Preservation and the National Memory in the Twentieth Century. Chapel Hill, 1998. ISBN 978-0-8078-4701-5
- Nipperdey, Thomas. Germany from Napoleon to Bismarck, 1800–1866. Princeton, Princeton University Press, 1996. ISBN 978-0-691-02636-7
