= Day of the founding of the German Empire =

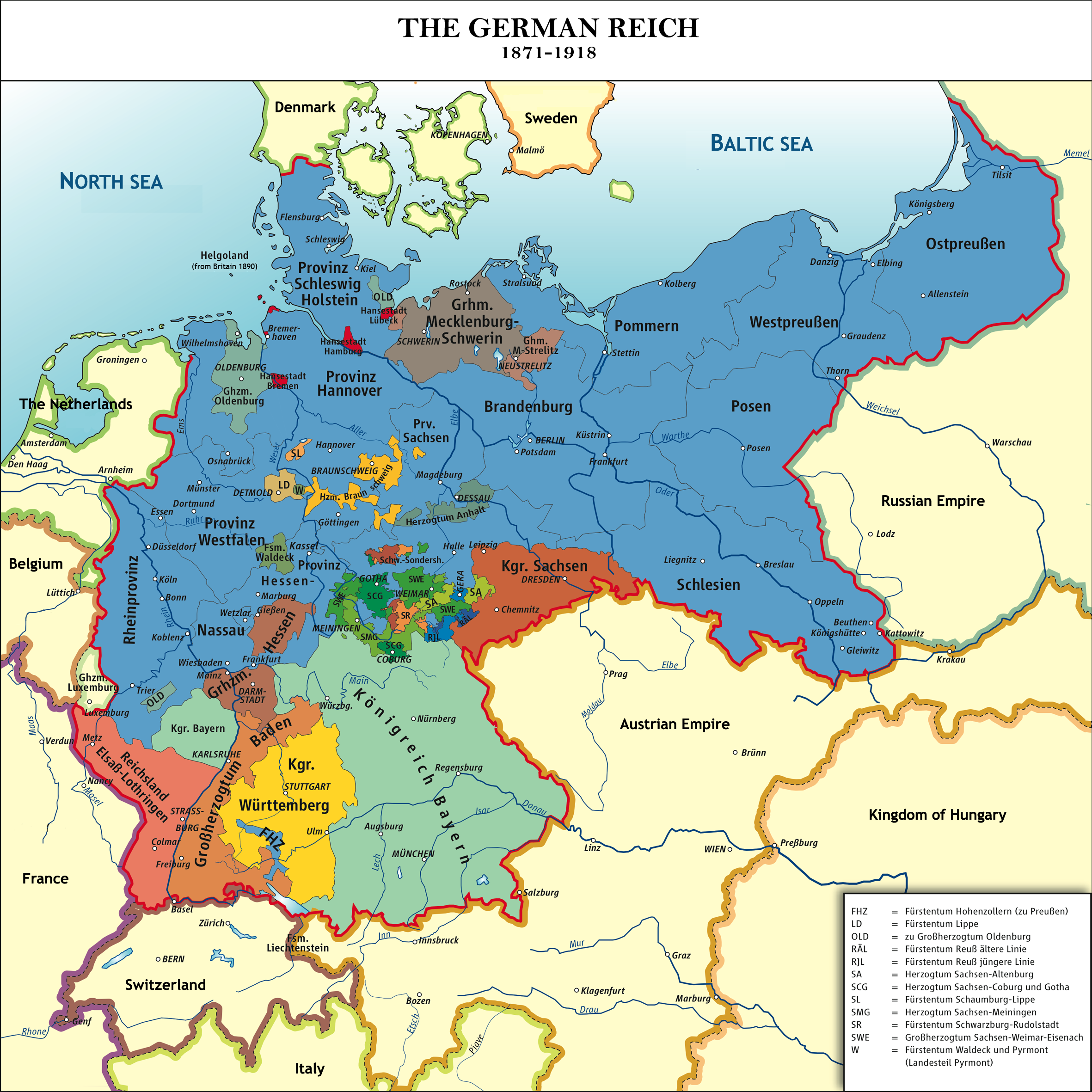
- Map of the German Empire between 1871 and 1918
- Observed by: German Empire
- Date: 18 January
- Next time: 18 January 2026
- Frequency: annual

The Day of the founding of the German Empire (German: Reichsgründungstag, 'Reich Founding Day') was an annual celebration on the anniversary of the proclamation of the German Empire on 18 January 1871 in the Palace of Versailles.

The North German Confederation had already officially adopted the name "German Reich" in its Constitution by 1 January 1871, so constitutionally speaking, 18 January was not the day of the founding.

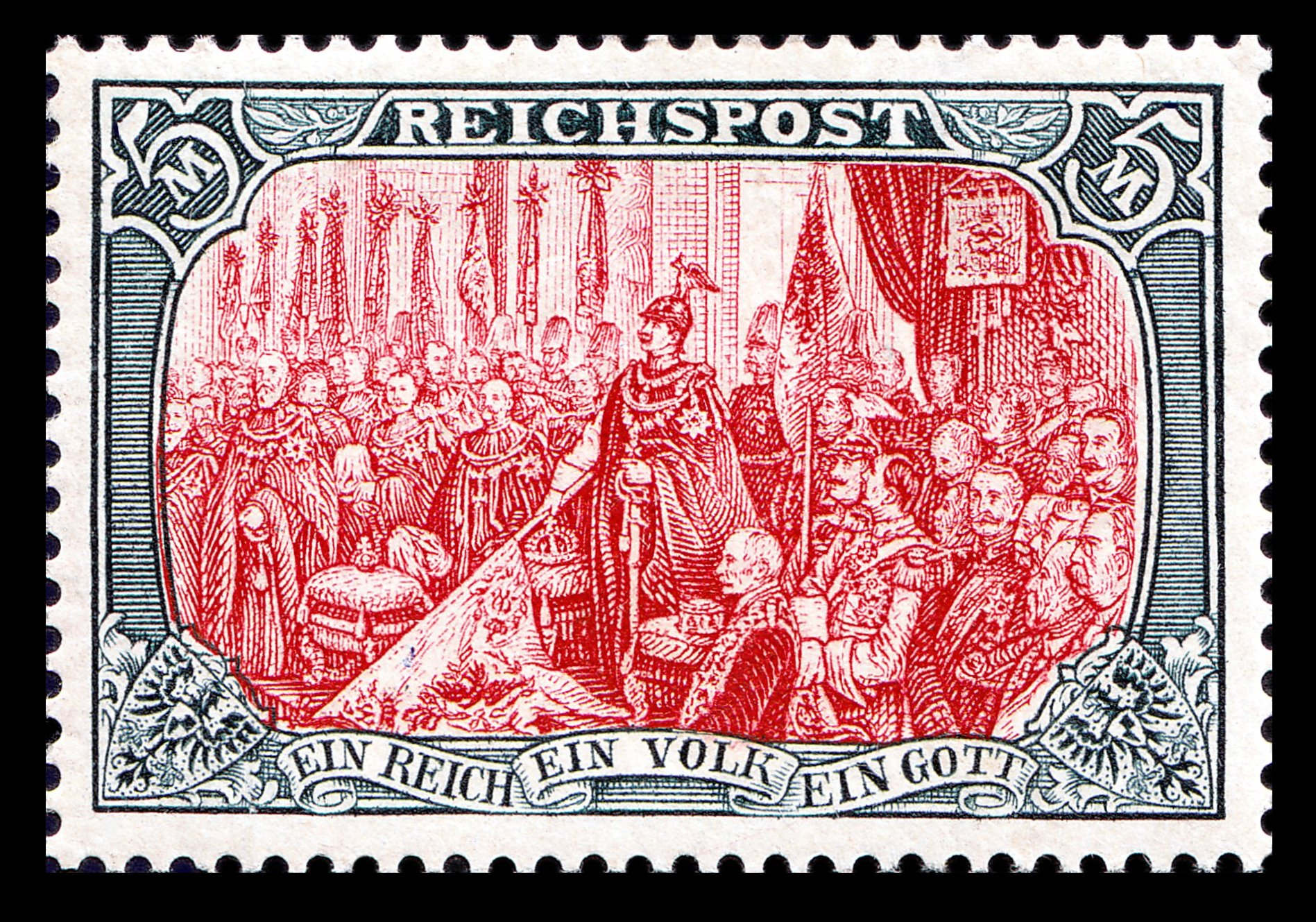
Stampe from 1900 from the "Representations of the German Empire" series. Memorial to the Founding of the German Empire, 1896, in the while hall of the Berlin Castle, based on a painting of William Pape.

== Celebrations ==
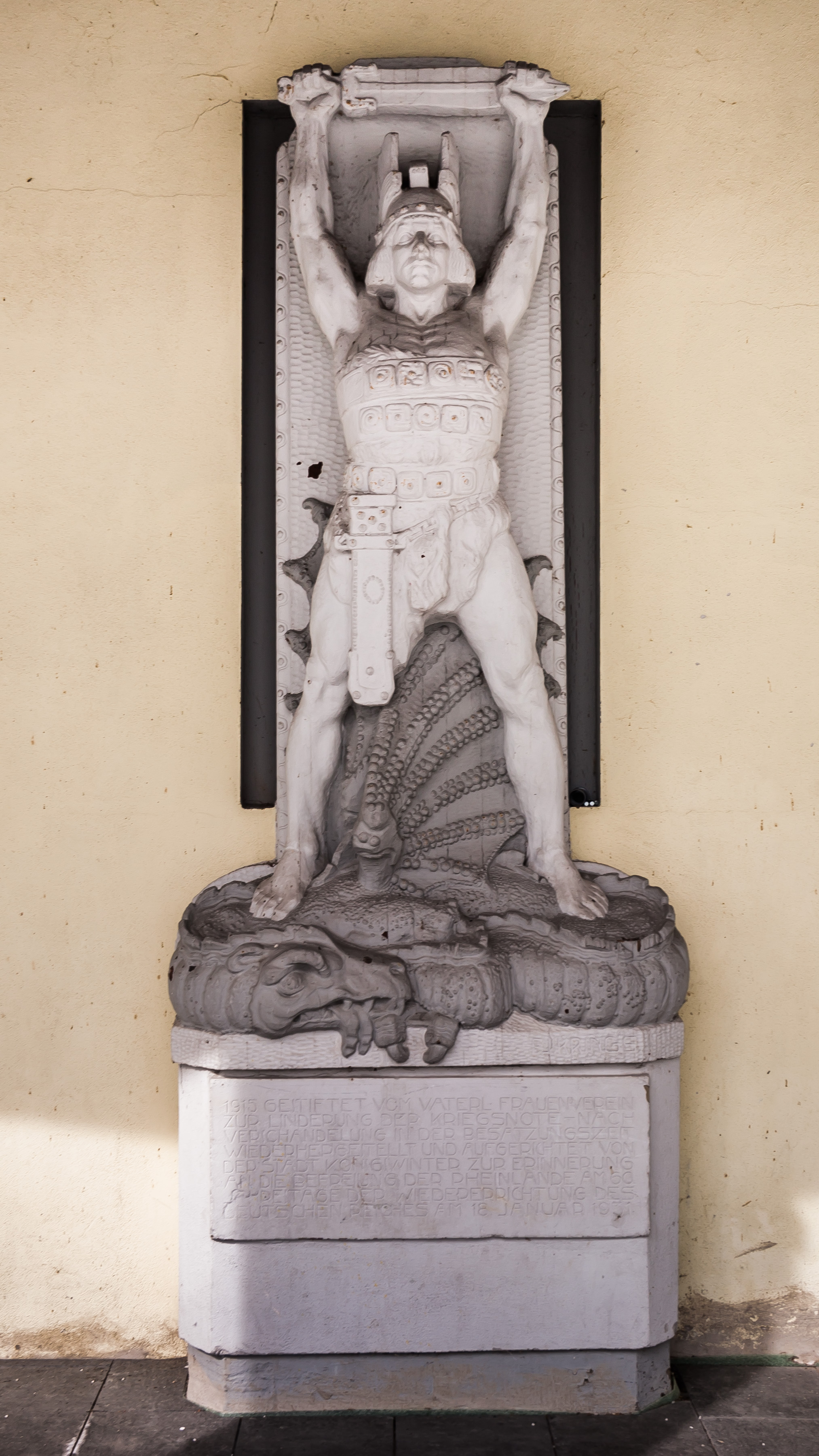
The Siegfried Monument in Königswinter; erected in 1915 and damaged during the occupation of the Rhineland (1918–1930), it was restored and unveiled on Reichsgründungstag 1931.

Celebrations were held annually on 18 January. At centralised and local events, patriotic speeches were held and songs such as Heil dir im Siegerkranz, the unofficial anthem of the empire were sung. Celebrations also took place publicly during the Weimar Republic (1919–1933) and with the participation of high dignitaries. Nazi Germany only celebrated the founding of the German Empire in the beginning.

East Germany completely abolished this custom. On 18 January 1971, West Germany issued a motif of special stamps for the 100th anniversary of the founding of the Empire on 30 Pfennig stamps (Michel catalogue 658 and 385) designed by the Deutsche Bundespost Berlin. This corresponded to the rate for a standard letter at the time. On 24 November 1971, a commemorative coin was struck with a nominal value of five Deutsche Marks which paid tribute to the same event.

Some adherents of the political right continued this tradition. Also, some student connections celebrated Reichsgründungskneipen (Imperial Founding Pubs).

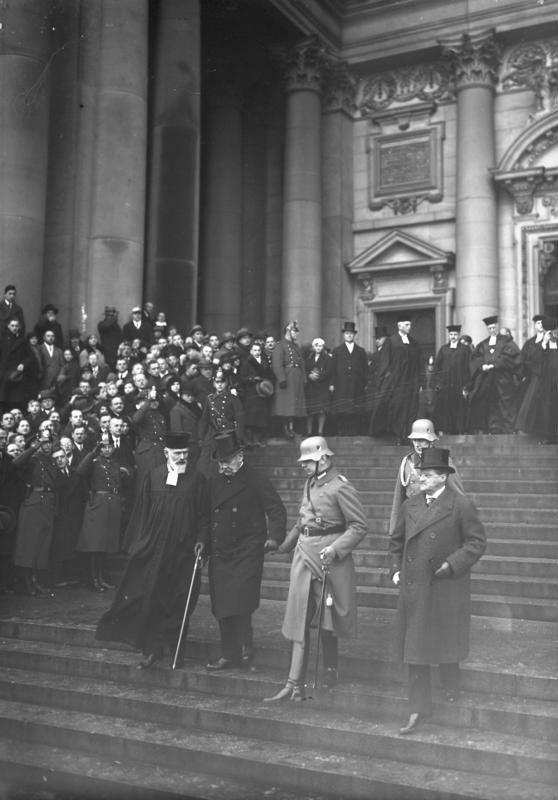
Reichspräsident Paul von Hindenburg leaving the Berlin Cathedral after the celebrations in 1931.

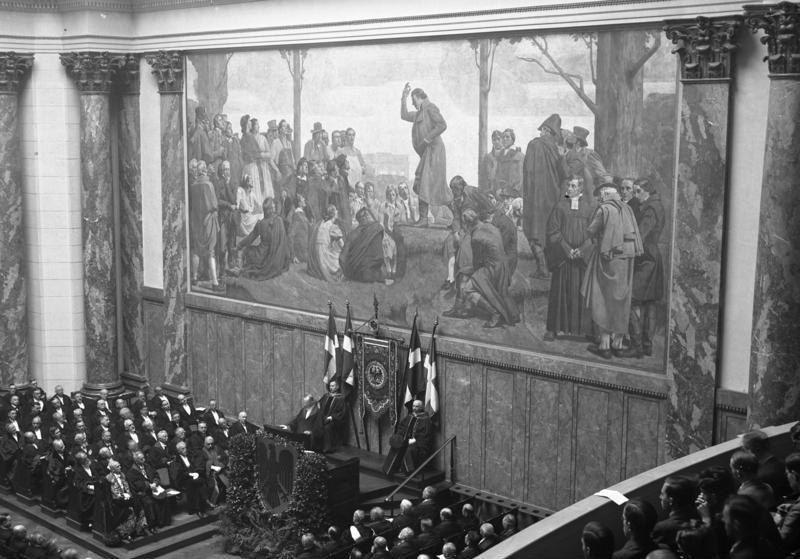
Rudolf Smend speaking in 1933 at the celebrations in the auditorium of Berlin's Humboldt University.

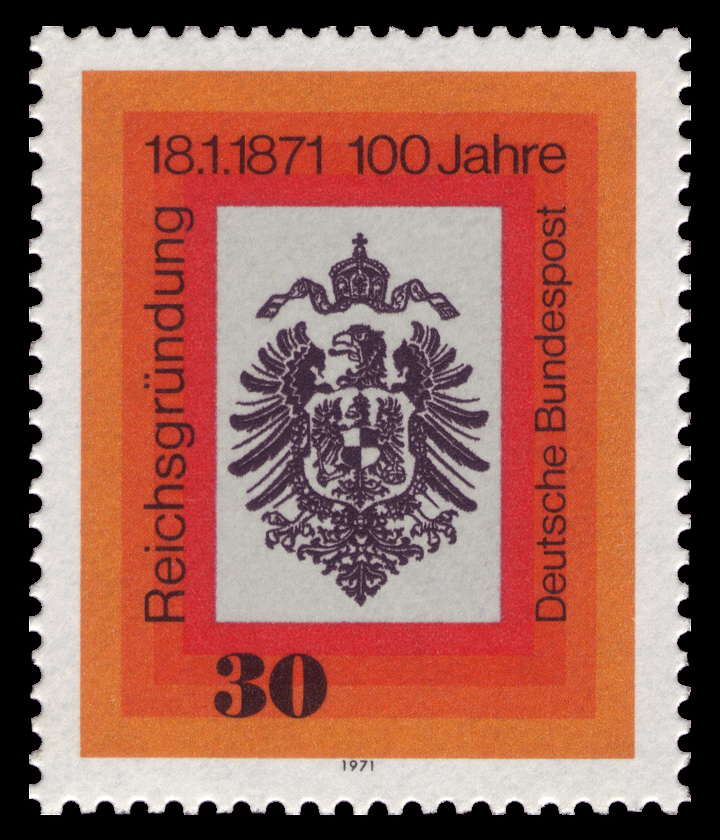
Deutsche Bundespost (1971) issued this stamp on the 100th anniversary of the founding of the Empire - an imperial eagle with the imperial crown.

== See also ==
- Proclamation of the German Empire (paintings)
- Unification of Germany
