= Proclamation of the German Empire =

1871 unification of the German states

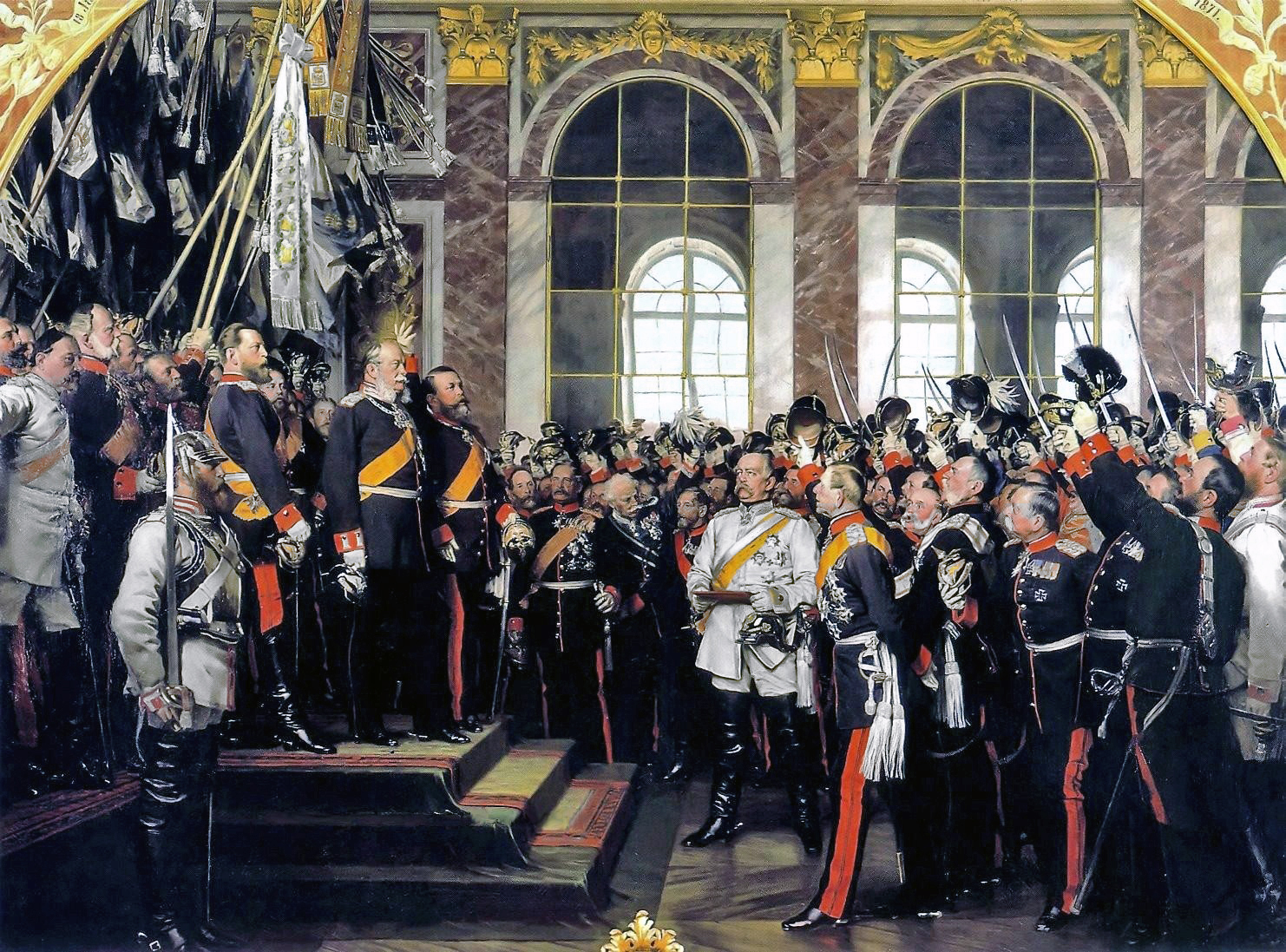
- Third version of Anton von Werner's Proclamation of the German Empire (painted 1885), Bismarck-Museum in Friedrichsruh
- Native name: Ausrufung des Deutschen Reiches
- English name: Proclamation of the German Empire
- Date: 18 January 1871
- Venue: Hall of Mirrors, Palace of Versailles
- Location: Versailles, France; 48°48′19″N 2°08′06″E
- Participants: Otto von Bismarck Wilhelm I of Germany And some others

The proclamation of the German Empire, also known as the Deutsche Reichsgründung, took place on January 18, 1871 after the joint victory of the German states in the Franco-Prussian War. As a result of the November Treaties of 1870, the southern German states of Baden, Hesse-Darmstadt, with their territories south of the Mainlinie, Württemberg and Bavaria, joined the Prussian-dominated "North German Confederation" on 1 January 1871. On the same day, the new Constitution of the German Confederation came into force, thereby significantly extending the federal German lands to the newly created German Empire. The Day of the founding of the German Empire, January 18, became a day of celebration, marking when the Prussian King Wilhelm I was proclaimed German Emperor at the Palace of Versailles, outside Paris, France.

== Imperial proclamation in Versailles ==
=== Background ===
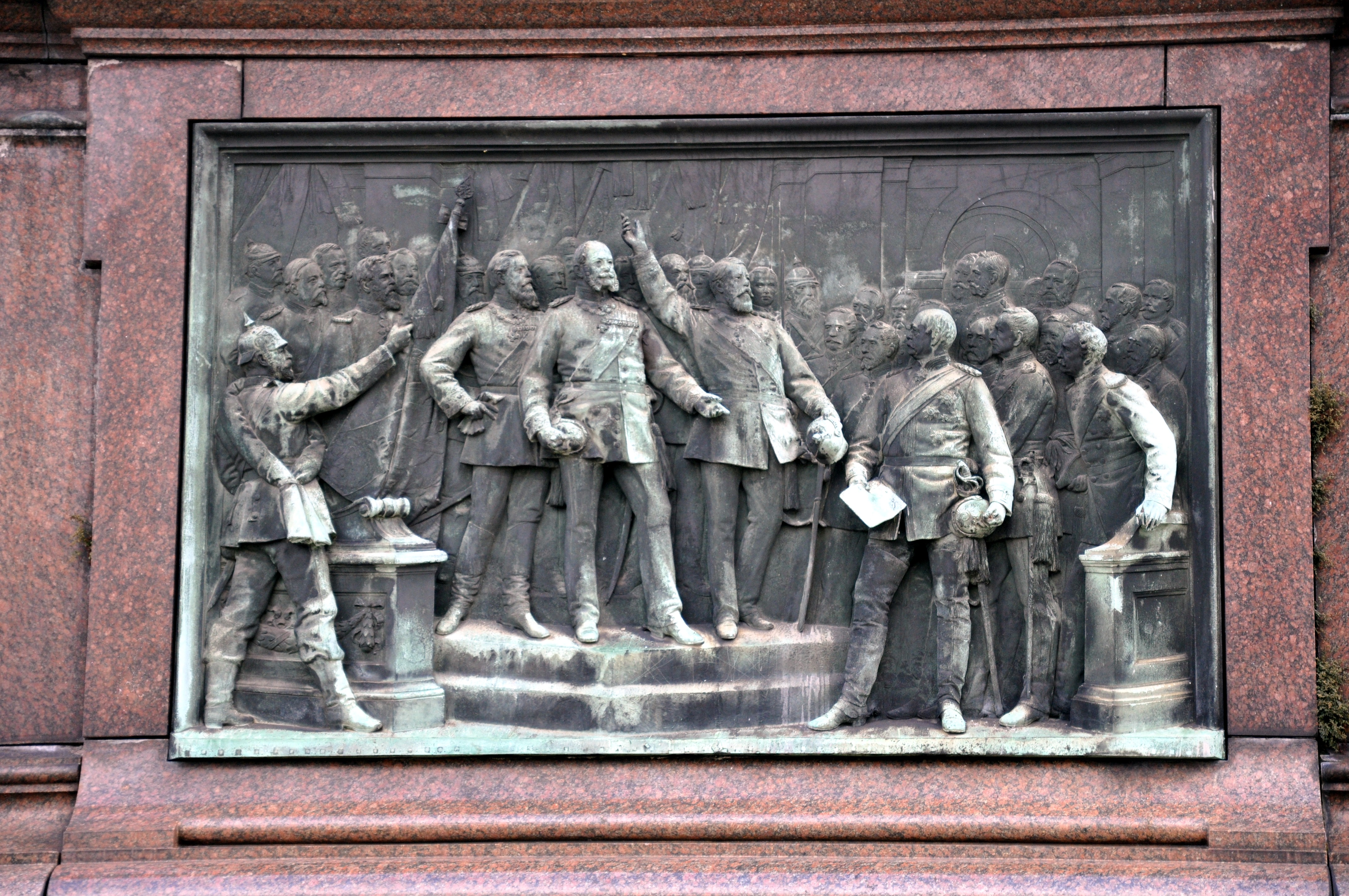
Proclamation of the Emperor in Versailles (Relief on the base of the Kaiser Wilhelm monument from 1897 in Karlsruhe

The German question of whether a united Germany would include or exclude Austria complicated the alliance of German states after the Napoleonic Wars. According to the Prussian minister president Otto von Bismarck, any unification was only possible without Austria, since the Habsburg monarchy was, in fact, economically and militarily tied not only to the other German language states but also to the Slavic states of the Balkan peninsula. The Austro-Prussian War of 1866 led to the dissolution of the German Confederation, founded in 1815, after the Prague Treaty. The result was a system of German alliance under the hegemonic domination of Prussia. After the Prussian victory at the Battle of Königgrätz, and against the wishes of the Habsburgs, Bismarck succeeded in forming the North German Confederation as a military alliance in August 1866 without Austria. A year later, the North German Confederation made a constitution and became a state.

In 1868, Spanish Queen Isabella II was dethroned in a military coup (Glorious Revolution). Prince Leopold of Hohenzollern-Sigmaringen, supported by Prussian Minister-President Bismarck, acted as a candidate for royal succession in Spain. Shortly after his candidature was accepted, however, Leopold of Hohenzollern-Sigmaringen, under the influence of his father, Prince Karl Anton, and the King of Prussia, Wilhelm I, proposed the latter to the throne of Spain because France had threatened war with this candidacy. The Emperor of the French, Napoleon III, however, did not want to be satisfied with the simple withdrawal of the candidacy, and sent his ambassador, Vincent Benedetti, to Bad Ems, to enter negotiations with the King of Prussia. Napoleon demanded an official apology from Prussia and the general renouncement of the Hohenzollern and the Sigmaringen line to the Spanish throne also for the future, which King Wilhelm I did not want to accept. (see: Ems Dispatch) "But one wanted more: the Prussian government had not yet been revealed, the victory did not yet seem perfect. Benedetti was commissioned to demand Wilhelm renounce any claim to the throne, and that he would forbid the Sigmaringen family from accepting the Spanish crown."

The French National Assembly granted funds for war, and on 19 July 1870, the French Empire declared war on the Kingdom of Prussia. The southern German states took the side of Prussia in accordance with their defensive alliances. Victories in August and September 1870, over the French armies led to the willingness of the southern German princes to join the North German Confederation.

On 9 and 10 December 1870, the Reichstag voted to offer the Emperor's title to the Prussian king. In addition, the country was to be renamed "German Reich". This became effective on 1 January 1871 with a new constitution. As a day for the imperial proclamation to take place, 18 January was chosen, to coincide with the royal coronation of Elector Frederick III of Brandenburg's coronation as Frederick I of Prussia in 1701, founding the Kingdom of Prussia. The 1871 event took place in the Hall of Mirrors at the Palace of Versailles, the ceiling on which was celebrated by Louis XIV, the Sun King, as a conqueror of German cities and states. At the time of the imperial proclamation, the French capital Paris was besieged by coalition troops. The seat of the great headquarters of the German armies was Versailles. The Prussian leadership and - at least in part - the leaders of the allies were gathered around Paris.

=== Proclamation on 18 January 1871 ===
On 18 January 1871, German troops paraded behind military bands around the Palace of Versailles. The delegations of the German field-regiments were crowded in the Hall of Mirrors. They raised their battle-torn banners in a "colourful forest". In the middle of the hall stood an altar, where participants celebrated a worship service, at the end of which all those present were singing the song Nun danket alle Gott (Now thank we all our God). At the end of the gallery was an elevated podium, on which Wilhelm I and the various princes stood. Otto von Bismarck read out the proclamation. Thereupon, Frederick I, Grand Duke of Baden, Wilhelm I's only son-in-law shouted "His Majesty, Kaiser Wilhelm", and the other attendants repeated three times. The ceremony ended, although the hurrahs continued outside from the deployed troops. The expression "Kaiser Wilhelm" avoided the precise, constitutional title "German Emperor", which Wilhelm would not accept.

The rulers of the Grand Duchy of Hesse, the Duchy of Brunswick and the Principalities of Reuss (Younger and Older Line), Schwarzburg-Sondershausen, Waldeck-Pyrmont, Lippe were not represented at the imperial proclamation in Versailles.

== Accounts from eyewitnesses ==
The ceremony has been detailed in numerous accounts from the time, and the most important people and their function were described in detail. To conceal the subliminal controversies by mythical concepts, it was said, for example, that the crown had been "cowed by the flood of all German tribes". The founding of the German Empire took place in a contradictory mixture of modesty and grandeur.

The letter of the new Emperor Wilhelm I, future Chancellor Otto von Bismarck, who served as the driver of the founding of the German Empire, and the public account made by historian Albert von Pfister, who was present as a soldier, agreed to the fact that a field altar, instead of a throne, would be built on the Hall of Mirrors. While Wilhelm I emphasised the religious nature of the ceremony, Bismarck encountered the political content of the ceremony because he was said to have preferred an actual mood of religious retreat to the pose to victory. Bismarck, surprisingly, openly criticised the emperor's behaviour since the emperor did not view himself as holding authority over the princes but saw himself as a master of war who triumphed with his faithfuls. Wilhelm spontaneously brought the princes to the same level. In Pfister's description, the religious focus of the ceremony which Wilhelm and Bismarck emphasised. He emphasised, on the other hand, the polarising public effect. The three reports appear more authentically than later portrayals, especially the portrayals in source edits and school book presentations between 1918 and 1945, all of which were created under the dominating impression of the shocking defeat of the "Bismarck Empire" during the First World War.

== See also ==
- November Treaties, which brought the south German states into the German Empire
- Kaiserbrief
- Titles and Emblems of the German Emperor after 1873
- Proclamation of the republic in Germany
- Foundation of East Germany
