= Gelnhausen Charter =

The Gelnhausen Charter was a charter written by the Holy Roman Emperor Frederick I deposing Duke Henry XII for committing treason and "gravely oppressing … the nobles … [by] occupying their possessions and diminishing their rights." It split the duchies of Westphalia and Angria away from the Duchy of Saxony.

== Background ==
Henry XII was previously supporting the emperor's campaigns in Italy, however he stopped supporting as much. When the emperor asked Henry to help with his campaign against the Lombard League, he asked for the city of Goslar, which was an important city with many silver mines. The emperor refused. Henry was charged with treason in 1181 and was stripped of his titles.

== Effects ==
After Henry was stripped of his titles he started a war against the Holy Roman Empire. He found initial success, however due to poor management of his vassals and foreign policy, he lost. Saxony was split into Angria, which was granted to one of Albert of Brandenburg's sons, and Westphalia, which was given to the Sigwin the Pious, Archbishop of Cologne. The Gelnhausen Charter forced Henry to go into exile, and he fled to Henry II of England's court. He briefly attempted to get his lands back, however he failed and made peace with Henry VI.
