= Angria =

European historical region

Coordinates: 52°11′N 9°6′E

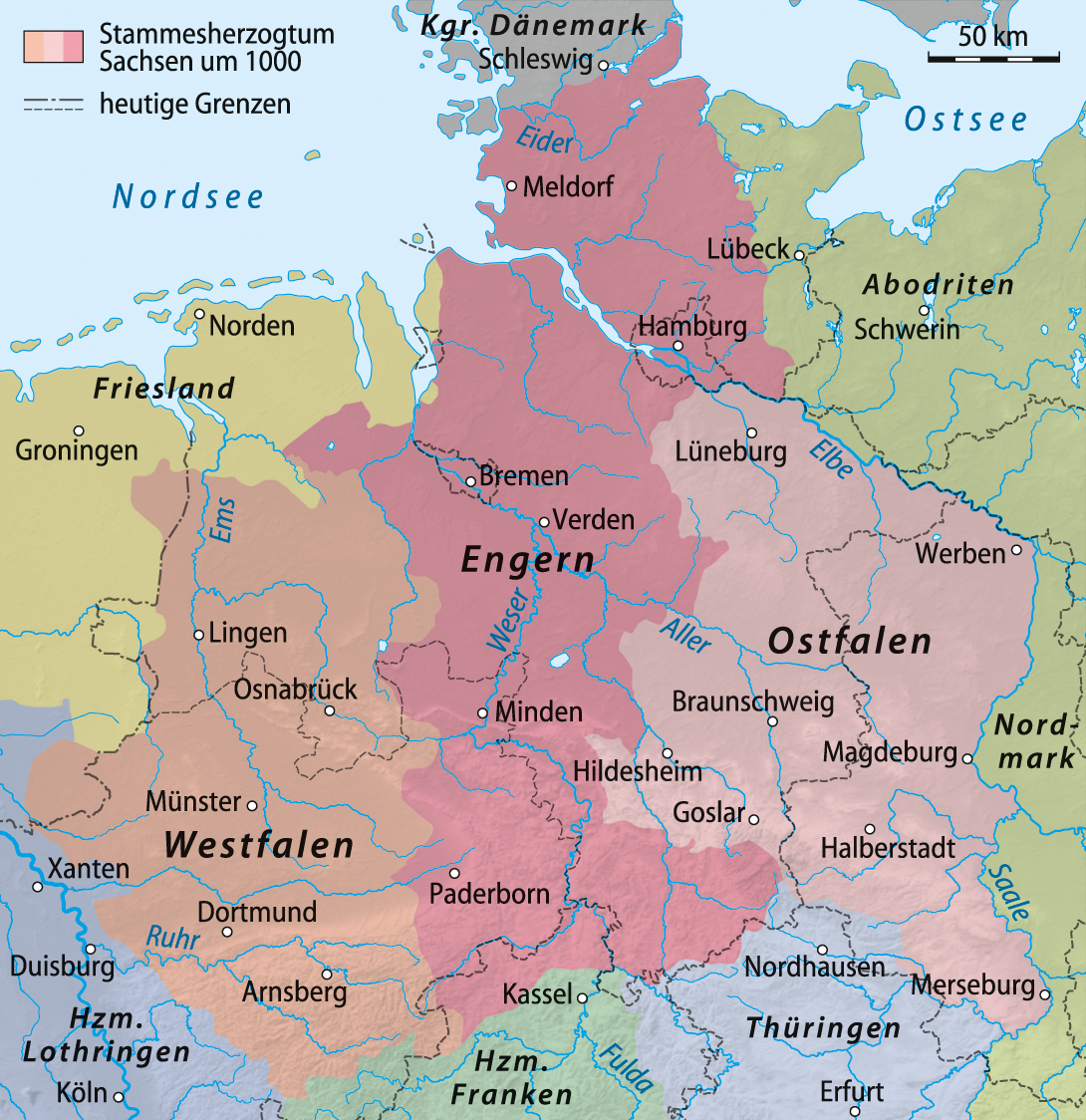
Angria (German: Engern) within the Stem Duchy of Saxony in the 10 century

Angria or Angaria (German: Engern [ˈɛŋɐn]) is a historical region in the present-day German states of Lower Saxony and North Rhine-Westphalia. The chronicler Widukind of Corvey in his Res gestae saxonicae sive annalium libri tres denoted it as one of three core regions of the Old Saxony, lying along the middle reaches of the Weser river between two other core regions, Westphalia and Eastphalia, and thus encompassing central parts of the medieval Stem Duchy of Saxony.

Historical coat of arms of Angria

Its name was derived from the Germanic Angrivarii (Latin: Angarii) tribe which had joined the Saxon tribal confederation, and it was centered on the town of Minden, see of a bishopric since 803. The Angrivarii lands were conquered by Charlemagne during the Saxon Wars; according to the Royal Frankish Annals, the Angrian commanders concluded a separate peace agreement with the Carolingian Empire near Bückeburg in 775.

In 1180, the Emperor Frederick I deposed the duke of Saxony, Henry the Lion, and divided the duchy into two parts through the so-called Gelnhausen Charter. The Duchy of Westphalia was granted to the Archbishopric of Cologne, while Angria was given to Bernhard of Anhalt, who used the Saxon ducal title. The name Angria thereafter became obsolete. In the 13th century, the central area on the Weser became the nucleus of the County of Hoya, which in 1582 was inherited by the House of Brunswick-Lüneburg.

Upon the expansion of the Kingdom of Prussia towards the old Saxon regions (initially in 1815, and again in 1866), the title Duke of Angria (German: Herzog von Engern) was revived and included into the extended Prussian royal titles, and later (1871) into the extended titles of German Emperors from the House of Hohenzollern.

== See also ==
- Enger

== Sources ==
- Bachrach, Bernard S.; Bachrach, David S., eds. (2014). Widukind of Corvey: Deeds of the Saxons. Washington: The Catholic University of America Press.
- Rotter, Ekkehart; Schneidmüller, Bernd, eds. (1981). Widukind von Corvey: Res gestae Saxonicae: Die Sachsengeschichte. Stuttgart: Reclam.
