= Proclamation of the German Empire (paintings) =

Paintings by Anton von Werner, 1877-1913

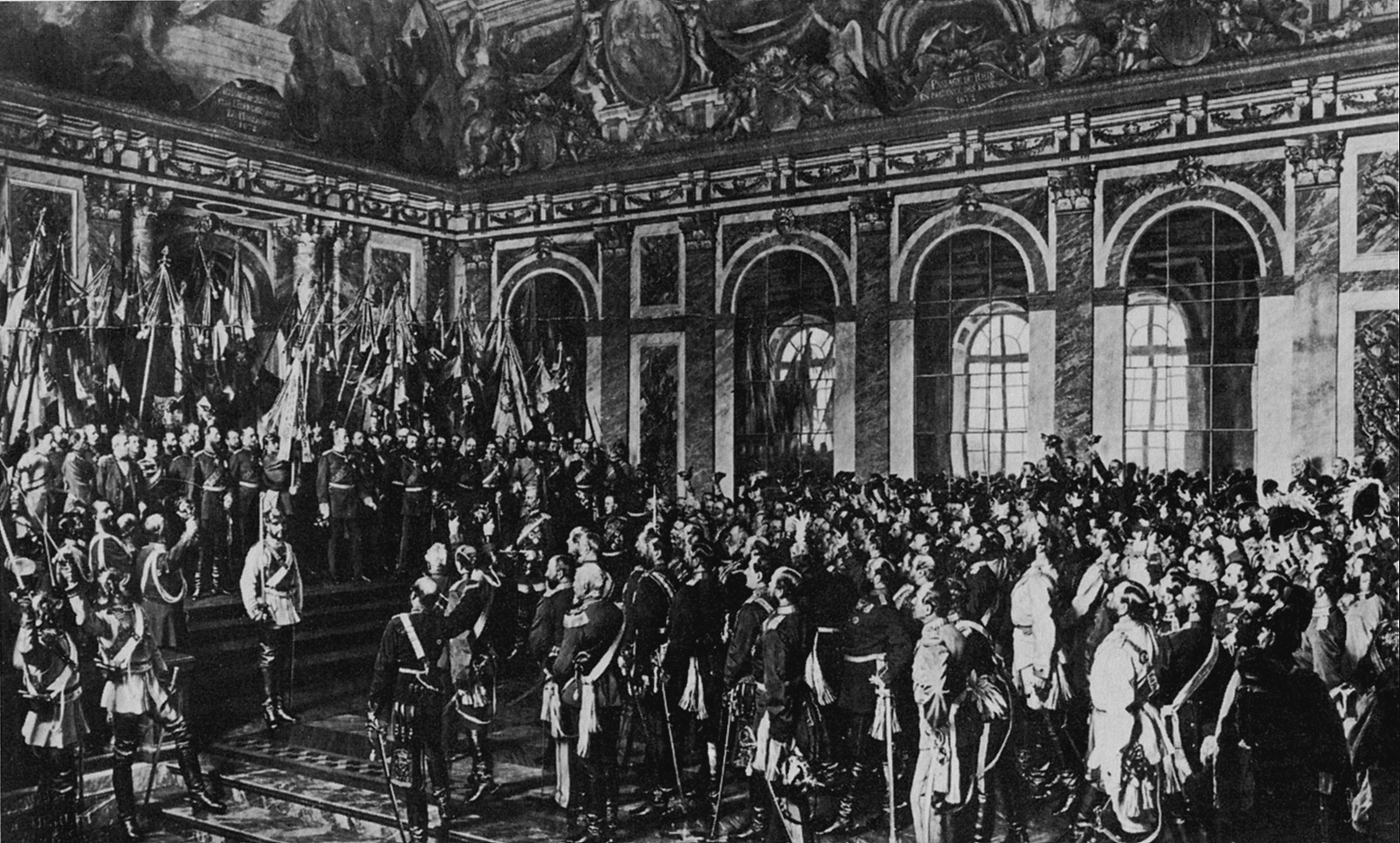
Painting for the Berlin Palace, unveiled on 22 March 1877. Oil on canvas, 4.34 x 7.32m, lost during World War II. It survives as a black-and-white photograph, shortened by about 40cm on the right edge

The Proclamation of the German Empire (18 January 1871) is the title of several historical paintings by the German painter Anton von Werner.

On 18 January 1871, Anton von Werner was present at the proclamation of the German Empire at the Palace of Versailles in his capacity as a painter. In the following years, he produced several versions of the imperial proclamation at greater intervals, two of which were shown in prominent places in Berlin. Only a third version was preserved to Otto von Bismarck's last residence, Friedrichsruh, and is now open to the public. It is the most reproduced picture of the Imperial Proclamation.

Since the three paintings show strong differences, the images are of great documentary and historical dichotomy. Von Werner obviously adapted them to the wishes of his respective clients. The clothes worn by Bismarck in the first painting do not match with the other two paintings. Bismarck is wearing his white parade uniform in the second and third painting, which places him in the focus of the viewer. In fact, in Versailles, he was wearing a blue gun coat. In addition, he was holding the Order of Pour le Mérite on his white uniform, which he received in 1884. Minister of War Albrecht von Roon, who did not participate in the proclamation of Versailles, was also included in the third version. In the first, second, and third paintings, the Grand Duke of Baden summons the new emperor. The perspective makes it appear that the imperial proclamation was above all a work of the princes and of the military.

Von Werner began working on the picture as one of the most active and influential German artists.

== First painting, 1877 ==
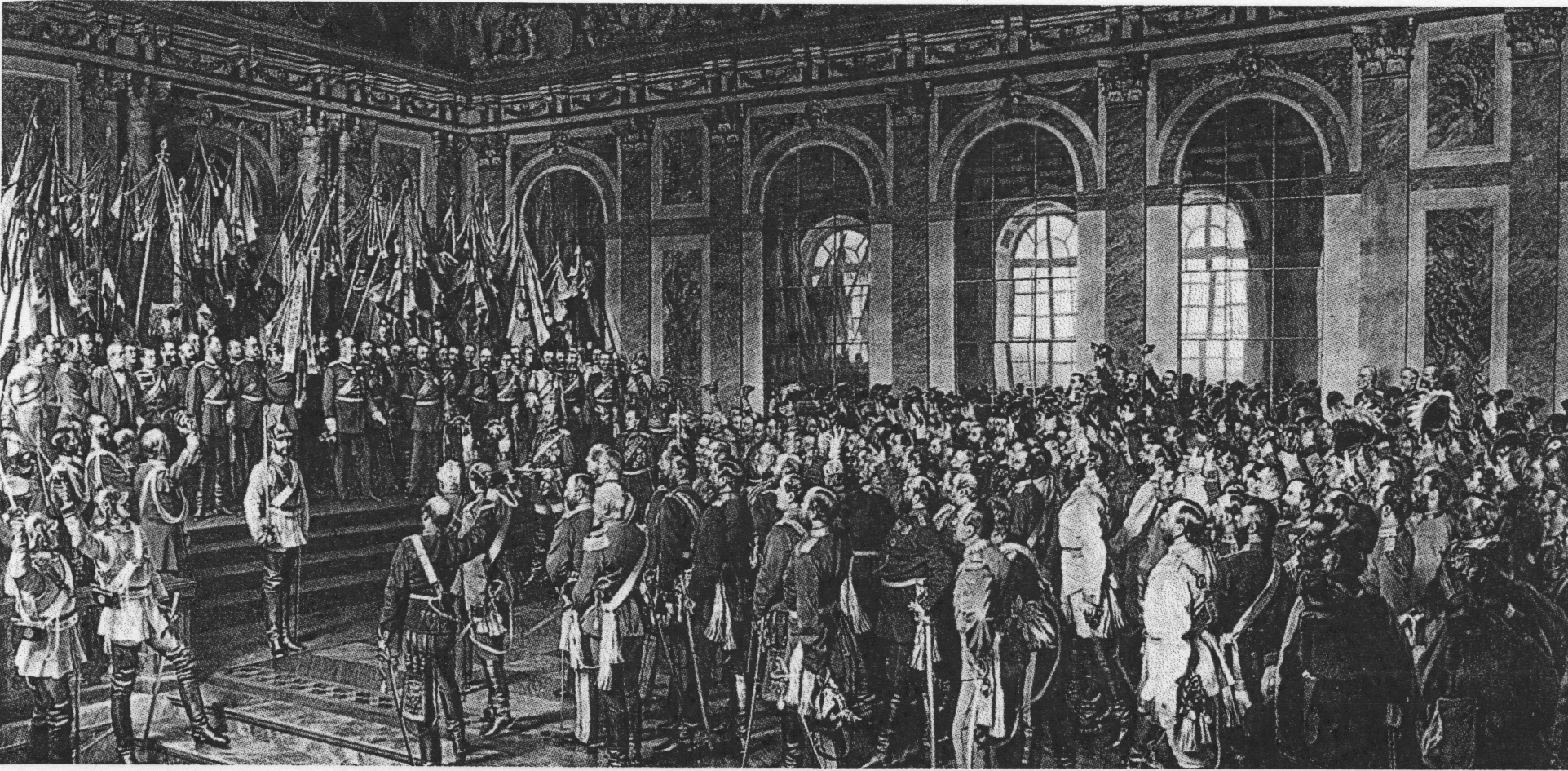
On this reproduction of the painting, Werner's self-portrait can be seen on the extreme right margin (with a mustache).

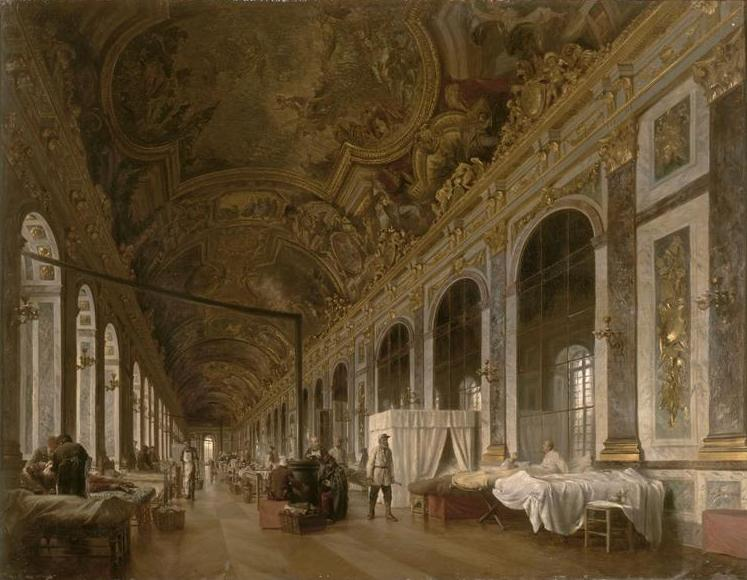
The Hall of Mirrors in the Palace of Versailles. A few days after the imperial proclamation, the victors of the Siege of Paris used it as a hospital (contemporary painting).

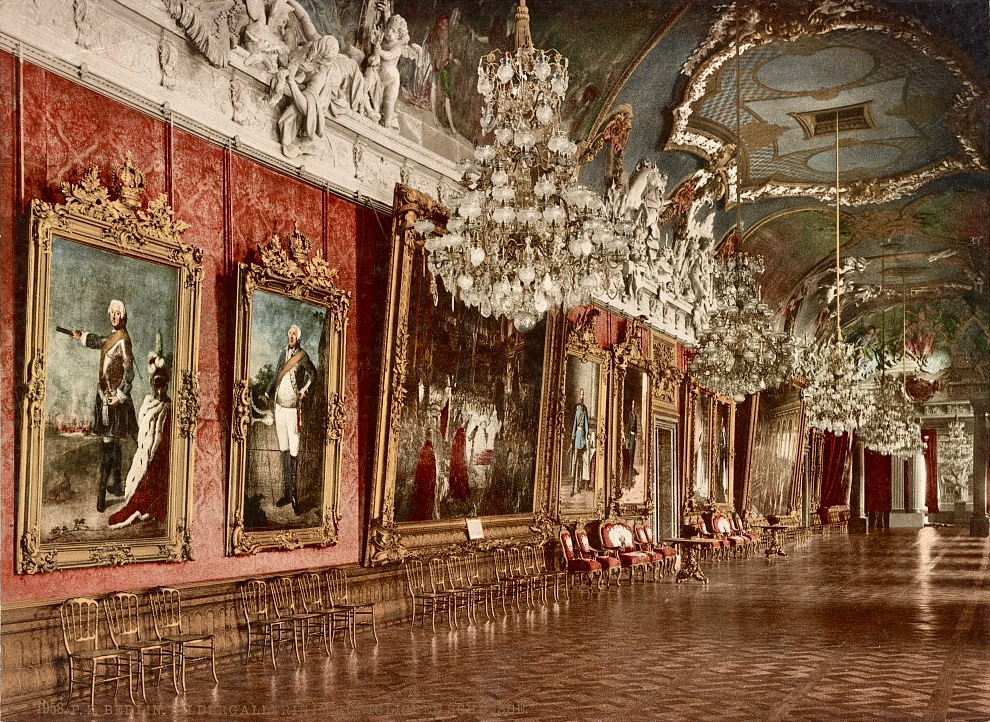
Picture gallery in Berlin Palace around 1900. In the foreground, Adolph von Menzel's large painting of the coronation of Wilhelm I; further back, Werner's even larger painting.

In 1870, von Werner spent the final phase of the Franco-Prussian War at the headquarters of the Third Army led by Prussian crown prince Frederick William. In January 1871, the latter asked him to travel from Karlsruhe to the "Grand Headquarter" in the Palace of Versailles to "experience something worthy of your brush." Von Werner was only informed of the Proclamation of the German Empire on 18 January. The crown prince had impressed the design of the Palace of Versailles, which presented itself to visitors as a national site of fame in France, furnished with historical paintings. He wanted something similar for Berlin, but, unlike Napoleon, he had not come to the idea that the imminent ceremony would be designed by the painter for posterity. Napoleon had allowed Jacques-Louis David to stage the furnishing and the appearance of the actors in his imperial crown for a historical painting.

The Prussian ceremony in the Hall of Mirrors was short and simple. In the elongated gallery stood, on the window side, Prussian and Bavarian soldiers and on the mirror side, their officers, mixed with some other southern German armies. The King, accompanied by German princes and his entourage, crossed the trellis to the middle, where a field altar was erected. There, a Potsdam army chaplain celebrated a worship service, during which the chorus sang "Nun danken alle Gott" (Now Thank We All Our God). Then, the group went to a flat platform at the end of the gallery, where the princes and William stood in the middle. Bismarck, who stood below surrounded by commanders, read the imperial proclamation. Thereupon, the Grand Duke of Baden issued a "Hoch" ("Hurrah") to "His Majesty Emperor William", which those who were in attendance repeated three times. The ceremony was over, while the calls continued among the troops stationed in the palace and the park.

During the worship, Werner quickly sketched the main characters in the immediate vicinity of the Emperor. He later portrayed the princes, the representatives of the Hanseatic cities and numerous officers. During the work, an almost friendly relationship with the Crown Prince came about, as well as the personal relations to Federal Chancellor Bismarck and Emperor William.

Werner had the problem of representing the trellis that formed the soldiers with the officers to the gallery and the princes grouped around them. The adjoining oil painting by Victor Bachereau-Reverchon (1842-1885) shows the comparatively narrow space, from whose end the flat gallery for the Emperor had already been removed. It was also important to take the picture of the ceiling paintings that glorify Louis XIV as a conqueror of German lands and cities. As early as January 1871, a conceptual design followed, and later a model, which was approved by the Crown Prince.

The picture was commissioned for the Berlin Palace. Werner determined the image format according to a place he had chosen in the "White Hall", the largest of the château, which was used for public events such as the opening of the Reichstag and the grand court. His visit was the end and highlight of the guided tours through the representative rooms of the castle, where several hundred paying visitors took part every day. The picture was against the window wall, opening the view to Unter den Linden. When Wilhelm II had the hall redesigned in 1892, the picture only fitted into a 9.5 x 9.7m gap at the western end of the picture gallery, thus losing its effect. After the transformation of the picture gallery into a tapestry gallery by William II in 1914 and the following years of the Weimar Republic and the period of National Socialism, the painting remained like most "parental pictures" of the castle, the eyes of the visitors. Werner's headquarters at the castle were burned during World War II on 2 February 1945, during an air raid on Berlin.

== Second painting, 1882 ==
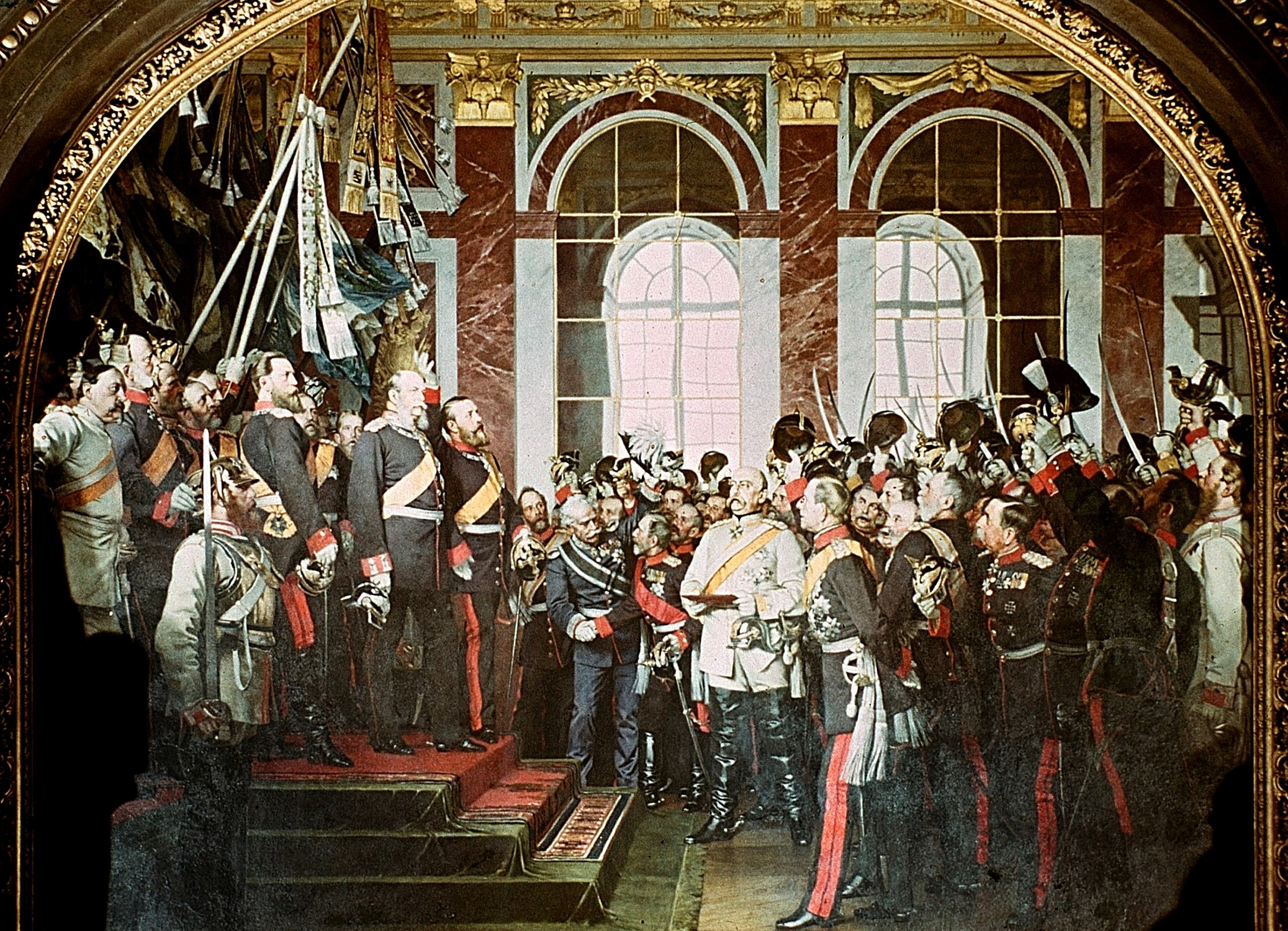
Painting for the Hall of Fame in Berlin's Zeughaus, 1883, wall painting, wax paints on canvas, 5.0 x 6.0m, lost in the war

The great popularity of the painting prompted William I to entrust Werner with the production of the imperial proclamation in the newly erected Hall of Fame of the Prussian Army in Berlin's Zeughaus. There, opposite to the entrance of the Ruler's Hall, two wall paintings of Werner's flanked the figure of the victorious goddess Viktoria von Fritz Schaper. To the left was the coronation of Frederick III as Prussian King in 1701, and on the right was the proclamation of William I as German Emperor in 1871. The dome, painted by Friedrich Geselschap, arched above.

Werner designed a frontal display showing William on a high platform surrounded by German princes. At the lowest level, Bismarck, whom Werner had emphasised for colour composition with white uniforms, turned to him, Roon, Moltke and other German commanders. In the foreground, cheering officers to the right of the picture could be seen and to the left a larger group of simple soldiers. In the meantime, two allegorical figures held the Emperor's coat of arms. William rejected Werner's design as being unrealistic, especially since Roon had not taken part in the ceremony. He agreed, however, with Bismarck's uniform, which was also inaccurate. "You are right, he was wrongly dressed."

Because of the smaller width of the picture, Werner had to reduce the size of the painting considerably. Only the princes of seven larger states remained to the figures of William I, the Crown Prince, and the Grand Duke of Baden. Werner even further reduced the group of officers, placing Georg von Kameke, who had now been appointed Minister of War, in the foreground while others came to the rear. The Prussian Army, with Bavaria, were now documented by a hand of the Prussian General Leonhard von Blumenthal with his Bavarian comrade Jakob von Hartmann, emphasised by his high head of hair and light blue uniform.

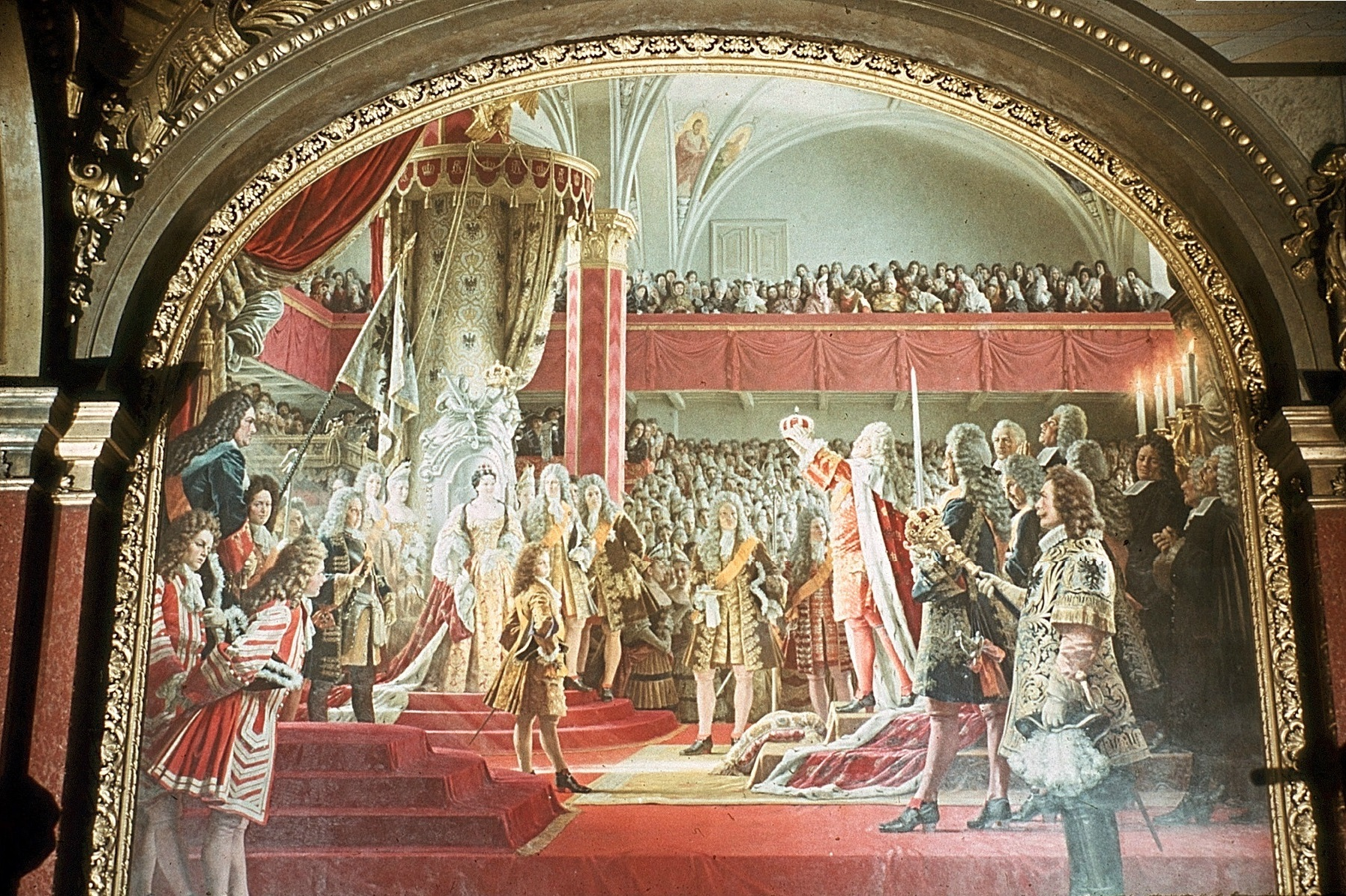
“The Coronation of Frederick I as King of Prussia” (1887) was the counterpart to the proclamation in the Hall of Fame in Berlin's Zeughaus

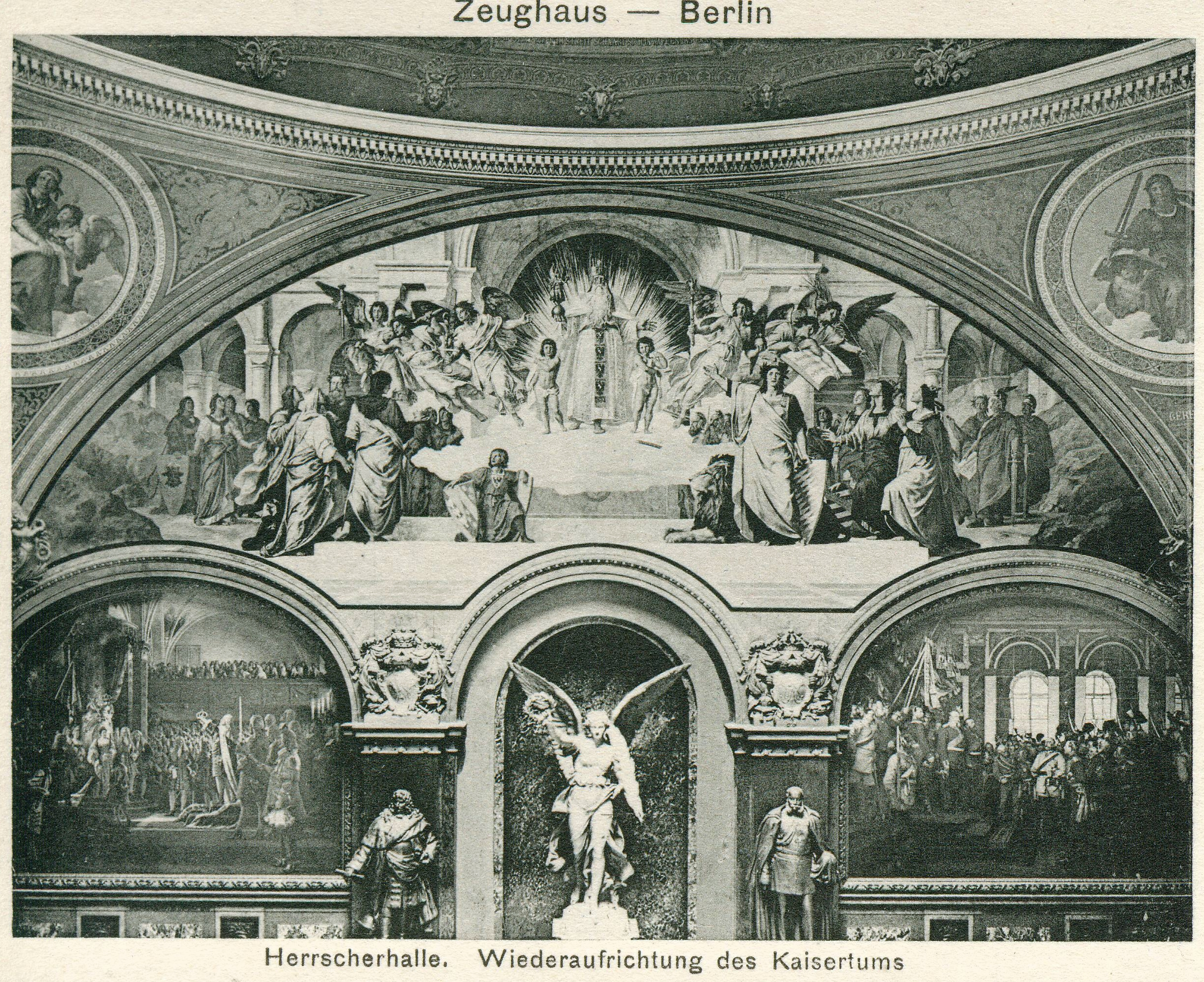
Geselschap's "Raising of the Emperor" in the dome, including the Viktoria and Werner's murals

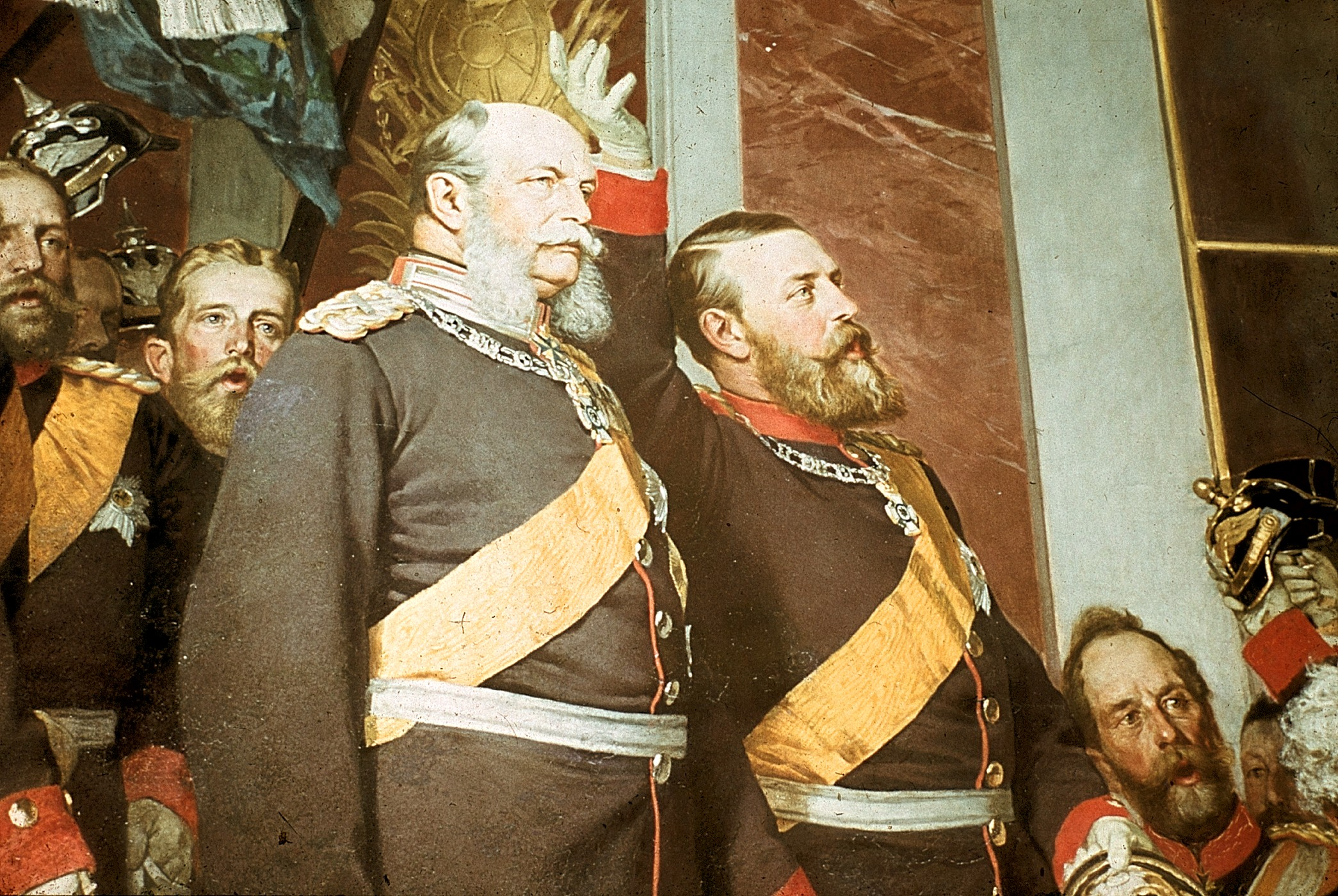
Detail. William and his son-in-law, Grand Duke Frederick I of Baden (right)

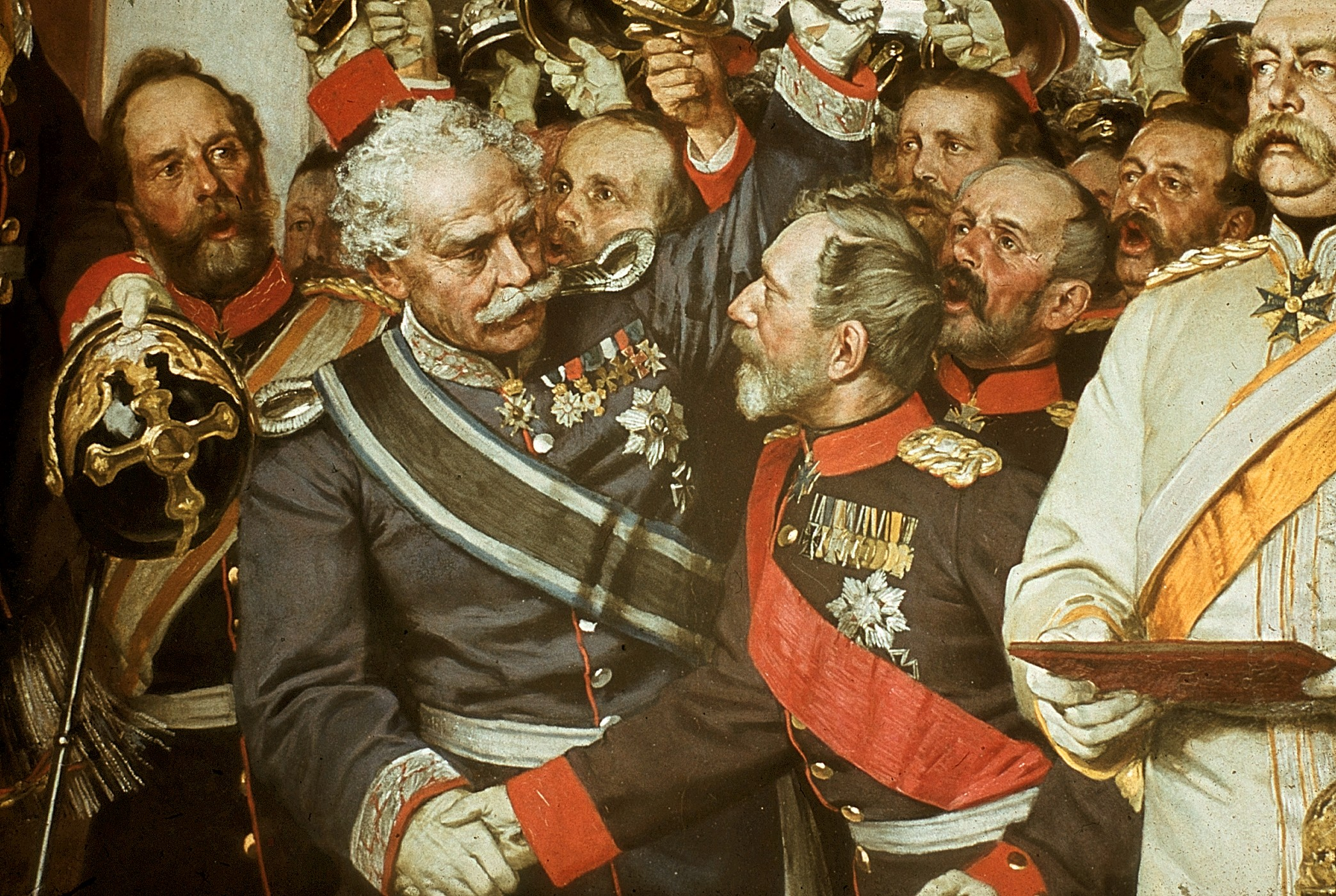
Detail, among others, with Jakob von Hartmann and Bismarck

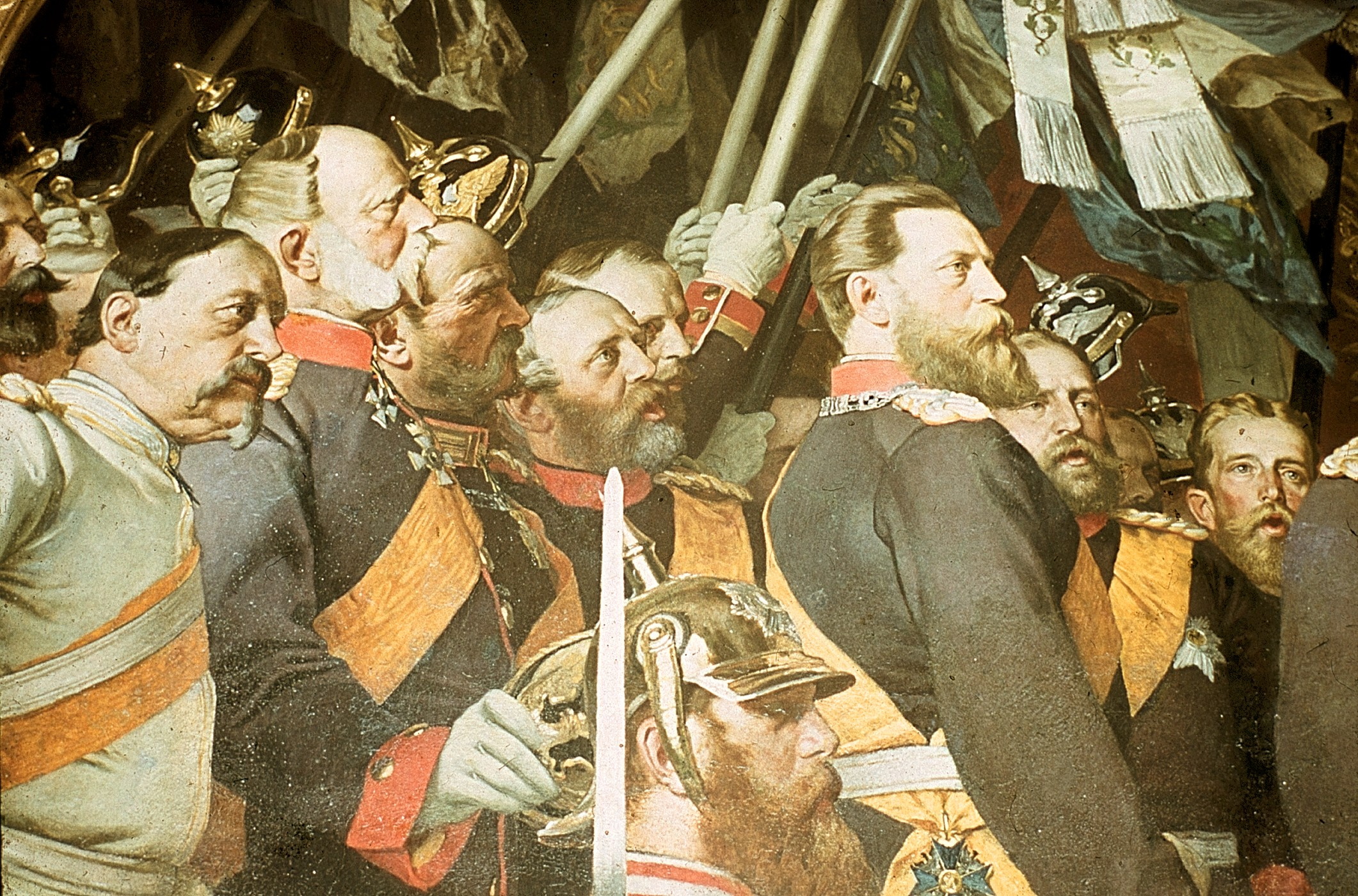
Detail, among others with Crown Prince Frederick III and Duke Ernest II of Saxe-Coburg and Gotha (far left)

In the reception of the second painting, it was often problematic that some features such as the now white uniform of Bismarck and his decoration of the Pour le Mérite do not correspond to the actual historical situation of 1871. Werner, however, deliberately portrayed the participants in the imperial proclamation according to the real circumstances of 1882, and thus a decade after the founding of the Empire. The figures were aged by a good ten years and had gained in importance at the same time. The emperor was now more than just a primus inter pares, and Bismarck had received the Order. Thomas W. Gaehtgens thus assigned to this image the function that "it is not a description of history, but credentials of the present with the help of a past occurrence."

Thus, according to William's view, the second painting emerged as a section of the first with a strong emphasis on figures of William before the princes and flags and Bismarck before the commanders and officers. Only a strict Cuirassier on the left in the foreground, represents the simple soldiers, namely Louis Stellmacher of Lychen of the Gardes du Corps regiment (see picture).

The wall painting survived the air raids on the Zeughaus in November 1943, but was no longer in its frame after further damage to the building at the end of the war.

== Third painting, 1885 ==
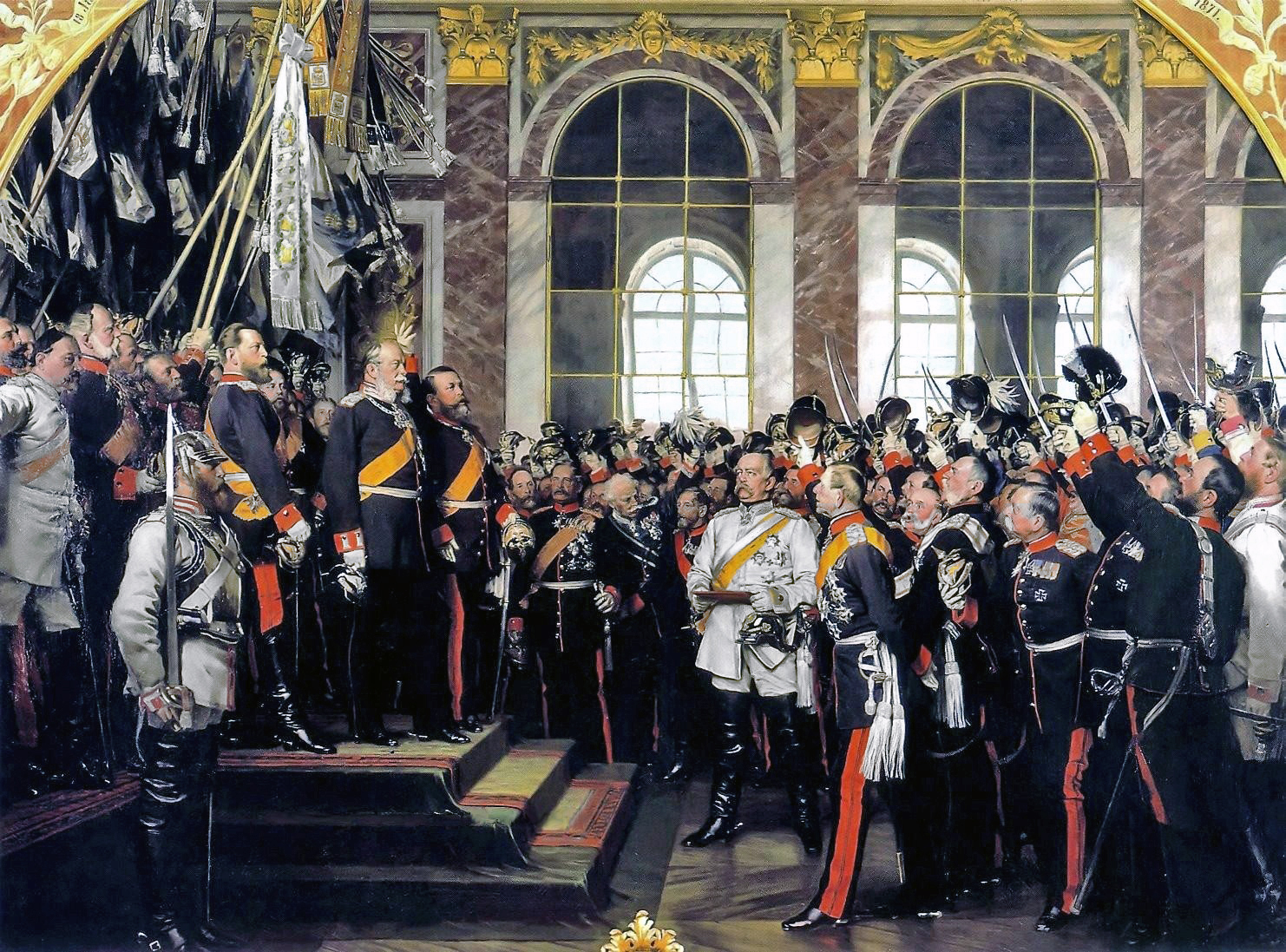
Painting for Otto von Bismarck, handed over on 1 April 1885. Oil on canvas. 1.67 x 2.02m. Otto-von-Bismarck-Stiftung, Friedrichsruh

Werner's second painting, like the Hall of Fame, was also a great success. The Hohenzollern family asked Werner enthusiastically to paint another painting of the imperial proclamation to give it to the "Iron Chancellor" Bismarck for his 70th birthday in 1885. In the brevity of the time, Werner could only satisfy the wish by colouring the black and white model of the Zeughaus. Again the participants had grown older. At the end of March 1885, Werner used a visit to the Grand Duke of Baden in his studio to update his depiction of the painting. One exception was Roon, who had died in 1879 and was not present in 1871. William I had insisted on putting him in the painting because of his close relations to Bismarck. Werner painted Roon as if he would have been a participant at the proclamation. He had portrayed him several times on paintings on the Franco-Prussian War. Werner sacrificed Hartmann's handshake with Blumenthal to make space for Roon. Both moved so closely together that now Hartmann's turn to Blumenthal appears unmotivated.

== Fourth painting, 1913 ==
In 1913, Werner created a barely reproduced fourth painting of the Imperial Proclamation as a wall painting for the new building at the Realgymnasium School in Frankfurt (Oder) (wax paints on canvas, 4.90 x 7.50m). The appearance of this painting was not passed on. In the Second World War it remained undamaged, but was lost after 1945.
