= Titles and emblems of the German Emperor after 1873 =

The German Emperors after 1873 had a variety of titles and coats of arms, which in various compositions became the officially used titles and coats of arms. The title and coat of arms were last fixed in 1873, but the titles did not necessarily mean that the area was really dominated, and sometimes even several princes bore the same title.

In 1817, new titles were introduced for the King of Prussia, the large title, the mid-length title and the short title, parallel to the large, mid-sized and small coats of arms of Prussia.

== The titles of Prussian kings during the German Empire ==
Great Coat of Arms belonging to Wilhelm II as King of Prussia

The titles were complete (represented by William I, German Emperor) after the enactment of 1873:

=== The great title ===
German Version	English Translation
Wir Wilhelm, von Gottes Gnaden König von Preußen, Markgraf zu Brandenburg, Graf zu Hohenzollern, Souveräner und oberster Herzog von Schlesien wie auch der Grafschaft Glatz, Großherzog vom Niederrhein und Posen, Herzog zu Sachsen, Westfalen und Engern, zu Pommern, Lüneburg, Holstein und Schleswig, zu Magdeburg, Bremen, Geldern, Cleve, Jülich und Berg, sowie auch der Wenden und Kaschuben, zu Krossen, Lauenburg, Mecklenburg, Landgraf zu Hessen und Thüringen, Markgraf der Ober- und Niederlausitz, Prinz von Oranien, Fürst zu Rügen, zu Ostfriesland, zu Paderborn und Pyrmont, zu Halberstadt, Münster, Minden, Osnabrück, Hildesheim, zu Verden, Kammin, Fulda, Nassau und Mörs, gefürsteter Graf zu Henneberg, Graf der Mark und zu Ravensberg, zu Hohenstein, Tecklenburg und Lingen, zu Mansfeld, Sigmaringen und Veringen, Herr von Frankfurt.	We Wilhelm, by the Grace of God, King of Prussia, Margrave of Brandenburg, Count of Hohenzollern, Sovereign and Supreme Duke of Silesia, as well as the County of Glatz, Grand Duke of the Lower Rhine and Posen, Duke of Saxony, of Westphalia and Angria, of Pomerania, Lüneburg, Holstein and Schleswig, of Magdeburg, Bremen, Geldern, Cleves, Jülich and Berg, as well as of the Wends and Kashubians, of Crossen, Lauenburg, Mecklenburg, Landgrave of Hesse and Thuringia, Margrave of Upper and Lower Lusatia, Prince of Orange, Prince of Rügen, of East Frisia, of Paderborn and Pyrmont, of Halberstadt, Münster, Minden, Osnabrück, Hildesheim, of Verden, Kammin, Fulda, Nassau and Mörs, Princely Count of Henneberg, Count of the Mark and of Ravensberg, of Hohenstein, Tecklenburg and Lingen, of Mansfield, Sigmaringen and Veringen, Lord of Frankfurt.

=== The mid-sized title ===
German Version	English Translation
Wir Wilhelm, von Gottes Gnaden König von Preußen, Markgraf zu Brandenburg, souveräner und oberster Herzog von Schlesien, Großherzog vom Niederrhein und Posen, Herzog zu Sachsen, Westfalen und Pommern, zu Lüneburg und Bremen, zu Holstein, Schleswig und Lauenburg, Landgraf zu Hessen, Fürst zu Ostfriesland, Osnabrück und Hildesheim, zu Nassau und Fulda, Graf zu Hohenzollern, Herr von Frankfurt.	We Wilhelm, by the Grace of God, King of Prussia, Margrave of Brandenburg, Sovereign and Supreme Duke of Silesia, Grand Duke of the Lower Rhine and Posen, Duke of Saxony, Westphalia and Pomerania, of Lüneburg and Bremen, of Holstein, Schleswig and Lauenburg, Landgrave of Hesse, Prince of East Frisia, Osnabrück and Hildesheim, of Nassau and Fulda, Count of Hohenzollern, Lord of Frankfurt.

=== The short title ===
German Version	English Translation
Wilhelm, von Gottes Gnaden König von Preußen etc. etc. etc.	Wilhelm, by the Grace of God, King of Prussia etc. etc. etc.

== Further titles ==
The decree of 16 August 1873 included a selection from the Emperors' titles. He also had other titles, such as

- From 1900 until 1918: "Tupu Sili" of Samoa. See also Mata'afa Iosefo

== Explanation of the individual titles listed in the great title in their order ==
=== King of Prussia ===
Under its last master Albert in 1525, the State of the Teutonic Order was transformed into the secular Duchy of Prussia under Polish armament. After the death of his successor, the Duke Albert Frederick in 1618, the Duchy of Prussia became a part of the Brandenburg Hohenzollern, who now ruled it in personal union. In the Treaties of Wehlau in 1637 and Oliva in 1660, the Elector Frederick William, the "Great Elector", succeeded in gaining full sovereignty over the Duchy of Prussia, whereby he himself became a European sovereign. His successor, Frederick III of Brandenburg was crowned King Frederick I of Prussia on 18 January 1701, after the Emperor had contractually secured him to recognise him as King of the Holy Roman Empire and in Europe. The name and coat of arms of the Prussian monarch then passed as a result of the new designation of sovereignty and authority könglich-preußisch (royal Prussian) to the entire Prussian state of Hohenzollern, which lay within and outside the empire and for which the name of Prussia prevailed in the eighteenth century.

The restricted in in the King's title recalled that the West of Prussia, Royal Prussia (Warmia and West Prussia) remained under the Polish crown. This terminological refinement was, however, only observed in the German version. In Latin, he called himself "Nos Fridericu, Dei greatia Rex Borussiae,..." and in the French version "Frederic par la grace de Dieu Roi de Prusse...".

After the first Polish partition of 1772 under Frederick II, Warmia, the Netzedistrikt and West Prussia fell to Prussia, so that Frederick II could now be called King of Prussia. This title was passed onto his successors. The last of these successors was Wilhelm II.

=== Margrave of Brandenburg ===
As a result of the King's crowning of 1701, the title of Margrave of Brandenburg came as being the second placed title.

King Sigismund (1368–1437) was Margrave of Brandenburg until 1415. This included Altmark, Mittelmark, Prignitz, the land of Sternberg to the east of the Oder and a part of the Uckermark. The Office of the Archchamberlain of the Holy Roman Empire, and thus the Prince Elector, was awarded to the Margrave of Brandenburg by the Golden Bull in 1356. A delegation of the Mark came to King Sigismund in Ofen in 1411 in order to demand a governor for the Mark in support of the robber knights. The King ordered Frederick IV, Burgrave of Nuremberg from the House of Hohenzollern to be the Supreme Master and Administrator in the Mark. He led the title Wir Friedrich von Gotes Gnaden Margraf zu Brandenburg, des Heiligen Romischen Reiches Ertzkamerer und Burggraf zu Nuremberg (We, Frederick by grace of God, Margrave of Brandenburg, Imperial Holy Roman Archchamberlain and Burgrave of Nuremberg). On 18 April 1417, King Sigismund solemnly granted the burgraviate by handing over the banner with the Margraviate of Brandenburg,

Since then, the Hohenzollerns ruled as margraves in Brandenburg. The institutions of the archchamberlain and electorate expired in 1806 together with their titles, when the Holy Roman Empire ceased to exist. Therefore, only the margrave remained as a title. The ordinance of 30 April 1815 divided the Prussian state into ten provinces, so that the Margraviate of Brandenburg became the province of Brandenburg with three provincial governments.

=== Count of Hohenzollern ===
The Hohenzollerns were counts as reported throughout history. Adalbert (1125) was Count of Zollern. Since the 14th century, the House of Hohenzollern was named after the Hohenzollern mountain, which is located upstream from the Swabian Alb. In 1685, Emperor Leopold I granted the Brandenburgers the title "Count of Hohenzollern". The Prussian kings came from the Frankish line, from which the Brandenburg line developed. The Principalities of Hohenzollern-Hechingen and Hohenzollern-Sigmaringen were ceded by their princes to Prussia on 7 December 1849, and were accepted by Prussian law on 12 March 1850.

=== Sovereign and Supreme Duke of Silesia as well as the County of Glatz ===
Since Poland's King Casimir III, who had recognised Bohemian feudality for Silesia in 1335, Silesia belonged to the Holy Roman Empire. Emperor Charles IV then integrated Silesia into the Reich. Under the rule of the Silesian Piasts, Silesia was divided into 17 principalities. The majority of Silesia was conquered by King Frederick II of Prussia during the Three Silesian Wars (1740–1763) from Austria. At the end of the First Silesian War, the peace of Wroclaw and the Treaty of Berlin from 1742 stood. In accordance with the treaty, the Duchy of Lower Silesia and the County of Kladsko passed "from the crown of Bohemia" to Frederick in full sovereignty and independence. He received Silesia, with the exception of the Duchy of Teschen, the city of Troppau, and the part beyond the Oppa and the high mountains, the Hennersdorf domination, and the Moravian enclaves in Silesia as well as the southern part of the Duchy of Nysa near Austria and the Duchy of Krnov. The Moravian Enclave Kietrz and the former Bohemian County of Kladsko went to Prussia. In the Treaty of Dresden, which ended the Second Silesian War in 1745, the provisions remained intact. The Empire guaranteed this peace in 1751. In his capacity as King of Bohemia, the Austrian Emperor also retained the title of Duke of Upper and Lower Silesia, as can be gathered from the grand title of Emperor Franz Joseph I.

=== Grand Duke of the Lower Rhine and Posen ===
The King of Prussia had this title since 1815.

As a result of the Congress of Vienna, Prussia received the western, small part of its profit from the second partition of Poland under the designation Grand Duchy of Posen. Prussia kept nothing from the third partition. To compensate for this, the territories to the West of Germany were passed over. A decree issued in Vienna on 30 April 1815 created the Prussian province of Jülich-Cleves-Berg and the Grand Duchy of the Lower Rhine. In 1822, the Rhine Province was established from both, with the title of Grand Duke of the Lower Rhine being kept. Over long periods of his history, the Rhineland had not fixed political boundaries. Thus, the name was little more than a geographical concept or a landscape that conceived a multitude of spiritual and secular principalities, counties, imperial abbeys, small dominions and imperial cities.

=== Duke of Saxony ===
In contrast to most of the other states of the Confederation of the Rhine, Saxony had remained loyal to Napoleon during the German Campaign of 1813. Prussia wanted to incorporate the state as a part of Prussia. The complete removal of the Saxon state was prevented at the Congress of Vienna by Austrian state Chancellor Metternich, but Prussia was able to annex three-fifths of Saxony territory. Saxony lost, among other things, the Wittenberg district, the former Duchy of Saxony, next to Torgau, Lower Lusatia, half of Upper Lusatia and all the regions in Thuringia. The King of Prussia therefore called himself Duke of Saxony.

=== Duke of Westphalia ===
The historical region of Westphalia, which included the Duchy of Westphalia and other regions, was distributed since 1810 to the French Empire, the Kingdom of Westphalia, the Grand Duchy of Berg and the Grand Duchy of Hesse. It was renamed after the Congress of Vienna on the basis of the establishment of provincial authorities between Prussia, Hanover and Oldenburg on 30 April 1815. The Principality of Lippe was the only one of the old Westphalian territories to retain its independence. Prussia received the largest part and also included the non-Westphalian territories of Wittgenstein and the sub-principality of Siegen. On top of that, the Siegerland, which was first occupied by the province of the Lower Rhine. After 1850, the city of Lippstadt, which had previously belong to the Prussian-Lippish condominium, was still located in the province of Westphalia. Since the core area was the former Duchy of Westphalia, King Frederick William assumed the title of Duke of Westphalia and Angria and added it to the Prussian Royal titles.

=== Duke of Angria (Engern) ===
According to Widukind of Corvey, before the Frankish conquest, the tribal Duchy of Saxony had already existed from parts of Westphalia, Angria and Eastphalia. During the government of Gelnhausen, after the imperial ban of Henry the Lion by Emperor Frederick I Barbarossa on the grounds of a refusal of the army, the Stem Duchy of Saxony was divided in 1180. The part which lay in the area of the archdiocese of Cologne and the bishopric of Paderborn, were combined into the new Duchy of Westphalia and Angria, which at first belonged to the Archbishop of Cologne, Philipp von Heinsberg. The eastern part went to the Ascanian Bernhard as a "younger" Duchy of Saxony. Thus since the end of the 12th century, the name of Angria has been reduced to use in titles, such as those of rulers of the younger Duchy of Saxony ("Duke of Saxony, Angria and Westphalia"). With the takeover of Westphalia in 1815, the title "Westphalia and Angria" (German: Westfalen und Engern) went to the Prussian King Frederick William III.

=== Duke of Pomerania ===
Pomerania was originally created as a sub-fief of Brandenberg. It was partitioned several times and some portions were annexed by Sweden and Poland. The Margraves of Brandenberg gradually reacquired Pomerania and used the title Duke of Pomerania.

=== Duke of Lüneburg ===
This title was added to reflect the annexation of the Kingdom of Hanover which contained the historic Duchy of Lüneburg.

=== Duke of Holstein and Schleswig ===
Schleswig was a duchy created by the King of Denmark, and eventually the title reverted to the Danish Crown. Holstein was a fief of the Holy Roman Empire that also was inherited by the King of Denmark. After Napoleon's defeat Holstein joined the German Confederation. German nationalist movements within the duchies and a succession dispute to the duchies led to the Second Schleswig War in which the German Confederation led by Austria and Prussia defeated Denmark, forcing its king to renounce the duchies. A disagreement in how to administer them led to the Austro-Prussian War in which Prussia was victorious and annexed both duchies, allowing King William I to add their titles to his grand title.

=== Duke of Magdeburg ===
In 1680 the Archbishopric of Magdeburg was converted into a duchy and given to the Margraves of Brandenburg which ruled it in personal union with their other territories including the Kingdom of Prussia. It was briefly annexed by the Kingdom of Westphalia but returned to and annexed by Prussia after Napoleon's defeat.

=== Duke of Bremen ===
Product of the annexation of Hanover by the Kingdom of Prussia.

=== Duke of Geldern (Guelders) ===
The Dukes of Cleves-Jülich-Berg inherited the Duchy of Guelders, but they later lost possession of it when the inheritance split despite the Cleves-Jülich-Berg branch of the family being confirmed by Holy Roman Emperor Sigusmund. The Kings of Prussia, heirs to the historic Dukes of Cleves-Jülich-Berg, acquired a portion of Guelders in the Treaty of Utrecht following the War of the Spanish Succession, and its capital was Geldern. It was lost during the Napoleonic wars, but a portion of it was regained and annexed to Prussia following Napoleon's defeat.

=== Duke of Cleves, Jülich, and Berg ===
Through intermarriage the Hohenzollerns inherited the claims to these titles. Portions of these territories were acquired by the House of Hohenzollern following the War of the Jülich Succession.

=== Duke of the Wends and Kashubians ===
These ethnic groups had large populations in the regions annexed by Prussia.

=== Duke of Crossen ===
The Elector of Brandenburg acquired the town of Crossen from the Duke Głogów in 1482, confirmed by the King of Bohemia in 1538.

=== Duke of Lauenberg ===
The House of Ascania was enfeoffed with a reduced Duchy of Saxony after the fall of Henry the Lion. The Ascanians divided this duchy into the Duchies of Saxe-Lauenberg and Saxe-Wittenberg. When the male line of the Lauenberg branch died out the House of Welf which ruled Hanover usurped the title, but was later confirmed by the Holy Roman Emperor. After Napoleon's defeat the Welfs gave Saxe-Lauenberg to the King of Denmark. After the Second Schleswig War the King of Denmark renounced the title, and King William I of Prussia, descended from a previous Duke of Saxe-Lauenberg, was elected duke and later annexed Saxe-Lauenberg to Prussia.

=== Duke of Mecklenburg ===
While the title was held by the House of Mecklenburg, the 1442 Treaty of Wittstock declared that in the event the House of Mecklenburg went extinct the Elector of Brandenburg would succeed.

=== Landgrave of Thuringia ===
The Congress of Vienna allowed the King of Prussia to use the title Landgrave of Thuringia by virtue of this annexation of the annexation of the newly created Duchy of Saxony.

=== Margrave of Upper and Lower Lusatia ===
The Congress of Vienna allowed the King of Prussia to use the titles Margrave of Upper and Lower Lusatia and Landgrave of Thuringia by virtue of by virtue of the annexation of the annexation of the newly created Duchy of Saxony.

=== Prince of Orange ===
After the death of William III of England who was also Prince of Orange the King of Prussia claimed the title in dispute with John William Friso of Nassau-Diez. In the Treaty of Utrecht Orange was annexed to France, but both claimants were allowed to use the dynastic title.

=== Prince of Rügen ===
This title was inherited by the Dukes of Pomerania and subsequently by the Hohenzollerns.

=== Prince of East Frisia ===
East Frisia was annexed by Prussia in 1813, ceded to Hanover in 1815, and subsequently reacquired by Prussia when Hanover was annexed.

=== Prince of Paderborn ===
The Prince-Bishopric of Paderborn was secularized in 1802 and given to Prussia, but it was subsequently annexed by the Kingdom of Westphalia only to return to Prussia again as part of the Province of Westphalia.

=== Prince of Pyrmont ===
Starting in 1868 Prussia administered Pyrmont.

=== Prince of Halberstadt ===
In 1648 the Bishopric was secularized into a principality and given to the Elector of Brandenburg.

=== Prince of Münster ===
In 1803 the Bishopric of Münster was secularized with a portion of it given to Prussia, later annexed by the Kingdom of Hanover, and finally Prussia annexed Hanover.

=== Prince of Minden ===
In 1807 the Bishopric of Minden was secularized and annexed Prussia, later annexed by the Kingdom of Westphalia, and then went back to Prussia.

=== Prince of Osnabrück ===
The Prince-Bishopric of Osnabrück was mediatized to the Electorate (later Kingdom) of Hanover which in turn was annexed by Prussia in 1866.

=== Prince of Hildesheim ===
Hildesheim was annexed by Hanover in 1813 which in turn was annexed by Prussia in 1866.

=== Prince of Verden ===
Verden was annexed by Hanover in 1813 which in turn was annexed by Prussia in 1866.

=== Prince of Kammin ===
Kammin was a bishopric under the influence of the Dukes of Pomerania and consequently was ultimately incorporated into the Kingdom of Prussia.

=== Prince of Fulda ===
Fulda was a bishopric, and under Napoleon its territory was divided by several states. Most of its former territory went to the Electorate of Hesse which in turn was annexed by Prussia in 1866.

=== Prince of Nassau ===
The Duchy of Nassau was annexed by Prussia in 1866 following the Austro-Prussian War.

=== Prince of Mörs ===
The County of Mörs was inherited by the King of Prussia when William III of England died. It was later annexed directly to Prussia in 1815.

=== Princely Count of Henneberg ===
The Princely County of Henneberg fell to the House of Wettin when the House of Henneberg went extinct in the male line. Portions of this territory became part of Prussian Saxony in 1815.

=== Count of the Mark and of Ravensberg ===
The Hohenzollerns inherited these titles from John William, Duke of Jülich-Cleves-Berg.

=== Count of Hohenstein ===
Hohenstein is located in Brandenburg.

=== Count of Tecklenburg ===
The County of Tecklenburg was awarded to Prussia by the Congress of Vienna.

=== Count of Lingen ===
Lingen was part of the Kingdom of Hanover which was annexed by Prussia in 1866.

=== Count of Mansfield ===
Mansfeld was part of the Duchy of Saxony annexed by Prussia.

=== Count of Sigmaringen and Veringen ===
Sigamaringen and Veringen were annexed by Prussia with the rest of the Principality of Hohenzollern.

=== Lord of Frankfurt ===
The Free City of Frankfurt was annexed by Prussia in 1866.
