= Franz August Schenk von Stauffenberg =

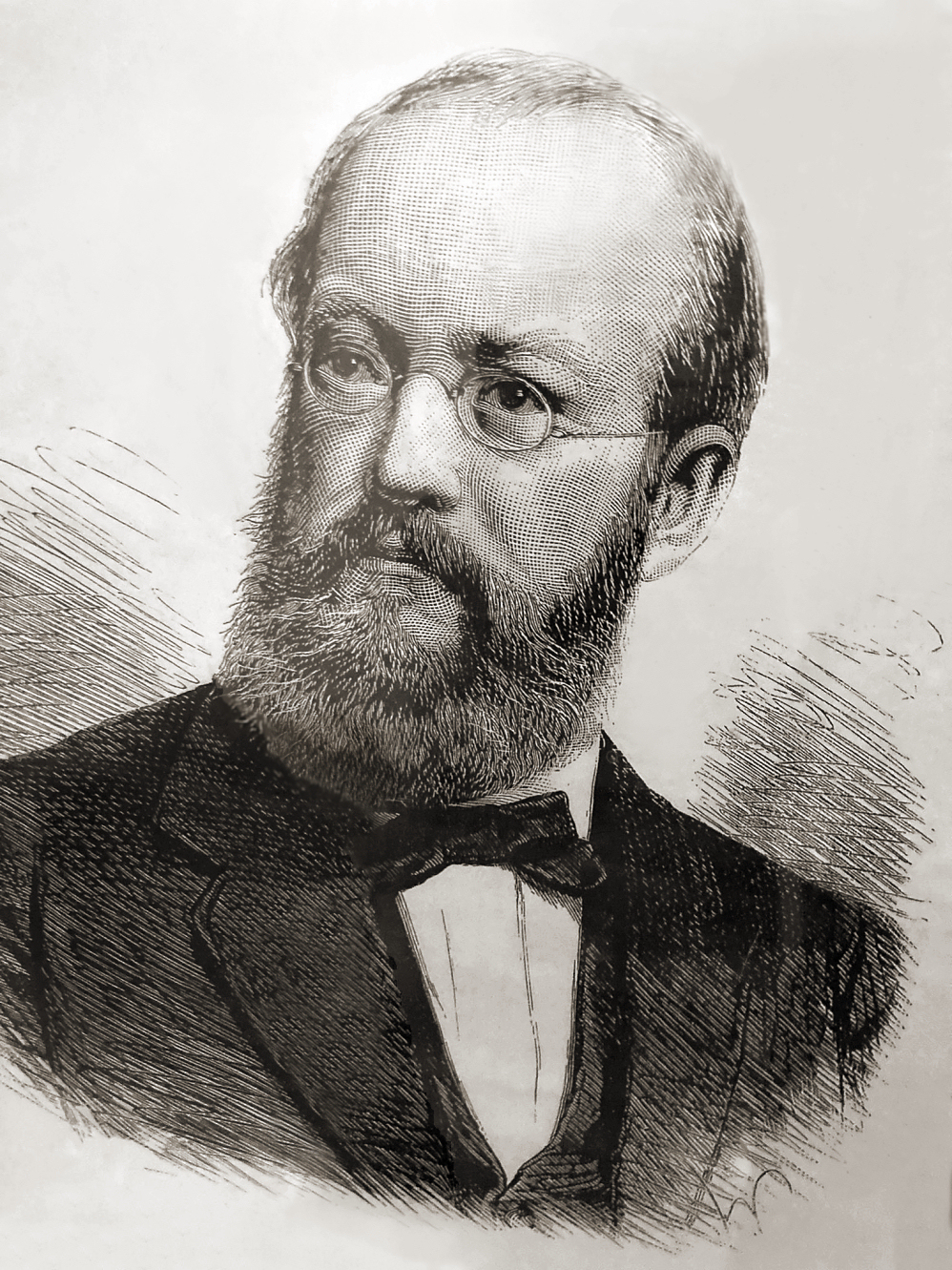
Franz August Schenk von Stauffenberg

Franz August Schenk Freiherr von Stauffenberg (born August 3, 1834 in Würzburg; died June 2, 1901 in Rißtissen) was a German jurist, landowner, and politician. He was president of the Bavarian Landtag and a member of the Reichstag.

Stauffenberg advocated the “Lesser Germany” solution and worked with Chancellor Otto von Bismarck as a national liberal, but later became one of Bismarck's opponents. In 1884, he co-founded the opposition German Free-minded Party (Deutsche Freisinnige Partei, DFP). His hope that Frederick III's accession to the throne in 1888 would bring about political change was not fulfilled. Stauffenberg was praised for his extraordinary intelligence and education, his diplomatic talent, and his balanced sense of justice based on firm principles.

== Family ==
Franz August was the son of Reichsfreiherr (baron) Friedrich Schenk von Stauffenberg (born October 23, 1806, in Wetzlar; died May 2, 1874, in Rißtissen) and his wife, Reichsgräfin Karoline Klementine Butler von Clonebough, (born Haimhausen, January 31, 1812, in Ansbach; died November 6, 1879, in Lindau). Franz August's uncle, Franz Ludwig Schenk Freiherr von Stauffenberg (1801–1881, from 1874 Graf), was the great-grandfather of Claus and Berthold Schenk Grafen von Stauffenberg, who were executed after their assassination attempt on Adolf Hitler.

Stauffenberg lived mainly in Rißtissen (today Ehingen, in Baden-Württemberg), with additional properties in Wilflingen (Langenenslingen) and Geislingen (Zollernalbkreis). On August 25, 1860, he married Reichsgräfin Ida Therese von Geldern-Egmont (born October 16, 1837 in Schloss Thurnstein; died March 27, 1887 in Pallanza). They had ten children, five of whom died in infancy. His tenth child, Franz Schenk von Stauffenberg, was the only son to survive and inherited his estate.

- Wilhelmine A. Therese Johanna Maria Schenkin von Stauffenberg (* June 24, 1861 in Augsburg; † March 10, 1876 in Menton).
- Friedrich Adam Maria Sebastian Vinzenz Schenk Freiherr von Stauffenberg (* January 20, 1863 in Augsburg; † January 30, 1863 in Augsburg).
- Elisabeth Klementine Gabriele Maria Schenk Freiherrin von Stauffenberg (* February 15, 1864 in Augsburg; † April 20, 1939 in Ulm): married Hugo Freiherr von Linden on July 3, 1893 in Rißtissen.
- Walter Ludwig Friedrich Gotthold Agatha Maria Schenk Freiherr von Stauffenberg (* February 21, 1865 in Augsburg; † September 30, 1865 in Augsburg).
- Olga Gabriele Schenk Freiherrin von Stauffenberg (* September 11, 1866; † March 23, 1953 in Wiesenfelde): married Friedrich Graf von Otting und Fünfstetten on May 6th, 1902 in Rißtissen, and was lady-in-waiting (Hofdame) to Duchess Margarete Sophie, wife of Herzog (duke) Albrecht von Württemberg. The couple had three sons: Maximilian, Franz and Ludwig Grafen von Ottingen und Fünfstetten.
- Johanna Friederike Klementine Marie Freiherrin von Stauffenberg (* February 16, 1868 in Rißtissen; † July 19, 1868 in Rißtissen).
- Gabriele Philippine Marie Barbara Schenk Freiherrin von Stauffenberg (* December 4, 1869 in Rißtissen; † October 18, 1956 in Munich): married Gustav Freiherr von Habermann on April 8th, 1896 in Munich.
- Friedrich W. Schenk Freiherr von Stauffenberg (* September 2, 1873 in Rißtissen; † October 25, 1873 in Rißtissen).
- Unnamed Daughter (* July 18, 1874 in Rißtissen; † Juli 19, 1874 in Rißtissen).
- Franz Wilhelm Karl Maria Gabriel Schenk Freiherr von Stauffenberg (* August 14, 1878 in Rißtissen; † November 9, 1950 in Riedlingen): married Huberta Gräfin Wolff-Metternich on May 27th, 1903 in Bonn.

== Education and career ==
He began studying law at the University of Würzburg in 1851 and at the University of Heidelberg from 1853. In 1853 he became an active member of the Corps Guestphalia Heidelberg. His legal career was short lived. He became a legal trainee in 1857 and in 1860 a prosecutor (Staatsanwalt). From 1863 he was a prosecutor in Augsburg where he exercised until 1866, when he left of his own accord. The decision to leave the post so early came from contrasting feelings regarding his suitability for the profession together with moral gripes on death sentence. Afterwards, he dedicated himself for some years to the care of his family's estate in Rißtissen.

== Political career ==
=== Bavarian Landtag ===
On September 30, 1866, Stauffenberg was elected to the Bavarian Landtag in a by-election in Augsburg, where he remained a member until 1898, serving as its president from 1871 to 1875.

Stauffenberg's assertivness and brilliant oratory skills were already evident in his first parliamentary motion: on February 20, 1867, he called for the abolition of the death penalty in the Kingdom of Bavaria.

As a prosecutor in Augsburg, Stauffenberg had to spend time with death row inmates during their last hours which left a deep impression on him. Among other things, he justified his motion by arguing that the death penalty could not deter anyone from committing a crime. According to him, one should not equate the state of mind of a criminal before and after the crime; almost all criminals believed they would not be convicted before committing the crime. All arguments justifying the death penalty paled in comparison to the execution of a single innocent person. The state, as a collective of citizens, like any individual, could only justifiably claim a person's life in situations of self-defense (Notwehr) or absolute emergency. His motion received an unexpected majority of 87:44 votes in the Landtag, but was rejected by the Reichsrat on November 16, 1867. The session was chaired by Stauffenberg's uncle, Franz Ludwig Schenk von Stauffenberg. On May 19, 1870, he submitted his motion for a second time, but it failed in the Landtag

=== National-Liberal member of Parliament ===
Stauffenberg advocated German unification under Prussian leadership, excluding Austria (the “Lesser Germany” solution). He differed from the view held by the vast majority of South German liberals, who sought a German Empire under Austrian leadership (the “Greater Germany” solution).

He served in the German Customs Union (Zollparlament or Zollverein) beginning in February 1868 and, following the founding of the German Empire, was elected to the Reichstag for the first of eight terms as a representative of Munich in the 1871 Reichstag election. He would serve then for Braunschweig 3 (Holzminden) in 1878, and for Middle Franconia 2 (Erlangen-Fürth) in 1881 and 1884 for a total of 22 years in the Reichstag, serving as its vice president from 1876 to 1879.

Stauffenberg initially belonged to the National Liberal Party (Nationalliberale Partei, NLP), which politically supported Otto von Bismarck. Bismarck had intended to appoint Stauffenberg as a minister, but Emperor Wilhelm I rejected the appointment due to Stauffenberg’s political views. Stauffenberg sought to strengthen citizens’ civil liberties and local self-governance, abolish tariffs (free trade), and limit state intervention of any kind. He sought to expand the limited powers of the Reichstag in the Empire and ultimately aspired to a parliamentary monarchy modeled on the British system.

Founding members of the German Free-minded Party. Stauffenberg on the left.

=== Bismark's opponent ===
Bismarck’s shift from a free-trade policy to a protectionist policy in 1878 put the existing cooperation with the NLP to the test. With the help of some National Liberal members of parliament, Bismarck was able to push through with his policy and, in 1880, secure another seven-year term (Septennat) in the Reichstag. Stauffenberg and others accused their party colleagues of betraying fundamental liberal principles and weakening the Reichstag’s position toward the executive branch, which brought to a split from the National Liberal Party.

This split gave rise to a new party, the Liberal Union (Liberale Vereinigung), which, in the 1881 Reichstag election, won 46 seats from the get-go, achieving the same parliamentary strength as the NLP. In 1884, the Liberal Union merged with Eugen Richter’s German Progressive Party to form the new German Free-minded Party (Deutsche Freisinnige Partei, DFP). Stauffenberg became chairman of the central committee, while the radical-liberal Eugen Richter became chairman of the new party’s seven-member executive committee.

When it was founded in March 1884, the Free-minded Party was the second-largest faction in the Reichstag with 100 seats, right after the Centre Party (Deutsche Zentrumspartei, DZP); however, it lost a third of its votes in the October elections of that same year and was able to retain only 65 seats in total. Just 13 years after the founding of the German Empire and during a period of great economic prosperity, German voters wanted neither domestic political unrest nor a strong anti-Bismarck party. Stauffenberg and Richter were in bitter opposition to Bismarck’s policies and Stauffenberg himself recognized the importance of the social question.He rejected Bismarck’s Socialist Laws (Sozialistengesetze), which were aimed at suppressing the Social Democrats, as well as his Social Legislation (Sozialgesetzgebung); although Stauffenberg supported the introduction of unemployment benefits, he wanted them to be organized under private law rather than by the state.

On January 11, 1887, Stauffenberg proposed in the Reichstag Bismark's motion to increase troop strength, although only for three years, rather than the requested seven. Stauffenberg’s proposition was adopted on January 14, 1887, by a vote of 186 to 154. Bismarck subsequently dissolved the Reichstag and called for new elections. In the 1887 Reichstag elections, which were dominated by a conservative-national-liberal alliance, and the DFP’s seats were reduced once again by half to 32. The conservative coalition supporting Bismarck was thus significantly strengthened.

Crown prince Friedrich Wilhelm

=== Connection to the crown prince ===
After breaking with Bismarck, both Stauffenberg and Richter set their hopes on the period following the death of the elderly Emperor Wilhelm I, who had appointed Bismarck. Stauffenberg was politically and personally close to his successor, Friedrich Wilhelm (later Kaiser Friedrich III) and his English wife, crown princess Victoria. In 1884, Victoria is said to have encouraged Stauffenberg to found a liberal party modeled on the English system. The purpose of such a party was to provide the crown prince, in anticipation of the supposedly imminent succession to the throne, with a strong, liberal faction—excluding the National Liberal Party—as a platform for forming a liberal government, intended to make it easier for the Friedrich Wilhelm to replace Bismarck’s conservative government.

It is doubtful whether Friedrich Wilhelm would have taken advantage of this offer, which was expressly supported by Victoria, since he held relatively limited liberal views. These encompassed only the granting of personal civil liberties to citizens (e.g., freedom of speech, freedom of education, freedom of religion) and, in terms of constitutional law, the principle of a truly constitutional monarchy. Above all, he rejected the way in which existing constitutional norms were frequently and unrestrained disregarded by the Bismarck government, thereby coming into conflict with both Bismarck and the majority of German princes, whose views were rooted in enlightened absolutism. At Bismarck’s suggestion, Emperor Wilhelm I appealed to his son to maintain his loyalty to the Chancellor and to the government he had appointed, unconditionally and without restriction. In matters of constitutional law, however, the crown prince held conservative views: unlike his wife who was consistently liberal on this point as well, the prince instinctively, though rarely explicitly, opposed left-liberal parties that, like Stauffenberg’s DFP, sought to expand the powers of the Reichstag at the expense of those of the Emperor.

=== The 99-Day Government ===
When Wilhelm I died on March 9, 1888, at the age of 91, his successor was already seriously ill with laryngeal cancer. Bismarck warned the new Emperor, Friedrich III, that a government led by a liberal chancellor would inevitably end in a republican venture. The terminally ill Friedrich consequently kept Bismarck in office and merely dismissed his brother-in-law, the Prussian Minister of the Interior Robert von Puttkamer. Not least because of the DFP’s weakness in the Reichstag, the emperor, who by now was no longer able to speak, remained extremely politically permissive toward Bismarck. Even innocuous request to award an order to his liberal friends, the historian Theodor Mommsen, the physician Rudolf Virchow, and to Stauffenberg himself, failed due to Bismarck’s threat to resign. After a reign of only 99 days, Emperor Friedrich III died on June 15, 1888, without having exerted any significant political influence on the government. His son, Emperor Wilhelm II, was, like his father, no friend of Bismarck’s, but unlike him, extremely conservative in his views. With the death of Friedrich III, all hopes of Stauffenberg and the liberals for the formation of a government had vanished.

=== The "Emperor Friedrich Legend" ===
Even after Friedrich III’s death, Stauffenberg remained in contact with his now politically isolated widow Victoria (“Empress Friedrich”). He is regarded as one of the architects of the “Emperor Friedrich Legend”, which was promoted by liberals and his widow. According to this legend, had Emperor Friedrich III been granted a longer reign, he would have created a better future for Germany—one rooted not in authority but in the will of the people. Today, many historians cast doubt on this hypothesis due to the monarch’s politically ambivalent views.

== Retirement to private life ==
In the 1890 Reichstag election, the year of Bismarck’s dismissal, Stauffenberg’s party was able to double its seats to over 60; nevertheless, Stauffenberg resigned from the Reichstag in 1892 due to his diabetes and retired to Rißtissen and Munich. In 1893, due to internal programmatic contradictions, the Free-minded Party split into the right-liberal Free-minded Union (Freisinnige Vereinigung; FVG) and the left-liberal Free-minded People's Party (Freisinnige Volkspartei, FVP). Stauffenberg joined the Union but declined to run in the 1893 elections. He also left the Bavarian Landtag in 1898.

Stauffenberg died in 1901. In 1910, nine years after his death, under pressure from declining voter support for the liberal parties, both wings of the Free-minded Party reunited and merged with the German People's Party to form the Progressive People’s Party (Fortschrittliche Volkspartei, FVP).

== Honors ==
LL. D. honoris causa from the University of Würzburg (1892)
