= FVP =

FVP may refer to:

== Politics ==
- Free-minded People's Party (Germany) (German: Freisinnige Volkspartei), 1893-1910
- Progressive People's Party (Germany) (German: Fortschrittliche Volkspartei), 1910-1918
- Free People's Party (Germany) (German: Freie Volkspartei), 1956-1957

== Chemistry ==
- Flash vacuum pyrolysis
