= German Free-minded Party =

Political party in the German Empire

German Free-minded Party Deutsche Freisinnige Partei
- Chairman of the Central Committee: Franz von Stauffenberg (1884–1893)
- Chairman of the Executive Committee: Rudolf Virchow (1884–1893)
- Chairman of the Select Committee: Eugen Richter (1884–1890); Karl Schrader (1890); Eugen Richter (1890–1893)
- Founded: 5 March 1884; 141 years ago
- Dissolved: 7 May 1893; 132 years ago
- Merger of: German Progress Party; Liberal Union
- Succeeded by: Free-minded People's Party; Free-minded Union
- Newspaper: Parlamentarische Korrespondenz
- Ideology: Liberalism (German); Radicalism
- Political position: Left-wing
- Colours: Yellow

The German Free-minded Party (German: Deutsche Freisinnige Partei, DFP) or German Radical Party was a short-lived liberal party in the German Empire, founded on 5 March 1884 as a result of the merger of the German Progress Party and the Liberal Union, an 1880 split-off of the National Liberal Party.

== Policies ==
The economists Ludwig Bamberger and Georg von Siemens as well as the liberal politician Eugen Richter were among the prime movers of the merger in the view of the forthcoming accession of the considered liberal Crown Prince Frederick William to the throne (which took place only in 1888). Richter aspired to build up a strong united liberal force in the Reichstag parliament, similar to the British Liberal Party under William Ewart Gladstone. The Free-minded Party supported the expansion of parliamentarism in the German constitutional monarchy, separation of church and state and Jewish emancipation.

Under party chairman Franz August Schenk von Stauffenberg along with his deputies Albert Hänel and Rudolf Virchow, the Free-minded Party received disappointing 17.6% of the votes in the 1884 federal election, representing a drop of 3.6% from the combined parties' results in the previous 1881 federal election. The main beneficiaries of this defection were the Conservative forces, supporting the protectionist, colonialist and anti-socialist policies of Chancellor Otto von Bismarck. In the 1887 federal election, the party again lost half of their seats, falling to 32 Reichstag mandates. Though urged by his wife Princess Royal Victoria, Crown Prince Frederick William did not dare court trouble with Bismarck by openly taking the party's side. His early death in 1888 and the accession of his son William II terminated all liberal hopes.

During the decline in support, the differences between progressives and centre-right liberals became irreconcilable. Upon Bismarck's death in 1890, the parties lost their common adversary. In 1893, the Free-minded Party split in conflict over Chancellor Leo von Caprivi's policies into the Free-minded People's Party and the Free-minded Union. A re-union took place in 1910, when both further weakened liberal parties merged with the German People's Party to form the Progressive People's Party.

== Notable members ==
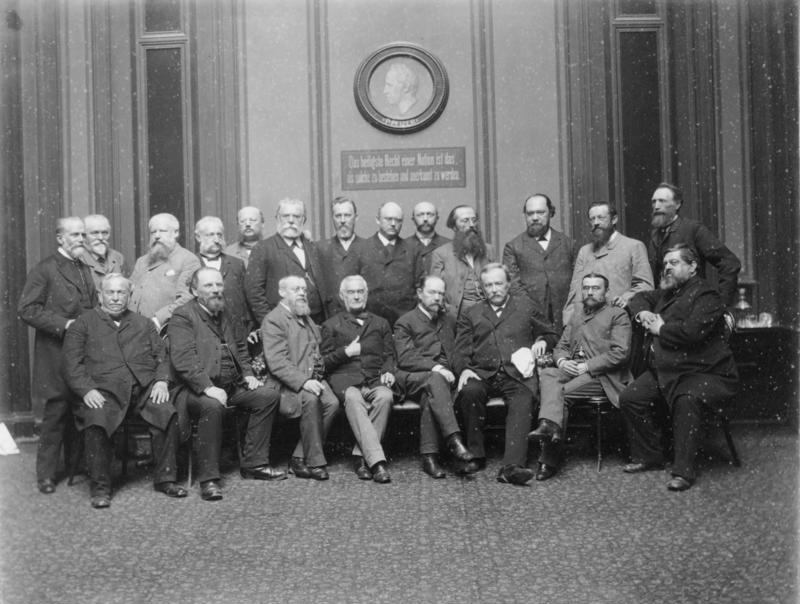
Members of the Free-minded Party at the Reichstag foyer, 1889, Heinrich Berling, Erwin Lüders, Philipp Schmieder, Moritz Klotz, Adolph Hoffmann, Max von Forckenbeck, Paul Kohli, Alexander Meyer, Paul Langerhans, Albert Traeger, Julius Lerche, Friedrich Witte, Georg von Siemens, August Munckel, Eugen Richter, August Maager, Asmus Lorenzen, Friedrich Schenck, Johann Heinrich Nickel, Reinhart Schmidt, Max Broemel.

- Ludwig Bamberger
- Theodor Barth
- Max von Forckenbeck
- Albert Hänel
- Max Hirsch
- Albert Kalthoff
- Ludwig Loewe
- Theodor Mommsen
- Eugen Richter
- Heinrich Edwin Rickert
- Georg von Siemens
- Rudolf Virchow
- Ludwig Büchner

== See also ==
- Contributions to liberal theory
- Liberal democracy
- Liberalism
- Liberalism in Germany
- Liberalism worldwide
- List of liberal parties

Preceded by German Progress Party	liberal German parties 1884–1893	Succeeded by Free-minded People's Party
Preceded by Liberal Union	liberal German parties 1884–1893	Succeeded by Free-minded Union
