= Free-minded Union =

Free-minded Union Freisinnige Vereinigung
- Founded: 1893
- Dissolved: 6 March 1910
- Split from: German Free-minded Party
- Merged into: Progressive People's Party
- Ideology: Liberalism (German)
- Political position: Centre-left (Note: Formed by a secession from the left-wing German Free-minded Party in protest against Eugen Richter's leadership, the party occupied a position between the centre and the left in the Reichstag. While often aligned with left-liberalism, its composition also included national liberal elements. Some sources referred to FVG as "left-wing".)
- Colours: Yellow

The Free-minded Union (German: Freisinnige Vereinigung; FVG) or Radical Union was a liberal party in the German Empire that existed from 1893 to 1910.

== Emergence ==
Inside its predecessor, the German Free-minded Party, there had always been tensions between the leftist and the moderate wing. Another contentious point was the personalist style of leader Eugen Richter. When Chancellor Leo von Caprivi presented an army bill in parliament on 6 May 1893, seven Free-minded representatives, among them Georg von Siemens, decided to accept the motion. Consequently, Richter urged successfully the expulsion of the deviants. Other moderate party members, including Ludwig Bamberger and Theodor Barth, left voluntarily and formed the Free-minded Union. The left liberal wing of the Free-mindeds, loyal to Richter, assembled in the Free-minded People's Party

The new party focused on political and economically liberal positions. In the federal election of 1893, it won 13 seats. The union was initially more a loose electoral alliance than a real party. Its organisational structure was very weak. Its stronghold were in northern and eastern Germany. Together with the governing National Liberal Party and unlike the German Free-minded Party, the Free-minded Union supported the Imperial Navy arms race and the German colonial policy.

== Merger with the National-Social Association ==
In 1903, the electoral unsuccessful social liberal and progressive Christian National-Social Association, led by the parson Friedrich Naumann, merged into the Free-minded Union. This brought new members, including Hellmut von Gerlach, to the party. Both the organisational structure and the programmatical outlook changed from this incident on. Influenced by the ideas of Joseph Chamberlain, the party tended now to compassion towards the masses of the working class, but also tried to strengthen the German national position outwards by closing the ranks of the middle and working classes. This was compatible with the union's liberal nationalist line. The gain of the National Socials' local structures led to a development of a loose notables' association towards a members' party. However, the party could not really win the support of the working class and did not become a major party.

== Merger into the Progressive People's Party ==
From 1905 onward, the Free-minded Union cooperated increasingly with the other left liberals, namely the Free-minded People's Party and the German People's Party. In 1907, the three parties drafted a common electoral program for the elections to the Reichstag. Afterwards, they formed a common parliamentary group, which was part of the pro-government imperialist Bernhard von Bülow bloc together with the Conservatives and National Liberals. The party's own left-wing and pacifist faction, including Theodor Barth, Hellmut von Gerlach, Rudolf Breitscheid and feminist Helene Lange, were discontent with this step and left to form the Democratic Union.

In 1910, the Free-minded Union, Free-minded People's Party and German People's Party merged into the Progressive People's Party.

== Notes ==
Preceded by German Free-minded Party	liberal German parties 1893-1910	Succeeded by Progressive People's Party
