= 1887 German federal election =

- 21 February 1887

All 397 seats in the Reichstag 199 seats needed for a majority
- Registered: 9,769,654 ▲4.12%
- Turnout: 7,570,710 (77.49%) ▲16.94pp
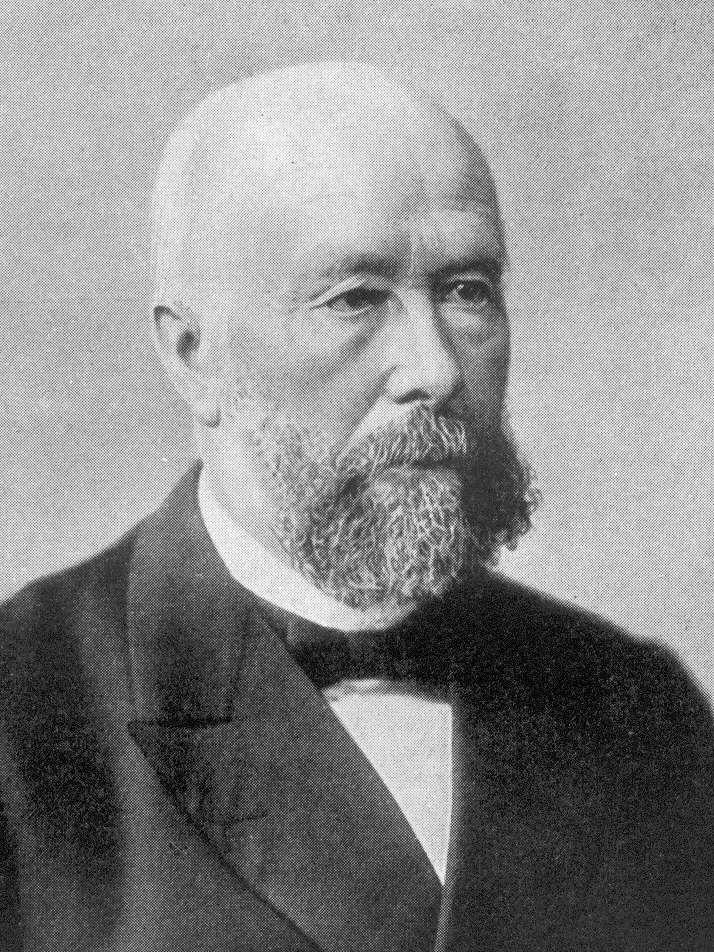

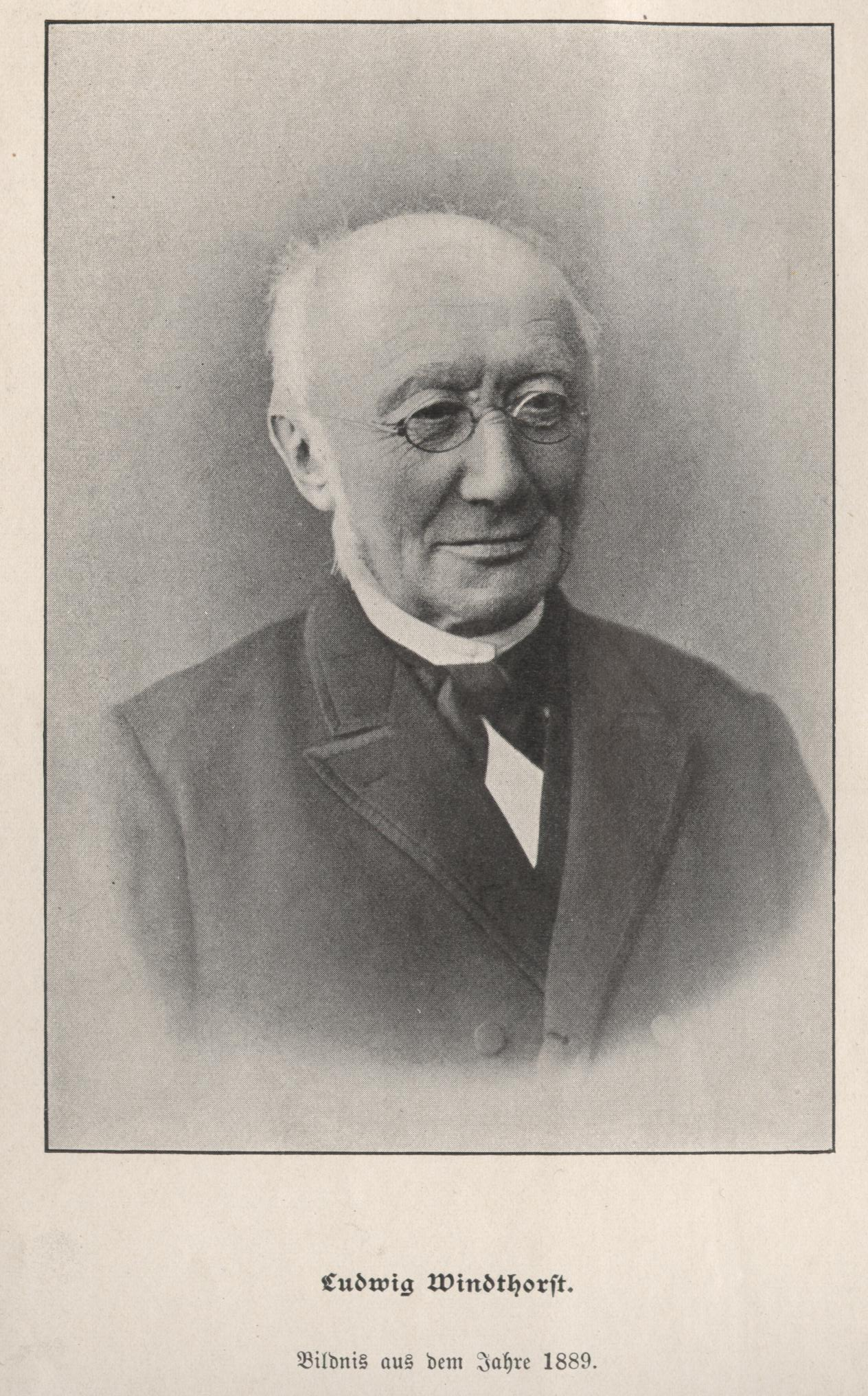

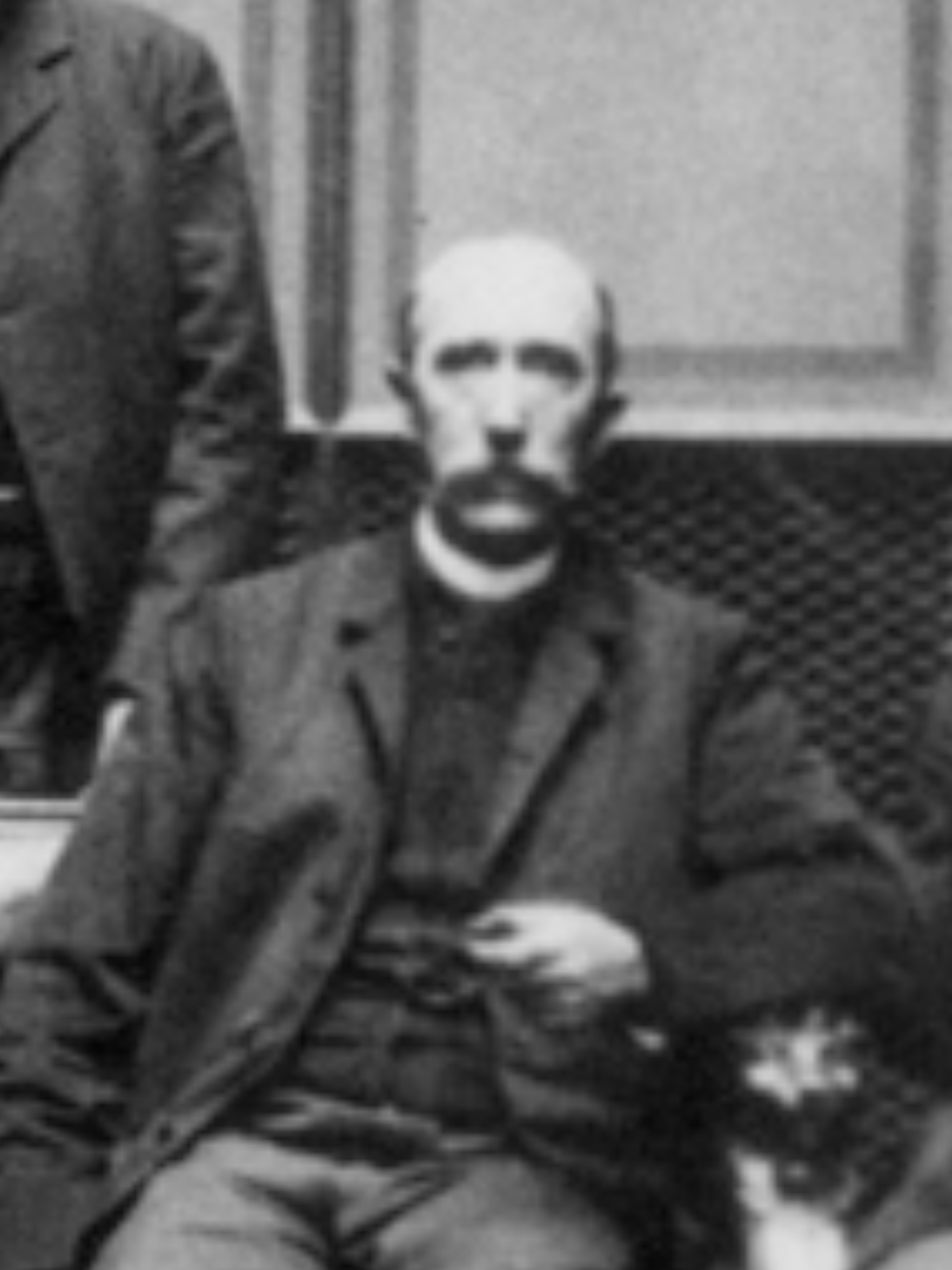

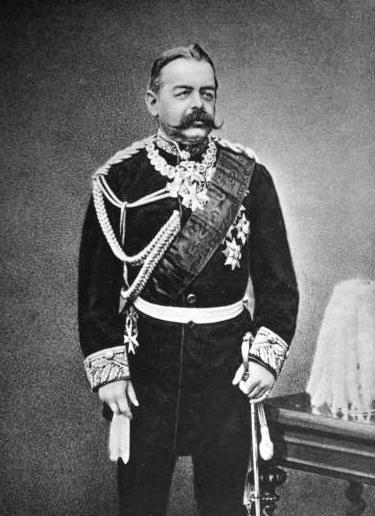

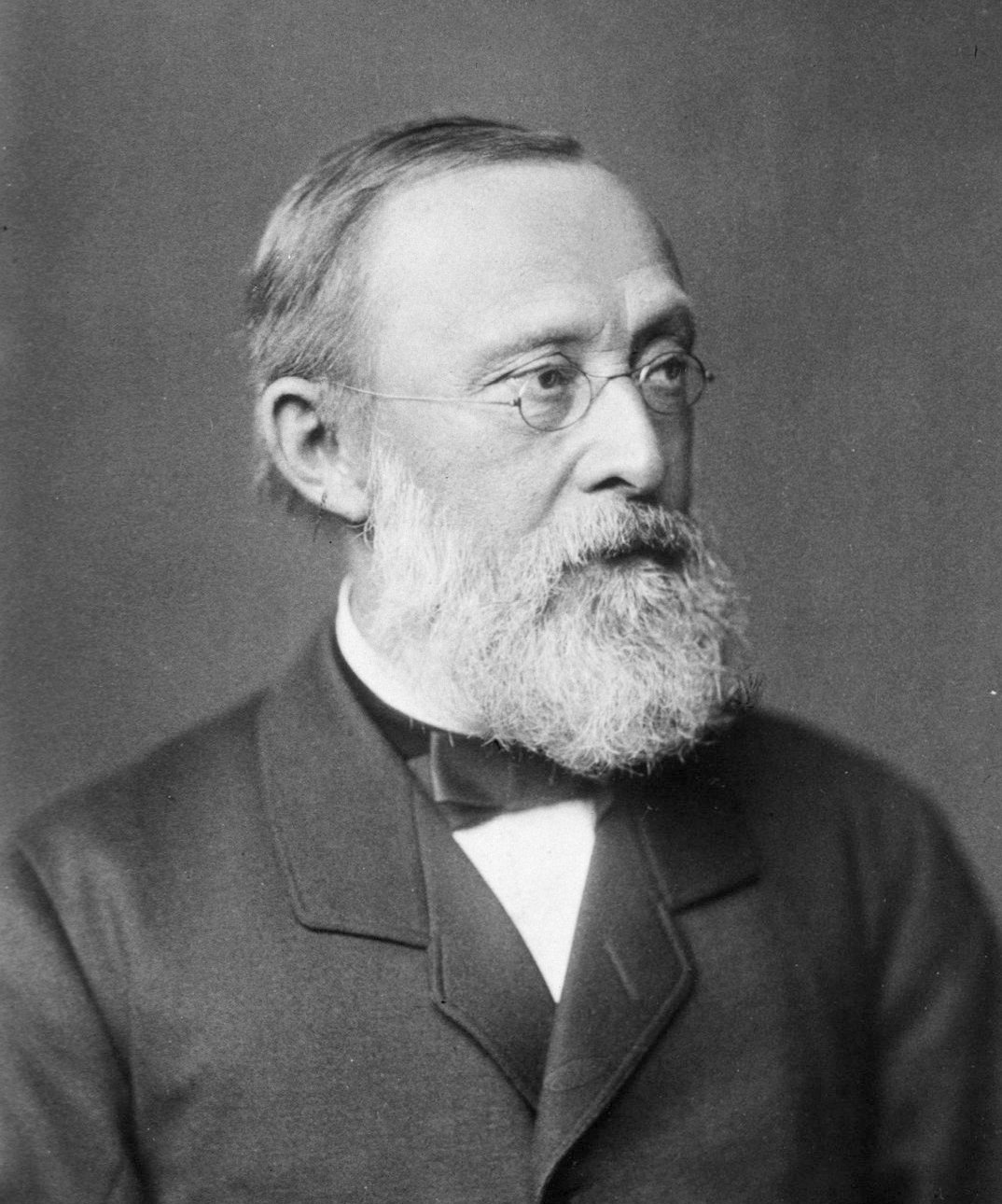
	First party	Second party	Third party
Leader	Rudolf von Bennigsen	Ludwig Windthorst	Otto von Helldorff
Party	NLP	Centre	DKP
Leader since	1867	26 May 1874	7 June 1876
Last election	17.44%, 50 seats	22.52%, 99 seats	15.16%, 78 seats
Seats won	98	98	80
Seat change	▲48	▼1	▲2
Popular vote	1,651,288	1,501,774	1,147,200
Percentage	21.90%	19.91%	15.21%
Swing	▲4.46 pp	▼2.61 pp	▲0.05 pp
	Fourth party	Fifth party	Sixth party
			Polen
Leader	Viktor I, Duke of Ratibor	Rudolf Virchow
Party	DRP	DFP	Polish Party
Leader since		5 March 1884
Last election	6.85%, 28 seats	17.28%, 66 seats	3.71%, 16 seats
Seats won	41	32	13
Seat change	▲13	▼34	▼3
Popular vote	736,389	951,861	227,835
Percentage	9.77%	12.62%	3.02%
Swing	▲2.92 pp	▼4.66 pp	▼0.69 pp
- Map of results (by constituencies)
President of the Reichstag before election
Wilhelm von Wedell-Piesdorf
DKP
President of the Reichstag after election
Wilhelm von Wedell-Piesdorf
DKP

A federal election for the seventh Reichstag of the German Empire was held on 21 February 1887. It was an early election called after Chancellor Otto von Bismarck requested the dissolution of the Reichstag elected in October 1884 because it had refused to accept his seven-year military budget. He thought that a newly elected Reichstag would be more likely to pass the bill, and his hopes proved well-founded. The parties that supported him – the German Conservative Party, the German Reich Party and the National Liberals – gained 63 seats, enough to give them a 55% majority in the new Reichstag. It quickly passed the military budget.

== Background ==
The 1887 election was the second during the German Empire to be held early (the first was in 1878). On 14 January 1887, at the request of Chancellor Otto von Bismarck, Emperor Wilhelm I dissolved the Reichstag elected in October 1884, ten months before its three-year term was due to expire. Bismarck took the step because the Reichstag, which lacked a clear majority bloc of any like-minded parties, had refused to pass his proposed seven-year military budget. In response to France's accelerated program for military training under Minister of War Georges Boulanger, it contained a 10 percent increase in the strength of the army. The Centre Party and German Free-minded Party, together with the National Liberal Party, German Conservative Party and German Reich Party, supported the increase in strength. The Centre and Free-minded parties, however, refused to accept the budget's seven-year term and insisted that it be limited to three years. Bismarck spoke twice in front of the Reichstag, supported the second time by 87-year-old Chief of the General Staff Helmuth von Moltke, without being able to sway the vote in his favor. He then abruptly presented an order to dissolve the Reichstag which the Emperor had already signed. Bismarck's hope was that a new Reichstag would be more favorable towards his plans.

== Campaign ==
The campaign naturally centered around the military budget and whether the Reichstag or the emperor and the Reich government should be making the key decisions about the military. The German Conservative Party, German Reich Party and National Liberals formed a cartel In order to have as many pro-Bismarck candidates elected as possible. They sponsored joint candidates and made provisions for handling potential runoff elections. The National Liberal Party's appeal to the electorate stressed the need for a strong army to protect peace and security. It saw the lack of unity in the Reichstag as a grave threat to the still young nation:

We make this appeal to all Germans ... whose hearts are concerned about the future of the Fatherland, who respect the security and independence of the newly established German Reich more than the ruthless assertion of factional programs, and who see in the struggle over the legal foundations of our German army ... a grave danger for a prosperous and progressive development within the country. ... We are confident that the German people will once again victoriously reject all temptations and enticements to relapse into the old disunity and internal strife under which we suffered and perished for centuries.

== Electoral system ==
The election was held under general, equal, direct and secret suffrage. All German males over the age of 25 years were able to vote except for active members of the military and recipients of poor relief. The restrictions on the military were meant to keep it from becoming politicized, while men on relief were considered to be open to political manipulation. The constitutional guarantee of a secret vote was not safeguarded at the time, since ballot boxes and polling booths were not introduced until 1903.

If no candidate in a district won an absolute majority of the votes, a runoff election was held between the first- and second-place finishers. It was possible for a replacement candidate to be introduced in a runoff.

== Results ==
The election was a clear victory for Bismarck. The three cartel parties picked up 53 additional seats for a total of 219 out of 397, giving them a 55% majority. The National Liberal Party jumped to first place in terms of votes won but was tied with the second place Centre Party in number of seats; both had 98. The German Free-minded Party and Social Democratic Party of Germany suffered the greatest losses of seats (34 and 13 respectively).

On 11 March 1887, just a few weeks after the election, the Reichstag approved Bismarck's military budget with the seven-year period he wanted.

The Reichstag amended Article 24 of the Constitution of the German Empire effective 19 March 1888 to lengthen the Reichstag's term of office from three to five years.

Graph of the party split among 397 seats.
Party	Votes	%	+/–	Seats	+/–
National Liberal Party	1,651,288	21.90	+4.46	98	+48
Centre Party	1,501,774	19.91	−2.61	98	−1
German Conservative Party	1,147,200	15.21	+0.05	80	+2
German Free-minded Party	951,861	12.62	−4.66	32	−34
Social Democratic Party	763,102	10.12	+0.41	11	−13
German Reich Party	736,389	9.77	+2.92	41	+13
Alsace-Lorraine parties	233,685	3.10	+0.18	15	0
Polish Party	227,835	3.02	−0.69	13	−3
German-Hanoverian Party	119,441	1.58	−0.12	4	−7
German People's Party	88,818	1.18	−0.51	0	−7
Independent liberals	73,080	0.97	+0.47	3	+1
Independent conservatives	13,531	0.18	+0.14	0	0
Danish Party	12,360	0.16	−0.10	1	0
Independent anti-semites	11,593	0.15	+0.15	1	+1
Others	8,826	0.12	−0.09	0	0
Unknown	157	0.00	0.00	0	0
Total	7,540,940	100.00	–	397	0
Valid votes	7,540,940	99.61			
Invalid/blank votes	29,770	0.39			
Total votes	7,570,710	100.00			
Registered voters/turnout	9,769,654	77.49			
Source: Wahlen in Deutschland

=== Alsace-Lorraine ===
Party	Votes	%	+/–	Seats	+/–
Protesters	150,734	59.46	+3.81	10	+1
Clericals	57,639	22.74	−8.76	5	0
Autonomists	25,312	9.98	+1.27	0	−1
German Reich Party	16,862	6.65	+5.17	0	0
National Liberal Party	1,845	0.73	New	0	0
Social Democratic Party	673	0.27	−1.53	0	0
Others	452	0.18	−0.66	0	0
Total	253,517	100.00	–	15	0
Valid votes	253,517	96.66			
Invalid/blank votes	8,747	3.34			
Total votes	262,264	100.00			
Registered voters/turnout	314,796	83.31			
Source: Wahlen in Deutschland
