= 1884 German federal election =

- 28 October 1884

All 397 seats in the Reichstag 199 seats needed for a majority
- Registered: 9,383,074 ▲3.22%
- Turnout: 5,681,628 (60.55%) ▲4.25pp
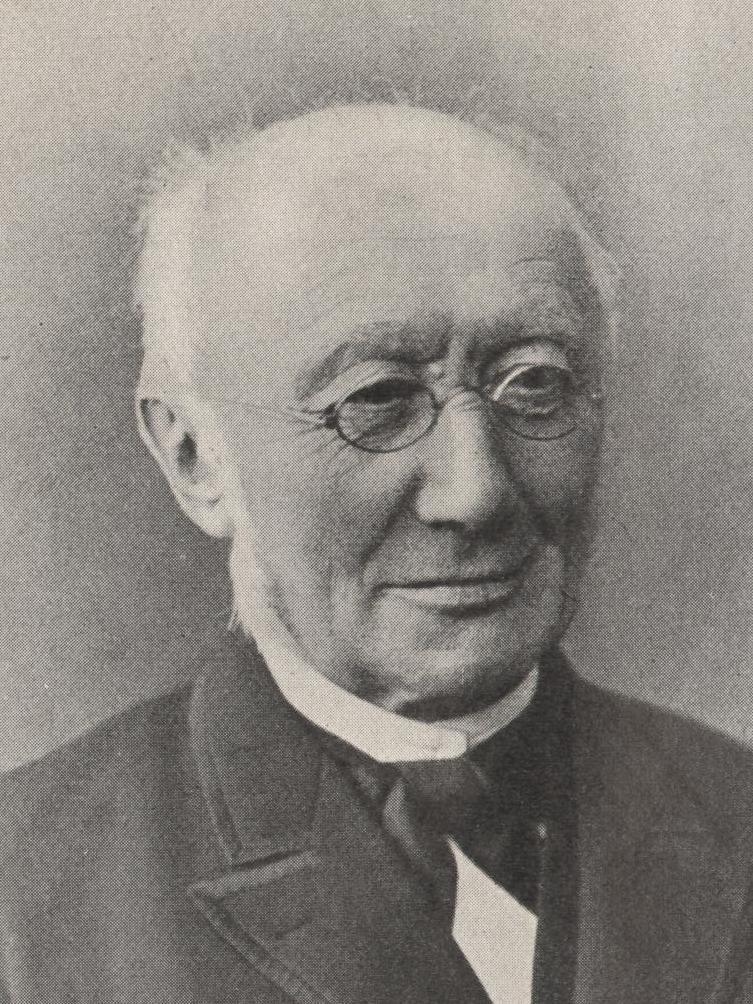

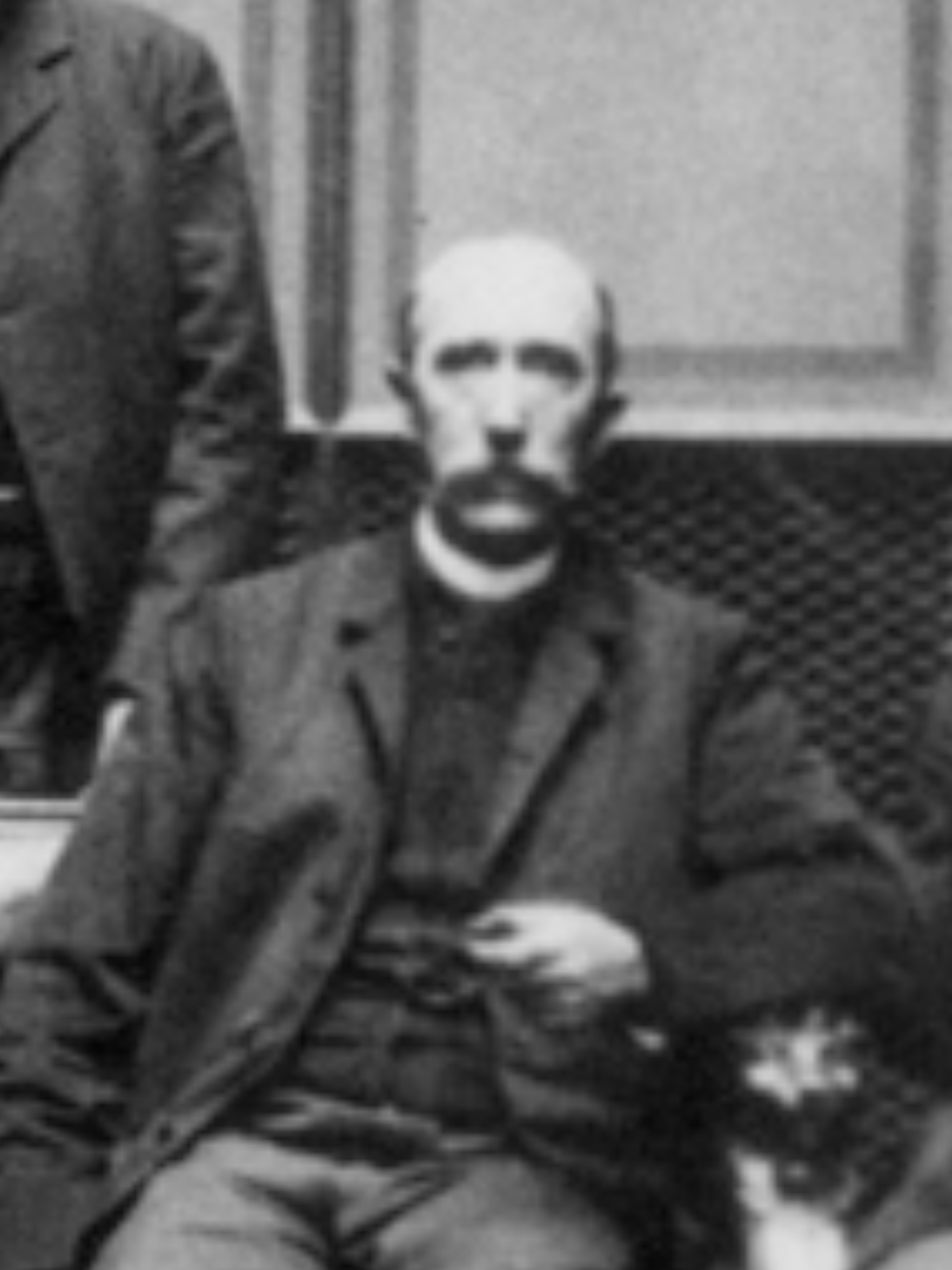

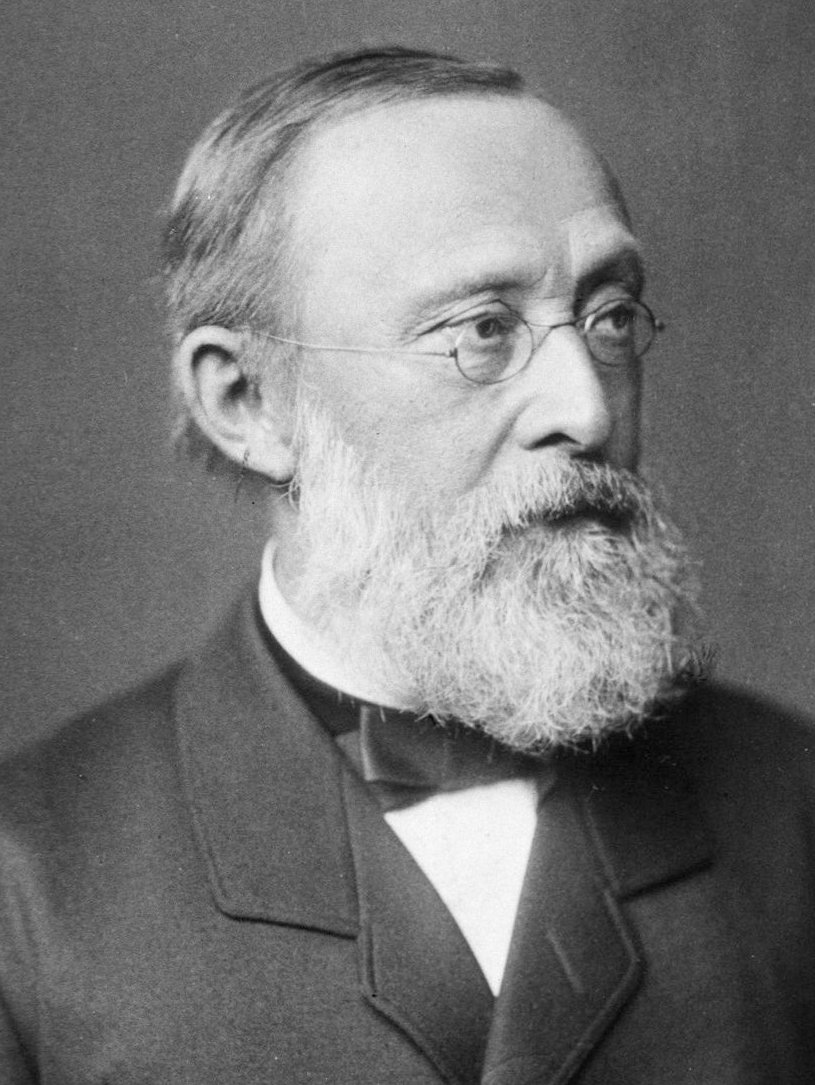

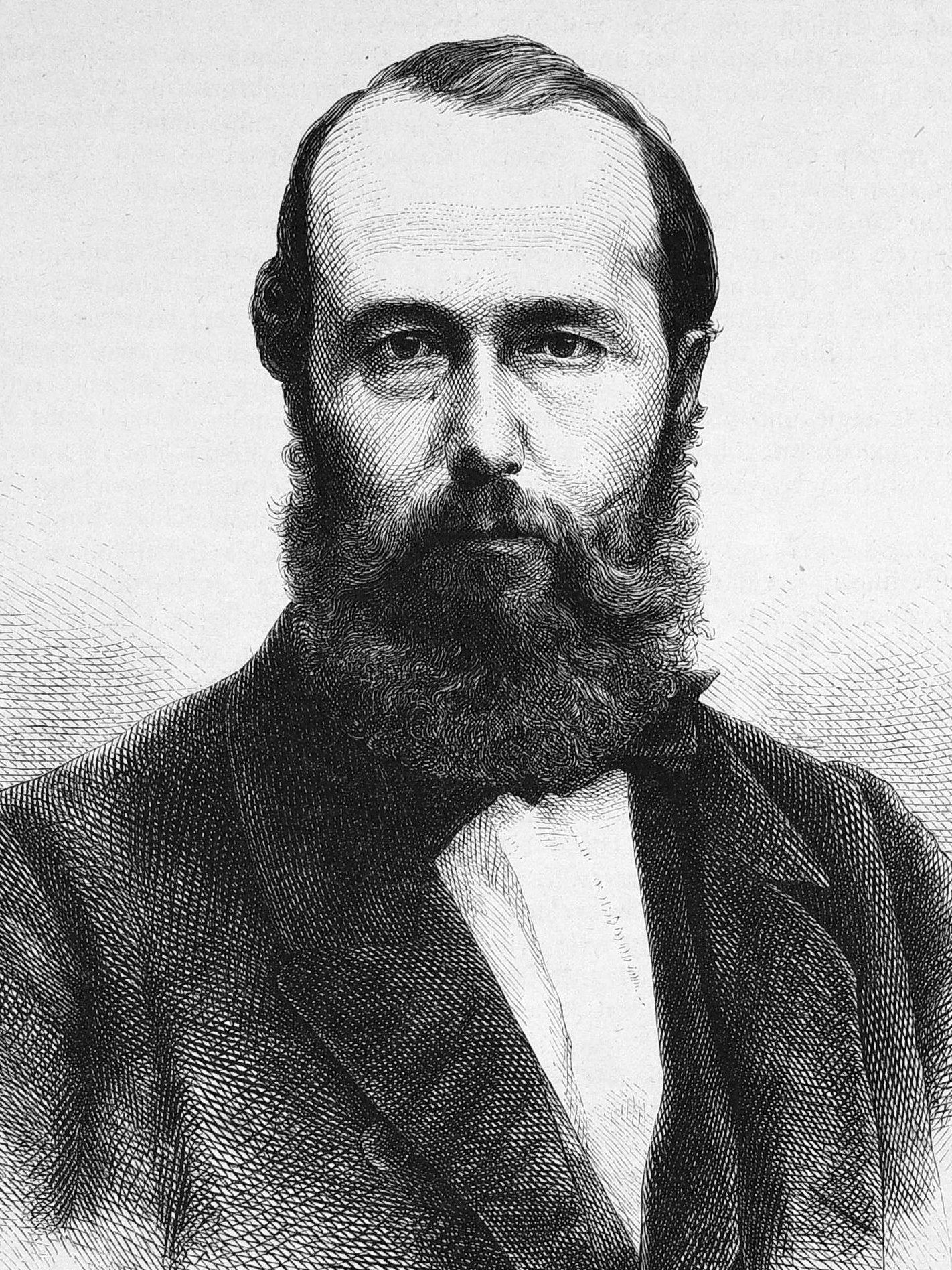

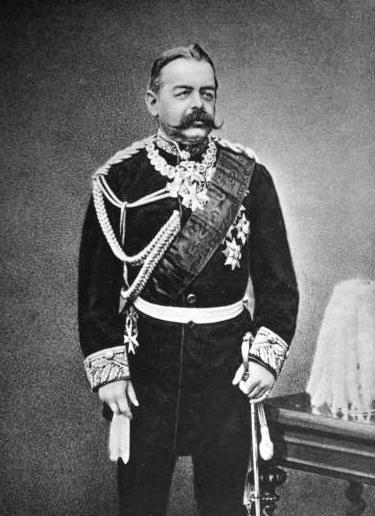
	First party	Second party	Third party
Leader	Ludwig Windthorst	Otto von Helldorff	Rudolf Virchow
Party	Centre	DKP	DFP
Last election	23.09%, 100 seats	15.23%, 50 seats	21.50%, 106 seats
Seats won	99	78	66
Seat change	▼1	▲28	▼40
Popular vote	1,275,369	858,589	978,436
Percentage	22.52%	15.16%	17.28%
Swing	▼0.57 pp	▼0.07 pp	▼4.22 pp
	Fourth party	Fifth party	Sixth party
			SPD
Leader	Rudolf von Bennigsen	Viktor I, Duke of Ratibor	Banned
Party	NlP	DRP	SPD
Last election	12.12%, 45 seats	7.50%, 27 seats	6.12%, 13 seats
Seats won	50	28	24
Seat change	▲5	▲1	▲11
Popular vote	987,355	387,637	549,990
Percentage	17.44%	6.85%	9.71%
Swing	▲5.32 pp	▼0.65 pp	▲3.59 pp
- Map of results (by constituencies)
President of the Reichstag before election
Albert von Levetzow
DKP
President of the Reichstag after election
Wilhelm von Wedell-Piesdorf
DKP

A federal election for the sixth Reichstag of the German Empire was held on 28 October 1884. It was a regularly scheduled election under the Reichstag's three-year terms of office.

The campaign centered on Germany's nascent colonial policy, which Chancellor Otto von Bismarck reluctantly backed in the hope that it would help his supporters in the conservative parties and among the National Liberals in the 1884 election. They remained well short of a majority, however, and Bismarck had to govern through temporary blocs that he pieced together.

== Campaign ==
The election campaign was dominated by Germany's emerging colonial policy, which had the cautious support of Chancellor Otto von Bismarck and was endorsed by the conservative parties (German Conservative Party and German Reich Party) and the National Liberal Party. In September 1884, Bismarck described ‘"the whole colonial business" to his vice-chancellor, the conservative Karl Heinrich von Boetticher, as "a swindle, but we need it for the elections". In a letter to the socialist theorist Eduard Bernstein, Karl Marx's collaborator Friedrich Engels commented that Bismarck had "pulled off a brilliant election coup with the colonial hoax. The philistines are falling for it mercilessly and en masse".

== Electoral system ==
The election was held under general, equal, direct and secret suffrage. All German males over the age of 25 years were able to vote except for active members of the military and recipients of poor relief. The restrictions on the military were meant to keep it from becoming politicized, while men on relief were considered to be open to political manipulation. The constitutional guarantee of a secret vote was not safeguarded at the time, since ballot boxes and polling booths were not introduced until 1903.

If no candidate in a district won an absolute majority of the votes, a runoff election was held between the first- and second-place finishers. It was possible for a replacement candidate to be introduced in a runoff.

== Results ==
Engles' evaluation, however, proved to be a miscalculation. The Conservative Party improved its totals by 82,000 votes and 28 seats, but its share of the vote dropped slightly, and it fell from second to fourth place in the Reichstag. The German Reich Party's results were essentially flat, and the National Liberals were able to pick up only five additional seats. The three parties together had 156 seats (39% of the total), which meant that the pro-government majority that Bismarck had hoped for did not materialise. The Chancellor had to continue to govern with makeshift majorities.

The German Progress Party and the Liberal Union had merged to form the German Free-minded Party in March 1884. Together with the German People's Party they won only 73 seats; in the previous Reichstag election, the left-liberal camp had had 115 members of parliament. The loss was also due to their sceptical attitude towards Germany's colonial policy.

Despite the continuing limitations on the Social Democrats' activities under the Anti-Socialist Law of 1878, the party was able to increase its number of seats from 12 to 24. The Centre Party, which lost one seat, remained the strongest party.

The imbalances caused by the failure to redraw constituency boundaries since the Reichstag election of 1871 became apparent in the 1884 election. Significant migration to cities had led to urban constituencies being underrepresented and rural areas overrepresented. The imbalance was particularly unfavourable to parties that were stronger in the cities, such as the Social Democrats and the left wing of the liberals. The liberal Free-minded Party, for example, won a total of 17.3% of the vote and 66 seats (16.6%), while the German Conservative Party with 15.2% of the vote won 78 seats (19.6%). The Social Democrats won 24 seats (6.0%) with 9.7% of the vote, while the German Reich Party won 28 seats (7.1%) with only 6.9% of the vote.

Graph of the party split among 397 seats.
Party	Votes	%	+/–	Seats	+/–
Centre Party	1,275,369	22.52	−0.57	99	−1
National Liberal Party	987,355	17.44	+5.32	50	+5
German Free-minded Party	978,436	17.28	−4.22	66	−40
German Conservative Party	858,589	15.16	−0.07	78	+28
Social Democratic Party	549,990	9.71	+3.59	24	+11
German Reich Party	387,637	6.85	−0.65	28	+1
Polish Party	209,825	3.71	−0.23	16	−2
Alsace-Lorraine parties	165,571	2.92	−0.15	15	0
German-Hanoverian Party	96,388	1.70	0.00	11	+1
German People's Party	95,891	1.69	−0.34	7	−2
Independent liberals	28,296	0.50	−1.32	2	+1
Danish Party	14,447	0.26	−0.02	1	−1
Independent conservatives	2,474	0.04	−0.34	0	0
Swabian Farmers' Association	591	0.01	New	0	New
Others	11,922	0.21	−0.19	0	0
Unknown	176	0.00	−0.01	0	0
Total	5,662,957	100.00	–	397	0
Valid votes	5,662,957	99.67			
Invalid/blank votes	18,671	0.33			
Total votes	5,681,628	100.00			
Registered voters/turnout	9,383,074	60.55			
Source: Wahlen in Deutschland

=== Alsace-Lorraine ===
Party	Votes	%	+/–	Seats	+/–
Protesters	96,119	55.65	−5.53	9	−1
Clericals	54,400	31.50	+10.52	5	+1
Autonomists	15,052	8.71	−4.70	1	0
Social Democratic Party	3,111	1.80	+1.44	0	0
German Reich Party	2,559	1.48	+0.71	0	0
Others	1,443	0.84	+0.20	0	0
Unknown	31	0.02	−0.01	0	0
Total	172,715	100.00	–	15	0
Valid votes	172,715	98.26			
Invalid/blank votes	3,066	1.74			
Total votes	175,781	100.00			
Registered voters/turnout	304,823	57.67			
Source: Wahlen in Deutschland

== Aftermath ==
The Reichstag elected in 1884 was dissolved almost a year ahead of the regular three-year schedule by an imperial order requested by Chancellor Bismarck. His seven-year military bill, which asked for a significant increase in the size of the German Army, was defeated in the Reichstag, and Bismarck hoped that a new election would provide him with the majority he wanted. The sixth Reichstag was dissolved on 14 January 1887 and the early election held on 21 February. It passed the military bill on 11 March.
