= Liberalism in Germany =

This article aims to give a historical outline of liberalism in Germany (German: Liberalismus). The liberal parties dealt with in the timeline below are, largely, those which received sufficient support at one time or another to have been represented in parliament. Not all parties so included, however, necessarily labeled themselves "liberal". The sign ⇒ denotes another party in that scheme.

== Background ==
The early high points of liberalism in Germany were the Hambach Festival (1832) and the Revolutions of 1848 in the German states.

In the Frankfurt Parliament National Assembly in the Frankfurt am Main Frankfurt Paulskirche (1848/1849), the bourgeois liberal factions Casino and Württemberger Hof (the latter led by Heinrich von Gagern) were the majority. They favored a constitutional monarchy, popular sovereignty, and parliamentary rule. Organized liberalism developed in the 1860s, combining the previous liberal and democratic currents. Between 1867 and 1933 liberalism was divided into progressive liberal and national liberal factions. Since 1945, only one liberal party has been significant in politics at the national level; the Free Democratic Party (Freie Demokratische Partei; often abbreviated as FDP).

== History ==
=== From German Progress Party to German State Party ===
- 1861: Liberals united in the German Progress Party (Deutsche Fortschrittspartei)
- 1867: The moderate faction seceded as the ⇒ National Liberal Party
- 1868: A radical South German faction seceded as the ⇒ Democratic People's Party
- 1884: The party merged with the ⇒ Liberal Union into the German Freeminded Party (Deutsche Freisinnige Partei)
- 1893: The party split in the Freeminded People's Party (Freisinnige Volkspartei) and the ⇒ Freeminded Union (Freisinnige Vereinigung)
- 1910: The FVP merged with the ⇒ Freeminded Union and the ⇒ German People's Party into the Progressive People's Party (Fortschrittliche Volkspartei)
- 1918: The party is reorganised into the German Democratic Party (Deutsche Demokratische Partei), incorporating parts of the ⇒ National Liberal Party
- 1930: The DDP in an attempt to survive reorganised itself into the German State Party (Deutsche Staatspartei)
- 1933: The party is forced to dissolve itself

=== German People's Party (1868) ===
- 1868: A radical faction of the ⇒ German Progress Party formed the German People's Party (Deutsche Volkspartei)
- 1910: The DVP merged into the ⇒ Progressive People's Party

=== National Liberal Party / German People's Party (1918) ===
National Liberals

- 1867: A right-wing faction of the ⇒ German Progress Party formed the National Liberal Party (Nationalliberale Partei)
- 1871: A conservative faction of NLP formed the Imperial Liberal Party (Liberale Reichspartei)
- 1880: A left-wing faction seceded as the ⇒ Liberal Union
- 1918: The NLP is reorganised into the German People's Party (Deutsche Volkspartei), part of the party joined the German Democratic Party
- 1933: The party is dissolved

=== Liberal Union ===
- 1880: A left-wing faction of the ⇒ National Liberal Party formed the Liberal Union (Liberale Vereinigung)
- 1884: The party merged with the ⇒ German Progress Party into the ⇒ German Freeminded Party

=== Freeminded Union ===
- 1893: The ⇒ German Freeminded Party split into the Freeminded Union (Freisinnige Vereinigung) and the ⇒ Freeminded People's Party
- 1903: The ⇒ National Social Union joined the Freeminded Union
- 1908: A left-wing faction seceded as the ⇒ Democratic Union
- 1910: The party merged into the ⇒ Progressive People's Party

=== National Social Union ===
- 1896: The National Social Union (Nationalsozialer Verein) is formed
- 1903: The party is dissolved and members joined the ⇒ Freeminded Union

=== Democratic Union ===
- 1908: A left-wing faction of the ⇒ Freeminded Union formed the Democratic Union (Demokratische Vereinigung)
- 1918: The remnants of the Union joined the German Democratic Party

=== From Liberal Democratic Party of Germany to Alliance of Free Democrats (GDR) ===
- 1945: Liberals in East Germany re-organised themselves into the Liberal Democratic Party of Germany (Liberal-Demokratische Partei Deutschlands). Since 1949 the party is under control of the communist dictatorship
- 1990: The LDPD regained its liberal profile and shortened its name in February into Liberal Democratic Party (Liberal-Demokratische Partei). The same month it joined the newly founded Free Democratic Party of the GDR (Freie Demokratische Partei der DDR) and the German Forum Party (Deutsche Forumpartei) into Association of Free Democrats (Bund Freier Demokraten). In March the Association of Free Democrats absorbed the National Democratic Party of Germany (Nationaldemokratische Partei Deutschlands), and finally in August it merged into present-day ⇒ Free Democratic Party

=== Free Democratic Party ===
- 1945–1946: Liberals in West Germany re-organised themselves in regional parties
- 1948: The regional liberal parties merged into the Free Democratic Party (Freie Demokratische Partei)
- 1956: A conservative faction seceded and formed the Free People's Party (Germany) (Freie Volkspartei). FDP is initially a hard right party well to the right of CDU
- 1982: A left-wing faction seceded as the ⇒ Liberal Democrats
- 1990: The FDP incorporated the ⇒ Association of Free Democrats
- 2013: FDP fails to reach 5% threshold, loses all representation in the Bundestag for the first time ever

=== Liberal Democrats ===
- 1982: A left-wing faction of the ⇒ Free Democratic Party formed the present-day Liberal Democrats (Liberale Demokraten), without success

=== New Liberals ===
- 2014: A left-wing faction of the ⇒ Free Democratic Party formed the present-day New Liberals (Neue Liberale), contested in Hamburg state election 2015
- 2021: The party was dissolved, formed into an association and members were urged to join Volt Germany

=== Party of Humanists ===
- 2014: The secular liberal and socially liberal, Party of Humanists (Partei der Humanisten) is formed.

== Liberal leaders ==
- Liberals before 1918: Eduard Lasker (1829–1884); Rudolf von Bennigsen – Hans Victor von Unruh – Eugen Richter
- Freisinn: Theodor Barth – Friedrich Naumann – Max Weber
- Deutsche Demokratische Partei: Walther Rathenau – Theodor Heuss
- Deutsche Volkspartei: Gustav Stresemann
- LDPD (East-Germany): Waldemar Koch, Wilhelm Külz, Manfred Gerlach
- Freie Demokratische Partei: Reinhold Maier – Thomas Dehler – Hans-Dietrich Genscher – Otto Graf Lambsdorff – Walter Scheel – Guido Westerwelle – Christian Lindner

== Liberal thinkers ==
In the Contributions to liberal theory the following German thinkers are included:

- Immanuel Kant (1724–1804)
- August Ludwig von Schlözer (1735–1809)
- Wilhelm von Humboldt (1767–1835)
- Lujo Brentano (1844–1931)
- Friedrich Naumann (1860–1919)
- Max Weber (1864–1920)
- Walther Rathenau (1867–1922)
- Adolf von Harnack (1851–1930)
- Wilhelm Röpke (1899–1966)
- Ralf Dahrendorf (1929–2009)
- Karl-Hermann Flach (1929–1973)

== See also ==
- History of Germany
- Politics of Germany
- List of political parties in Germany
- Weber and German politics
