= Moritz Klotz =

- Born: 6 August 1813; Potsdam, Prussia
- Died: 11 August 1892; Berlin, Germany
- Occupation: Liberal politician

Moritz Klotz (6 August 1813 – 11 August 1892) was a Berlin judge who became a politician in Prussia and, after 1871, in Germany.

His unusually long political career provides a line of continuity between the idealistic liberalisms of 1848 and the political liberalism that manifested itself in Germany after unification.

"Nothing is more shameful than if an entire class of people face persecution in a state where each individual is constitutionally entitled to follow his or her own beliefs."

"Nichts ist schmachvoller, als wenn in einem Staate, wo Jeder verfassungsmäßig treiben und glauben darf, was er will, eine ganze Klasse der Bevölkerung um ihres Glaubens willen verfolgt wird."

Moritz Klotz in an 1881 election address

== Life ==
Klotz was born into a Protestant family in Potsdam during the closing years of the Napoleonic Wars. He attended secondary school (Gymnasium) in Potsdam and then went on to study jurisprudence at the university in nearby Berlin between 1831 and 1834. He was articled in 1836, and in 1840 he had was appointed a junior judge (Kammergerichtsassessor) in the second Berlin district court, later becoming a Special Commissioner with the Berlin General Commission.

In 1848 Moritz Klotz was one of the members of the short-lived Prussian National Assembly in Berlin. Following the end of the reactionary period that ensued, in 1860 he became a member of the Prussian House of Representatives till 1866, and then again between 1869 and his death in 1892. Between 1877 and 1879 he served as the first vice-president of the parliament.

Initially he was a member of the faction headed up by Georg von Vincke, which subsequently came to be identified as the "Old Liberal" (Altliberale) grouping. Moritz himself later joined the Progressive Party, founded in 1861, then switching in the 1880s to the short-lived Free-minded Party (Deutsche Freisinnige Partei).

Between 1871 and 1884, and then again between 1886 and 1890, he also served as a member of the National Reichstag.
