= Free-minded People's Party (Germany) =

German political party (1893–1910)

Free-minded People's Party Freisinnige Volkspartei
- Leader: Eugen Richter
- Founded: 7 May 1893; 132 years ago
- Dissolved: 6 March 1910; 115 years ago
- Preceded by: German Free-minded Party
- Merged into: Progressive People's Party
- Ideology: Liberalism (German); Radicalism
- Political position: Centre-left to left-wing
- Colours: Yellow

The Free-minded People's Party (German: Freisinnige Volkspartei, FVP) or, more rarely translated as the Radical People's Party, was a social liberal party in the German Empire founded in 1893 as a result of the split of the German Free-minded Party. Dominated by Eugen Richter, who was party leader from 1893 until his death in 1906, the left-liberal FVP advocated parliamentarism, free trade and legal recognition of trade unions. It was generally critical of the government and in opposition to it.

The FVP was disbanded in 1910 after the Free-minded Union and German People's Party joined with it to form the Progressive People's Party.

== Formation ==
The German Free-minded Party (DFP), the party that split to create the Free-minded People's Party, was formed in 1884 by a merger of the German Progress Party and the Liberal Union. From the beginning there had been tensions between the left wing of the Progress Party and the right wing of the Liberal Union. They came to a head on 6 May 1893 when Karl Schrader and five other former Liberal Union members voted in favour of an army bill proposed by Chancellor Leo von Caprivi, while the majority of the DFP's members voted against it. Eugen Richter, the DFP's parliamentary leader, called for the six dissidents to be expelled from the DFP Reichstag contingent. Although the motion met with fierce opposition, it was ultimately adopted 27 to 22. A few days later, other former members of the Liberal Union including Ludwig Bamberger, Theodor Barth and Heinrich Rickert, together with a group of former Progress Party members led by Albert Hänel, resigned from the party and joined the other expellees to form the Free-minded Union. The remaining left wing of the DFP centred around Richter then formed the Free-minded People's Party (FVP), and the DFP was disbanded. The FVP was the larger of the two new liberal parties, and most of the DFP's local associations joined it.

== Structure ==
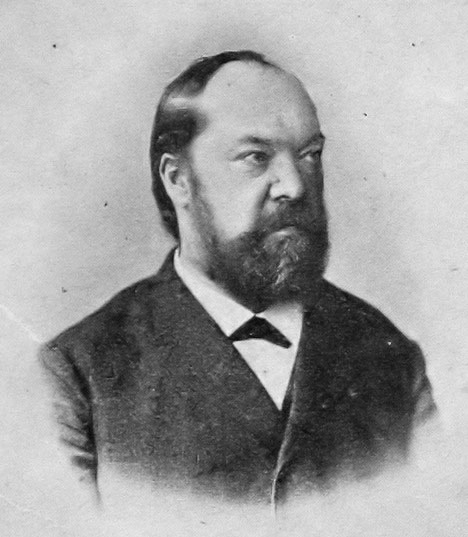
Eugen Richter, who headed the Free-minded People's Party from 1893 to 1906

Eugen Richter was the party's leading figure and its chairman from 1893 until his death in 1906. Officially the party was a democracy, but in practice Richter's opinion was decisive in matters of both policy and personnel. The party conferences and party executive (known as the party committee) had little influence of their own.

In 1895/96, the party had 379 local organisations. It was strongest in Saxony, Prussia (especially in Berlin, Silesia and East Prussia) and in the city-states and small cities of northern and central Germany. Although the party was largely able to maintain the support base it had inherited from its predecessor, it had little success in reaching new sections of society. Its voters and members came mainly from the petty bourgeoisie and middle classes in trade and industry. There were also some liberal large-scale farmers and landowners, as well as members of the educated bourgeoisie.

The FVP worked with the German People's Party and published a joint election appeal with it for the first time in the 1893 Reichstag election, when the FVP won 24 seats. In the following elections, the totals were 29 seats in 1898, 21 in 1903 and 28 in 1907.

== Program ==
In 1894 the Free-minded People's Party adopted a party program which called for the introduction of the relatively liberal Reichstag electoral law in the Empire's individual states, a fairer division of electoral districts, the parliamentarisation the Empire, salaries for members of parliament and annual (instead of seven-year) military budgets. The FVP consistently opposed higher military spending and Initially was critical of German colonial policy and the expansion of the naval fleet.

In economic policy, the party supported limited state intervention, free trade on the lines of Manchester Liberalism, the promotion of self-help institutions and the abolition of the privileges of large landowners. It also called for the legal recognition of trade unions.

Given the FVP's small size, it could not implement its party program without cooperating with the Social Democratic Party (SPD) and the left wing of the Catholic Centre Party, but Richter opposed working with them. Historian Thomas Nipperdey stated that the FVP stagnated into doctrinaire opposition during Richter's lifetime.

== After the Richter era ==
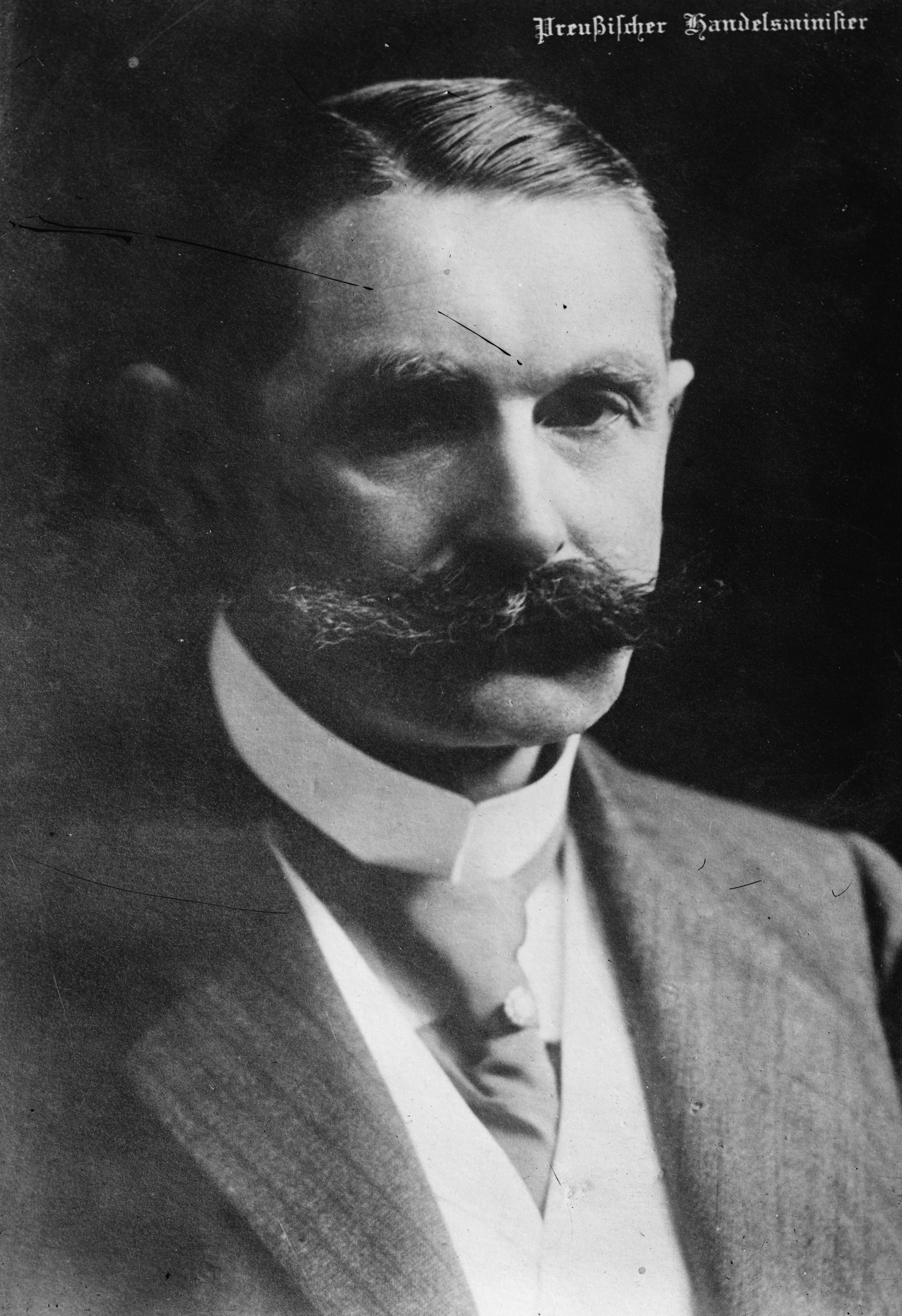
Otto Fischbeck, the FVP's last party leader

Hermann Müller-Sagan succeeded Richter after his death in 1906, but he was quite weak. Otto Fischbeck, a stronger voice in the FVP, was later named its chairman. After Richter's death, the party committees had more influence, and there was a change in its politics. The party agreed with the government's naval expansion bill and its colonial policy, due in large part to the strong support for it among the educated bourgeoisie. The FVP also became part of the Bülow bloc, an electoral alliance formed by Chancellor Bernhard von Bülow after the Reichstag, led by the SPD and Centre Party, rejected his supplemental budget bill to fund the Herero Wars in German South West Africa.

At around the same time, a minority of the FVP began to call for a merger with the Free-minded Union. They were later joined by the majority of the Reichstag party contingent and an increasing number of local associations. The two parties cooperated for the first time during the 1907 Reichstag election. On 6 March 1910, the left-liberal Free-minded Union and German People's Party joined with the Free-minded People's Party to form the Progressive People's Party.

== See also ==
- Contributions to liberal theory
- Liberal democracy
- Liberalism
- Liberalism in Germany
- Liberalism worldwide
- List of liberal parties

Preceded by German Free-minded Party	liberal German parties 1893-1910	Succeeded by Progressive People's Party (Germany)
