= Liberal Union (Germany) =

Liberal Union Liberale Vereinigung
- Leader: Eduard Lasker
- Founded: 1880; 146 years ago
- Dissolved: 1884; 142 years ago
- Split from: National Liberal Party
- Merged into: German Free-minded Party
- Ideology: Liberalism (German); Parliamentarism; Economic liberalism
- Political position: Centre-left (Note: Liberal Union was a position between the centrist National Liberal Party and the left-wing German Progress Party. Also, the party sat left of centrist National Liberal Party and Zentrum in Reichstag.)
- Colours: Yellow

The Liberal Union (German: Liberale Vereinigung) was a short-lived liberal party in the German Empire. It originated in 1880 as a breakaway from the National Liberal Party and so was also called the Secession. It merged with the left liberal German Progress Party to form the German Free-minded Party (German: Deutsche Freisinnige Partei, DFP) in 1884.

The leftist faction of the National Liberal Party expressed discontent with the party leadership's support for Otto von Bismarck's conservative government. Most importantly, they supported free trade whereas National Liberal leaders Rudolf von Bennigsen and Johann von Miquel sustained Bismarck's protective tariffs policies (Schutzzollpolitik). Other contentious points included the Anti-Socialist Laws (Sozialistengesetze), the Kulturkampf against the Catholic Church and the septennial military budget (Septennat).

Eduard Lasker led the Secession. Other notable members included Ludwig Bamberger, Berlin Mayor Max von Forckenbeck, historian and future Nobel laureate Theodor Mommsen, Friedrich Kapp, Theodor Barth, Heinrich Edwin Rickert and Georg von Siemens. The Liberal Union was a notables' party (Honoratiorenpartei), having its electorate mainly amongst the North and East German upper classes, wholesale merchants and intellectuals. The organisational structure was rather loose. Nevertheless, the new grouping was initially successful, gaining 46 seats of the Reichstag in the 1881 federal election—as many as the preceding National liberals.

Ultimately, the Secessionists planned to merge all German liberals into a single whole liberal party, hence the name Liberal Union, with liberal and parliamentary monarchist positions, modelled after the British Liberal Party and ideally to govern under a future Emperor Frederick III. However, the National Liberals made clear they would not leave the majority loyal to Bismarck, therefore Secessionist representative Franz von Stauffenberg negotiated with Eugen Richter, the leader of the left liberal German Progress Party in early 1884. As early as in March 1884, both parties' legislators formed a joint parliamentary group with together 100 seats. Timely to the federal election in October, the German Free-minded Party was formed. Subsequently, the parliamentary representation diminished to only 64 members of the Reichstag.

== See also ==
- Contributions to liberal theory
- Liberal democracy
- Liberalism worldwide
- List of liberal parties

== Footnotes ==
Preceded by National Liberal Party (Germany)	liberal German parties 1880-1884	Succeeded by German Free-minded Party
