= 1881 German federal election =

- 27 October 1881

All 397 seats in the Reichstag 199 seats needed for a majority
- Registered: 9,090,386
- Turnout: 56.30% (▼6.03pp)
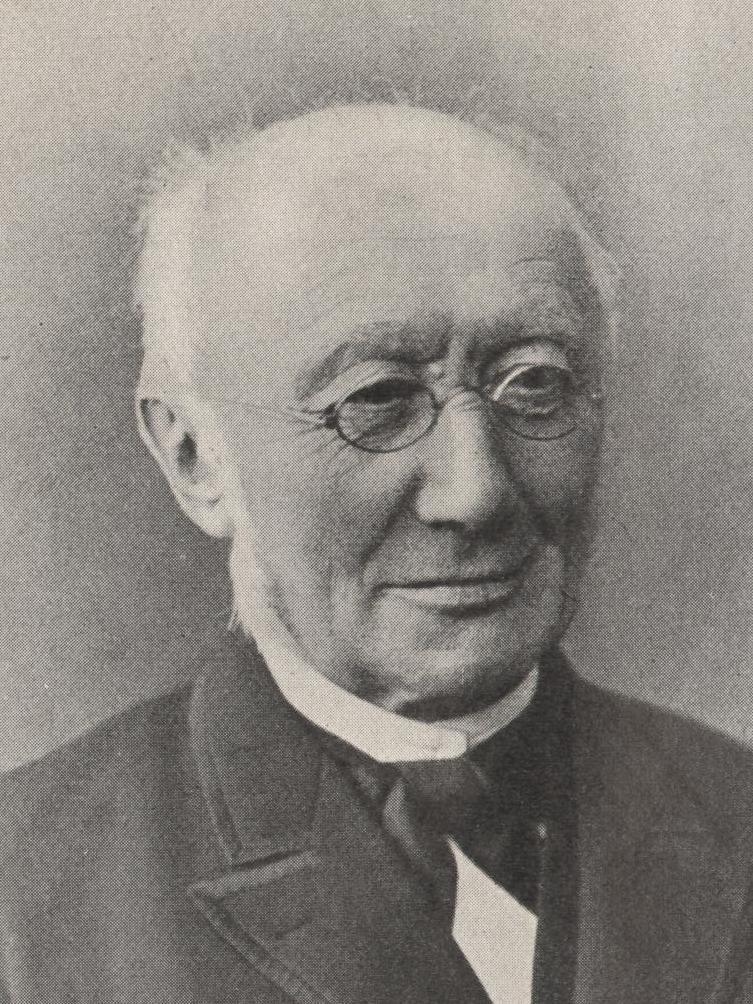

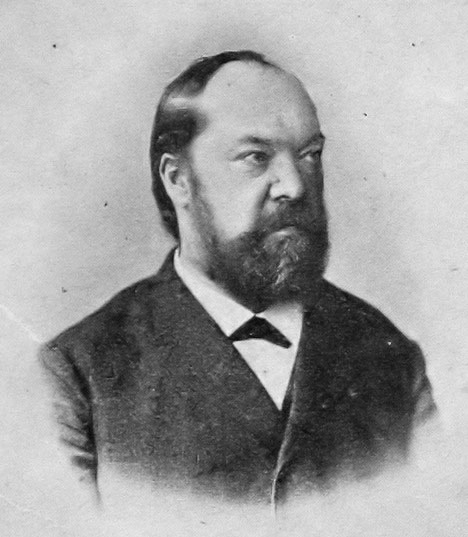

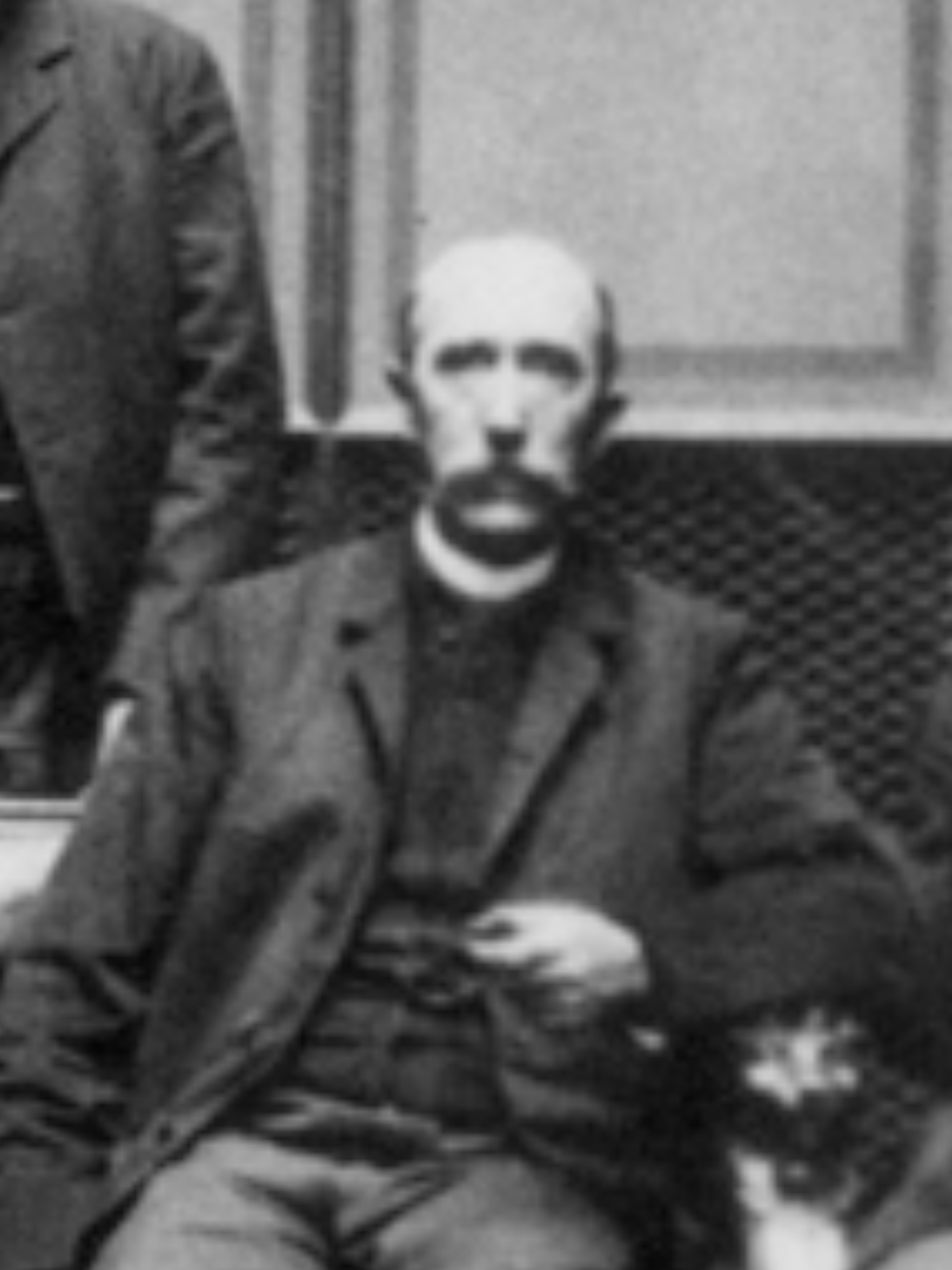

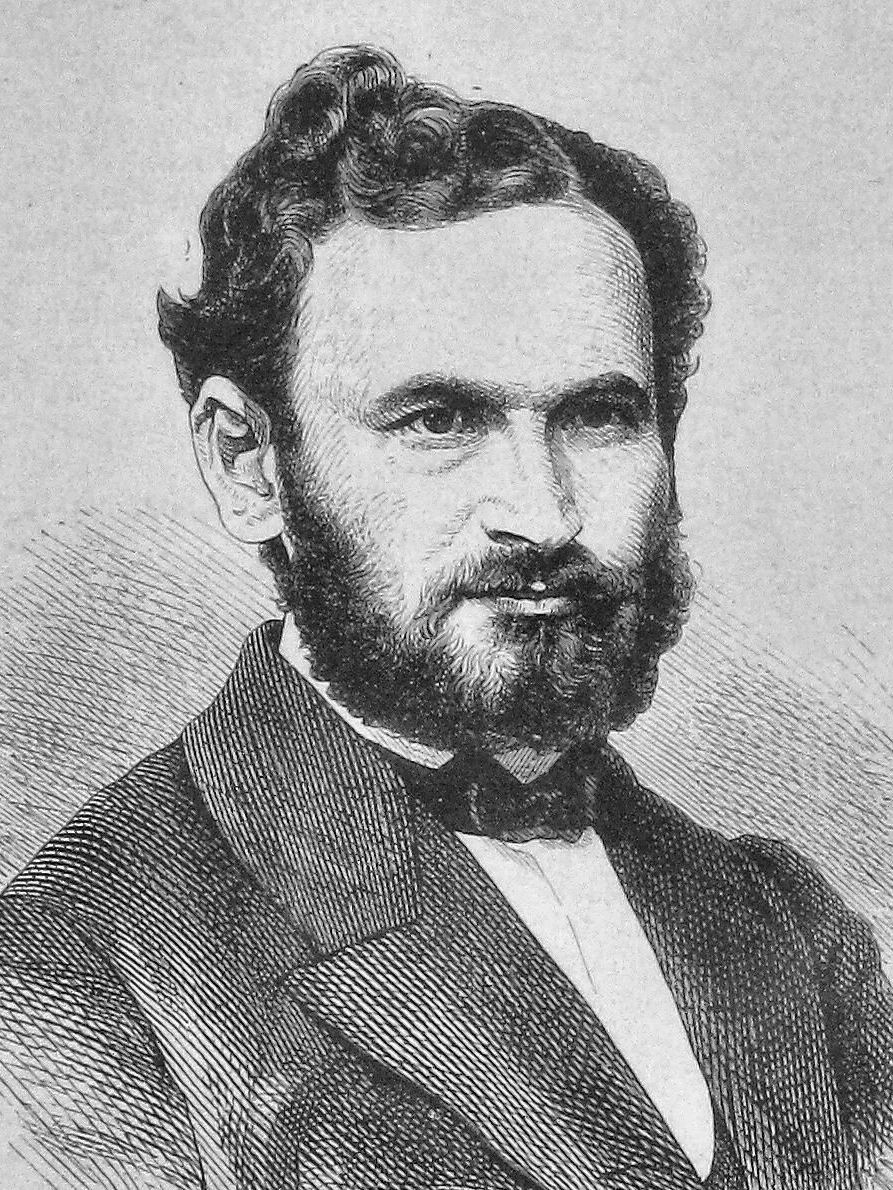

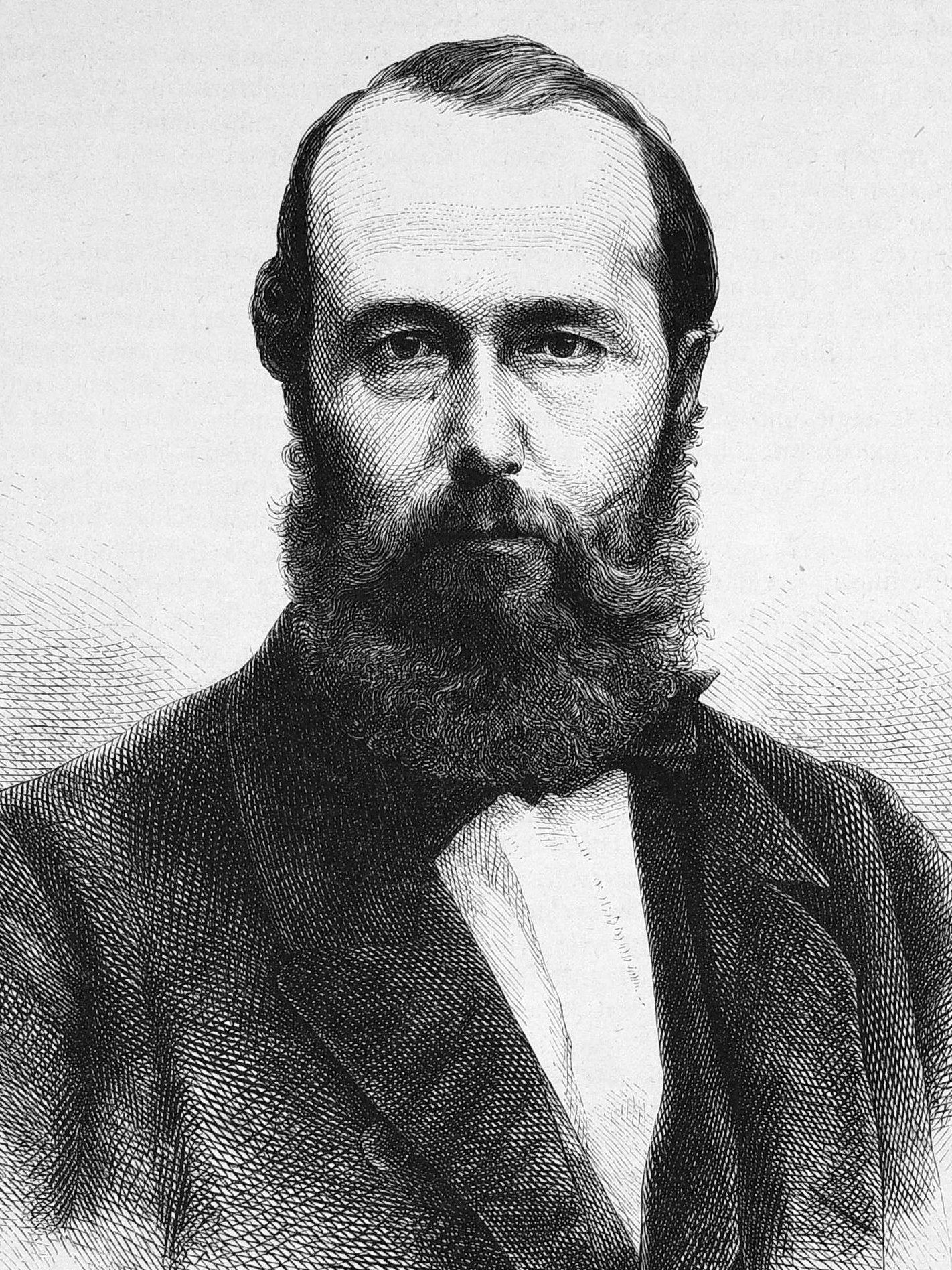

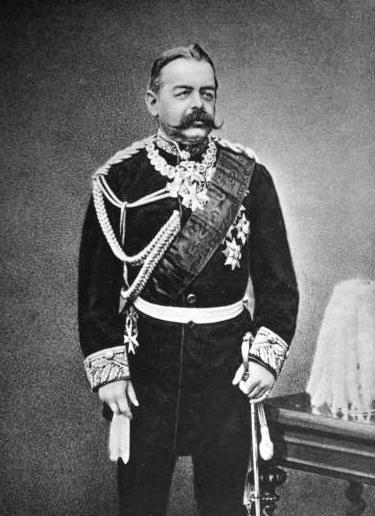
	First party	Second party	Third party
Leader	Ludwig Windthorst	Eugen Richter	Otto von Helldorff
Party	Centre	DFP	DKP
Leader since	26 May 1874		7 June 1876
Last election	22.84%, 94 seats	6.86%, 26 seats	12.79%, 59 seats
Seats won	100	58	50
Seat change	▲6	▲32	▼9
Popular vote	1,177,033	645,851	776,436
Percentage	23.09%	12.67%	15.23%
Swing	▲0.25 pp	▲5.81 pp	▲2.44 pp
	Fourth party	Fifth party	Sixth party
Leader	Eduard Lasker	Rudolf von Bennigsen	Viktor I, Duke of Ratibor
Party	LV	NlP	DRP
Leader since	1877	1867
Last election	Did not exist	22.41%, 97 seats	13.64%, 57 seats
Seats won	48	45	27
Seat change	New party	▼52	▼30
Popular vote	450,166	617,752	382,149
Percentage	8.83%	12.12%	7.50%
Swing	New party	▼10.29 pp	▼6.14 pp
- Map of results (by constituencies)
President of the Reichstag before election
Gustav von Goßler
DKP
President of the Reichstag after election
Albert von Levetzow
DKP

A federal election for the fifth Reichstag of the German Empire was held on 27 October 1881. It was a regularly scheduled election under the Reichstag's three-year terms of office.

The dominant issues were protective tariffs and the government's requests for increased taxes. The conservative parties, which supported the government, lost seats, leaving the Reichstag without options for a stable majority. As a result, Chancellor Otto von Bismarck was unable to realize many of his plans in the new parliament.

== Historical background ==
Taxes and tariffs were the dominant issue in the 1881 election. Increasing competition from abroad had led to the passage of protective tariffs on agricultural and industrial goods in 1879. The Catholic Centre Party, German Conservative Party and 27 out of 97 members of the National Liberal Party voted for the tariff bill, while the Social Democratic Party (SPD) and the remainder of the National Liberals opposed it. The differences of opinion within the National Liberal Party led to a group of members from its left wing splitting off and forming the Liberal Union in 1880.

In spite of the income from tariffs, the government needed additional revenue to cover its expenses. In the autumn of 1880, the Reichstag approved a seven-year budget for the military, but a majority resisted the additional tax increases that the government later requested. Chancellor Otto von Bismarck hoped that the election of 1881 would improve the chances of passing his tax package.

== Electoral system ==
The election was held under general, equal, direct and secret suffrage. All German males over the age of 25 years were able to vote except for active members of the military and recipients of poor relief. The restrictions on the military were meant to keep it from becoming politicized, while men on relief were considered to be open to political manipulation. The constitutional guarantee of a secret vote was not safeguarded at the time, since ballot boxes and polling booths were not introduced until 1903.

If no candidate in a district won an absolute majority of the votes, a runoff election was held between the first- and second-place finishers. It was possible for a replacement candidate to be introduced in a runoff.

== Results ==
The parties that Bismarck generally relied on for votes lost seats in the election. The Centre, Conservatives and German Reich Party (Free Conservatives) together had 177 seats, down 33 from the previous election and well short of the 199 needed for a majority. Opposite the conservative grouping stood the Liberal Union and German Progress Party with 106 seats. They and the National Liberal Party with its 45 seats formed a Kartell with the aim of coming to a mutual understanding before critical votes.

The share of the vote going to the Social Democratic Party (officially still named the Socialist Workers' Party) dropped by just 1.5% despite the harsh restrictions placed on it by the Anti-Socialist Law in 1878. The number of seats it won in the Reichstag actually rose, from 9 to 13.

Graph of the party split among 397 seats.
Party	Votes	%	+/–	Seats	+/–
Centre Party	1,177,033	23.09	+0.25	100	+6
German Conservative Party	776,436	15.23	+2.44	50	−9
German Progress Party	645,851	12.67	+5.81	58	+32
National Liberal Party	617,752	12.12	−10.29	45	−52
Liberal Union	450,166	8.83	New	48	New
German Reich Party	382,149	7.50	−6.14	27	−30
Social Democratic Party	311,961	6.12	−1.47	13	+4
Polish Party	200,734	3.94	+0.19	18	+4
Alsace-Lorraine parties	156,707	3.07	−0.04	15	0
German People's Party	103,665	2.03	+0.83	9	+6
Independent liberals	92,539	1.82	+0.09	1	−6
German-Hanoverian Party	86,704	1.70	−0.15	10	0
Schauss-Völk group	22,238	0.44	New	1	New
Independent conservatives	19,517	0.38	+0.21	0	0
Christian Social Party	17,628	0.35	+0.29	0	0
Danish Party	14,398	0.28	0.00	2	+1
Independent anti-semites	7,255	0.14	New	0	New
Others	14,359	0.28	+0.10	0	0
Unknown	668	0.01	0.00	0	0
Total	5,097,760	100.00	–	397	0
Valid votes	5,097,760	99.60			
Invalid/blank votes	20,572	0.40			
Total votes	5,118,332	100.00			
Registered voters/turnout	9,090,386	56.30			
Source: Wahlen in Deutschland

=== Alsace-Lorraine ===
Party	Votes	%	+/–	Seats	+/–
Protesters	100,321	61.18	+26.66	10	+4
Clericals	34,396	20.98	−8.38	4	−1
Autonomists	21,990	13.41	−10.28	1	−3
National Liberal Party	3,186	1.94	New	0	New
German Reich Party	1,265	0.77	−11.19	0	0
German Conservative Party	872	0.53	+0.36	0	0
Social Democratic Party	583	0.36	+0.29	0	0
Independent liberals	255	0.16	New	0	New
Others	1,057	0.64	+0.41	0	0
Unknown	51	0.03	+0.03	0	0
Total	163,976	100.00	–	15	0
Valid votes	163,976	97.26			
Invalid/blank votes	4,618	2.74			
Total votes	168,594	100.00			
Registered voters/turnout	311,001	54.21			
Source: Wahlen in Deutschland

== Aftermath ==
Because he lacked a majority in the Reichstag, Bismarck's only choices were to try to put together temporary blocs that would support him or to rule without parliament. His attempts to do the latter ran into opposition from both his advisors and the Reichstag, which refused to grant him the necessary funds. As a result, many of Bismarck's post-election reform plans had to be shelved.

Emperor Wilhelm I was so unhappy about how little the SPD's share of the vote had decreased that he sent a note to the Reichstag saying that the government would hold to its tax and tariff policies even against the Reichstag's opposition. He also issued a decree to public officials requiring them to advocate the government's positions.

Bismarck came to realize that he needed to change course and try to win over the socialists. In November 1881, he announced a bill to provide workers with insurance against accident, illness, disability and old age. The corresponding laws began to go into effect in 1883. The Anti-Socialist Law remained in effect until 1890.
