= Democratic Union (Germany) =

German political party in the German Empire

The Democratic Union (German: Demokratische Vereinigung, DV) was a German political party in the German Empire.

The Union was founded in 1908 by former members of the Freeminded Union (Freisinnigen Vereinigung). The party demanded full equal voting rights for all, and a strict separation of church and state. It was not principled, or "revolutionary" against Wilhelmine Germany though.

Important party members were Theodor Barth, Rudolf Breitscheid (first chairman) and Hellmut von Gerlach. Carl von Ossietzky joined the party in 1908, and from 1911 onwards published the party's weekly Das freie Volk.

The First World War brought an end to the party. Hellmut von Gerlach, and some of his followers, helped found the German Democratic Party in 1918.

== See also ==
- Liberalism in Germany
