= Progressive People's Party (Germany) =

Political party of the German Empire

Progressive People's Party Fortschrittliche Volkspartei
- Chairman: Otto Fischbeck (1910–1912); Otto Wiemer (1912–1918)
- Founded: 6 March 1910; 116 years ago
- Dissolved: 20 November 1918; 107 years ago
- Preceded by: Free-minded People's Party; Free-minded Union; German People's Party
- Succeeded by: German Democratic Party
- Membership: 120,000 (1912)
- Ideology: Liberalism (German); Social liberalism Radicalism
- Political position: Centre-left
- Colours: Yellow

The Progressive People's Party (German: Fortschrittliche Volkspartei, FVP) was a social liberal party in the German Empire. It was formed on 6 March 1910 from the merger of the Free-minded People's Party, the Free-minded Union and the German People's Party. The FVP advocated the parliamentarisation of the Empire and socio-political changes such as universal suffrage and the right to form and join trade unions. Its membership was largely middle class, including merchants, mid-level civil servants, salaried employees and academics. It occasionally cooperated with the Social Democratic Party before World War I. Although initially in favour of a wartime policy of annexations, it later supported the 1917 Reichstag Peace Resolution and the constitutional reforms of October 1918. After the war, the FVP joined with the left wing of the National Liberal Party to form the German Democratic Party of the Weimar Republic.

== Background ==
At the beginning of the 20th century, the Free-minded People's Party (Freisinnige Volkspartei, also FVP), the Free-minded Union (Freisinnige Vereinigung, FVG) and the German People's Party (Deutsche Volkspartei, DtVP) together represented a range of left-liberal viewpoints. Efforts to overcome the fragmentation began in 1903 when an electoral alliance was formed between the FVP and the DtVP. Before the 1907 Reichstag election, the two free-minded parties joined the Bülow bloc, an electoral alliance formed by Chancellor Bernhard von Bülow after the Reichstag, led by the Social Democratic Party (SPD) and Centre Party, rejected his supplemental budget bill to fund the Herero Wars in German South West Africa. The bloc was made up of Conservatives, National Liberals and the left-liberal parties. Because of the FVG's cooperation with the conservatives in the Bülow bloc, Theodor Barth and his supporters split away from the party in the spring of 1908 and formed the Democratic Union (Demokratische Vereinigung, DV). In the 1907 Reichstag, the three left-liberal parties united in a parliamentary caucus, and in 1910 they merged to become the Progressive People's Party.

== Party program ==
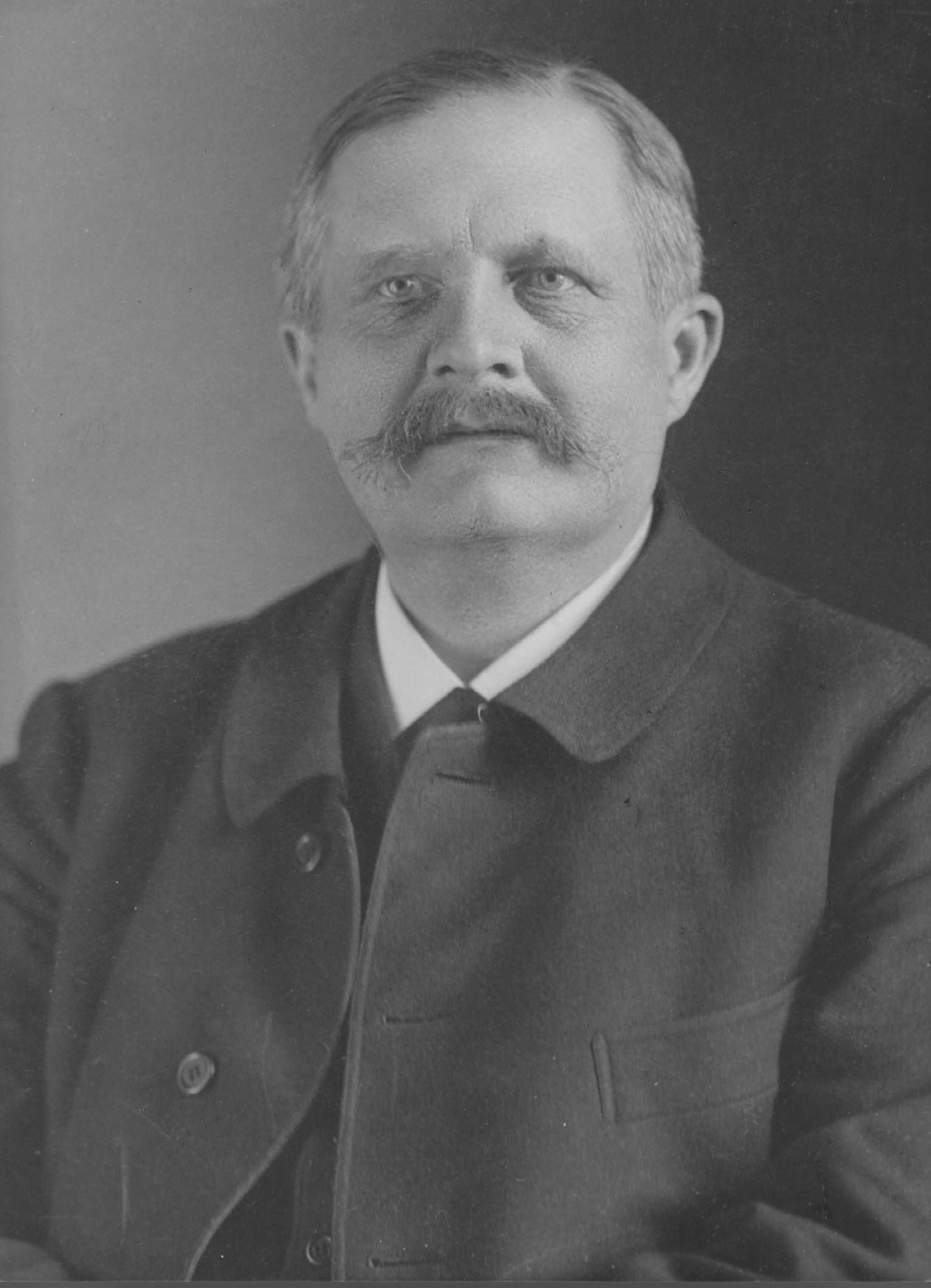
Friedrich Naumann, a Protestant pastor who was a key voice in the FVP

The party program of the Progressive People's Party centred on increasing the influence of the middle class and expanding political freedom. It called for equal, direct and universal suffrage in both the Reich and its individual states and for the abolition of the three-class voting system used in Prussia, which weighted votes based on the amount of taxes paid and consequently diluted the strength of middle- and working-class votes. The party also sought a fair division of electoral districts, which had become heavily unbalanced in favour of rural regions due to the lack of reapportionments during a period when urban industrial centres were growing rapidly. The Progressives furthermore supported a consistent separation of church and state and a modification of the Reich constitution that would make the Empire a parliamentary monarchy.

Economically and socially, the party advocated a gradual reduction of food and industrial tariffs; progressive taxation of Income, wealth and inheritance; the safeguarding and expansion of the right of workers to form and join trade unions; the improvement of occupational safety; and the introduction of measures to protect the unemployed. The national and state parliaments and governments were to be encouraged to work with self-help organizations to improve the economic and social situation of wage and salary earners. At the international level, the party stood for peaceful conciliation by developing international law and international courts of arbitration.

The party's liberal economics represented the interests of the export industry, trade, banks, crafts and commerce. Overall the orientation was towards a welfare state rather than Manchester liberalism. The party wanted to raise the general welfare and promote social progress and public education. The scope of its goals was substantial for a party of the German Empire.

Historian Dieter Langewiesche wrote that the party program showed the momentum of a newly invigorated left-wing liberalism. He saw it as particularly evident in social policy. Self-help, no longer a matter of political dogma, was accompanied by demands for state intervention. The party did not, however, advocate equal rights for women extending beyond the right to vote. Friedrich Naumann called for it but was not able to make it part of the FVP's program.

== Organisation ==
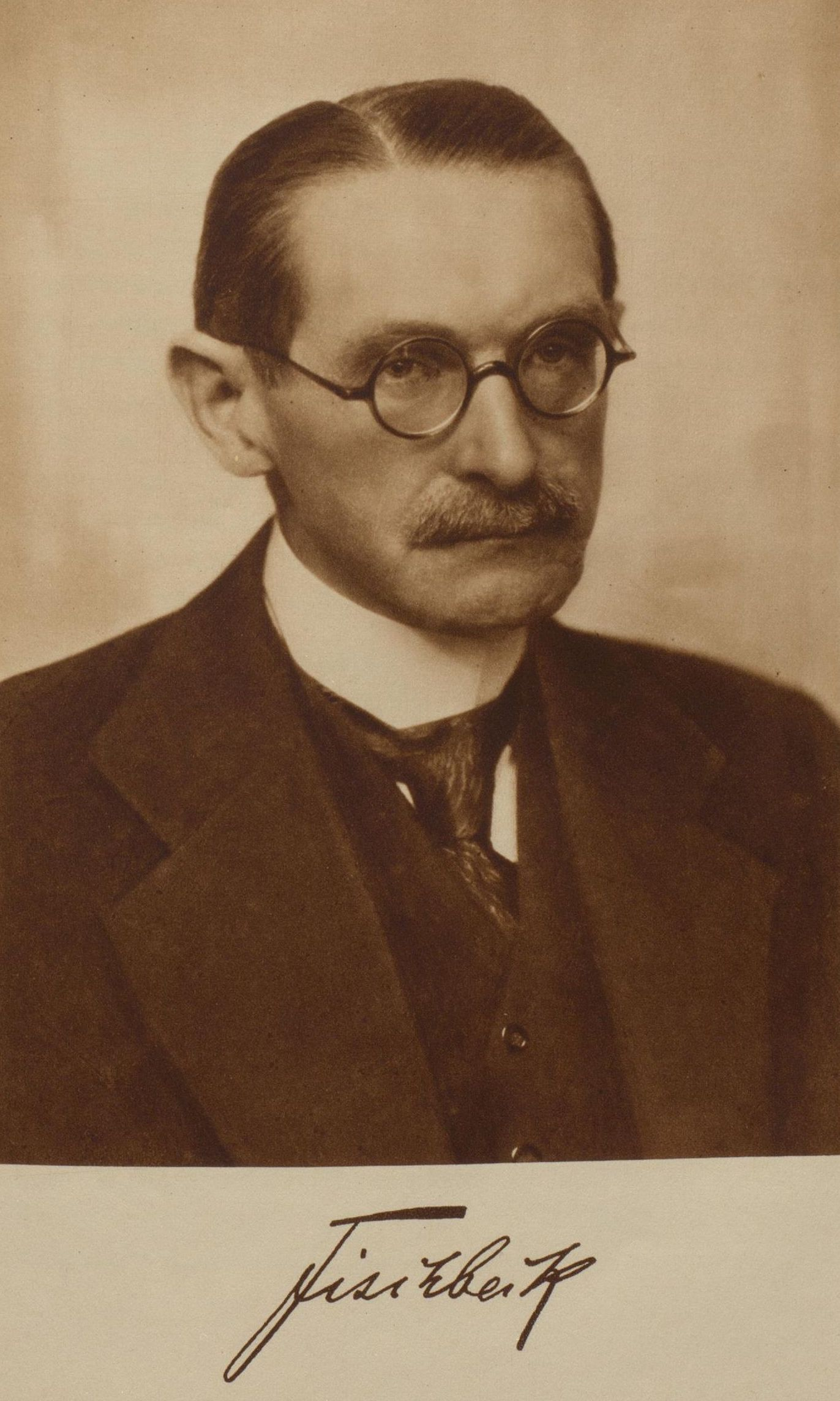
Otto Fischbeck, the first chairman of the FVP

The party was tightly organised. At the top was a central committee which included the FVP Reichstag members and the executive committee, sixty representatives of the regional associations, and a few appointees. Political questions were decided by the Reichstag party members and organisational matters by the executive committee. The financial situation of the party was often difficult because of late or skipped dues payments.

In 1912 the party had around 1,452 local branches with a total of some 120,000 members. They came mainly from the lower and middle levels of the bourgeoisie. Tradespeople, merchants, mid-level civil servants, salaried employees and academics were among the groups most strongly represented. The number of primary school teachers and Protestant pastors was also relatively high. In some areas, such as Oldenburg and the Province of Schleswig-Holstein, the party had supporters among farmers, but it had relatively little success with lower-level employees and workers. It tried to increase its share of workers by encouraging the founding of liberal workers' associations, but by 1914 they had achieved a membership of just 5,000.

There were a number of unaffiliated associations which exerted influence on the party. They included the Commercial Treaty Association, in which merchants and entrepreneurs had joined forces to promote free trade. Other associations included the Hansa Federation for Trade, Commerce and Industry; liberal farmers‘ and agricultural workers’ organizations; the General German Teachers‘ Association; the Hirsch-Duncker trade unions with around 100,000 members; and, to some extent, Protestant workers’ associations.

== Politics ==
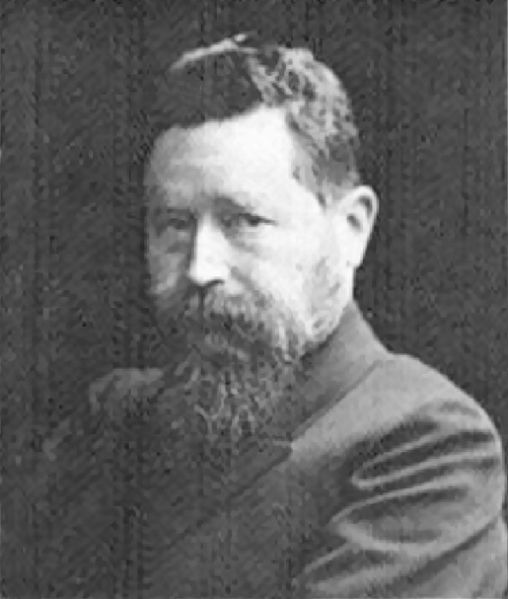
Friedrich von Payer, vice chancellor of Germany from November 1917 to November 1918

Due to its left-wing liberal positions, the party was mostly in opposition to the government's domestic, economic and fiscal policies. The FVP's main opponents in the Reichstag were the German Conservative Party and, in the early years, the Catholic Centre Party.

A key question for the liberal parties in the Reichstag was whether to work with the Social Democrats (SPD). Friedrich Naumann coined a slogan urging a ‘bloc from Bassermann to Bebel’, referring to Ernst Bassermann, the chairman of the National Liberal Party and his SPD counterpart August Bebel. Naumann's idea was supported by the Hansa Federation, which wanted to create a reform bloc separate from the conservative-agrarian interests, but it caused considerable controversy in the Progressive Party. Its chairman Otto Fischbeck spoke of a ‘grand bloc utopia’ at the Reich level. Bassermann and Bebel also opposed it.

The left-liberal parties' political positions were less rigid than they had been in the past. In 1911 the Liberals, Centre and Social Democrats had made it possible to reform the constitution of Alsace–Lorraine. In 1912 the FVP and Social Democrats concluded a comprehensive agreement on runoff elections. The party leadership's action led to protests from some members, and the agreement was followed by only about half the voters. It was also opposed by some in the Social Democratic Party.

In the 1912 Reichstag election, the FVP received 11.9% of the vote and 41 seats. Compared to the 50 seats won by the founding parties in 1907, it meant a parliamentary weakening of left-wing liberalism. The share of the vote, however, had increased by 1.2 percentage points compared to 1907. (The discrepancy between the loss of seats and the gain in the percentage of votes was likely due to the large differences in the number of voters in electoral districts.)

In the Reichstag, the FVP and Social Democrats worked together, and at times the National Liberals also joined them. In 1913 the FVP and the SPD pushed through a capital gains tax against the opposition of the conservatives in order to finance an increase in the size of the army.

== World War I ==
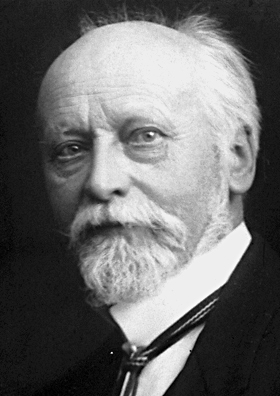
Ludwig Quidde, a pacifist member of the FVP who was awarded the Nobel Peace Prize in 1927

In the early phases of World War I, there were essentially three positions on its aims. Some in the FVP, including Friedrich Naumann, assumed a victory which would allow Germany to establish a "Central Europe" (Mitteleuropa) that it would dominate. They also called for annexations and the formation of buffer states around Germany. A middle group advocated a peace based on security needs, while the third group pushed for a negotiated peace. One opponent of expansionist war aims was the 1927 Nobel Peace Prize winner Ludwig Quidde. Conflicts arose between FVP members who held different positions, although overall the party kept to the middle on the issue of war aims.

The FVP worked with the Centre Party, the Social Democrats and, at times, the National Liberals in the inter-party committee which they formed in July 1917 to coordinate their work in the Reichstag. The committee supported the Reichstag Peace Resolution of 19 July 1917 which called for a peace treaty with no annexations and no indemnities. In the same year, Friedrich von Payer became vice chancellor in Georg von Hertling's government, making the left-liberals something close to a governing party. The FVP also backed the October 1918 constitutional reforms, which transformed the German Empire into a parliamentary monarchy during the government of Max von Baden. Conrad Haussmann of the FVP was a minister without portfolio in Baden's cabinet. On 20 November 1918, in the early weeks of the post-war German revolution, the Progressive People's Party dissolved itself and merged with the left wing of the National Liberal Party to form the German Democratic Party (DDP) of the Weimar Republic.

== Notable members ==
- Gertrud Bäumer, writer and feminist
- Theodor Heuss, president of West Germany 1949–1959
- Johannes Kaempf, president of the Reichstag 1912–1918
- Georg Kerschensteiner, educational theorist
- Helene Lange, advocate for women's access to higher education
- Franz von Liszt, criminologist and international law reformer
- Friedrich Naumann, liberal reformer and Protestant pastor
- Otto Nuschke, active in Weimar Republic and East German politics
- Friedrich von Payer, vice chancellor of the German Empire 1917–1918
- Hugo Preuß, chief drafter of the Weimar Constitution
- Ludwig Quidde, pacifist and Nobel Peace Prize winner
- Reinhold Maier, leader of the liberal Free Democrats (FDP) from 1957–1960

Preceded by Free-minded People's Party	Progressive People's Party; 1910–1918	Succeeded by German Democratic Party
Preceded by Free-minded Union	Progressive People's Party; 1910–1918	Succeeded by German Democratic Party
Preceded by German People's Party	Progressive People's Party; 1910–1918	Succeeded by German Democratic Party
