= Ludwig Bamberger =

German politician (1823–1899)

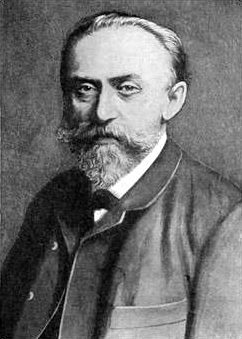
- Ludwig Bamberger.
- Born: 22 July 1823; Mainz, Grand Duchy of Hesse (now Germany)
- Died: 14 March 1899 (aged 75)

Ludwig Bamberger (22 July 1823 – 14 March 1899) was a German Jewish economist, politician, revolutionary and writer.

== Early life ==
Bamberger was born into the wealthy Ashkenazi Jewish Bamberger family in Mainz. After studying at Giessen, Heidelberg, and Göttingen, he became a lawyer.

== Career ==
When the revolution of 1848 broke out Bamberger took an active part as one of the leaders of the republican party in his native city, both as a popular orator and as editor of the Mainzer Zeitung newspaper. In 1849 he took part in the republican uprising in the Palatinate and Baden; on the restoration of order he was condemned to death, but by then with other leading revolutionaries like Germain Metternich, Louis Blenker, and Franz Zitz he had escaped to Switzerland. The next years he spent in exile, at first in London, then in the Netherlands; in 1852 he went to Paris, where, by means of private connections to the Bischoffsheim family, he received an appointment in the bank of Bischoffsheim, Goldschmidt & Cie, of which he became managing director, a post which he held till 1866. During these years he saved a competence and gained a thorough acquaintance with the theory and practice of finance. This he put to account when the amnesty of 1866 enabled him to return to Germany.

He was elected a member of the Reichstag, where he joined the National Liberal Party, for, like many other exiles, he was willing to accept the results of Otto von Bismarck’s work. Bamberger represented the electoral district of Bingen-Alzey and married Anna Belmont, a relative of the famous banker August Belmont, who had emigrated to the United States. In 1868 he published a short life of Bismarck in French, with the object of producing a better understanding of German affairs, and in 1870, owing to their intimate acquaintance with France and with finance, he and Gerson Bleichröder were summoned by Bismarck to Versailles to help in the discussion of terms of peace.

There was a very strident anti-Semitic tone at Versailles. Bamberger, a respected leader of the loyalist National Liberal Party, was immediately dubbed the "red Jew." Bismarck wanted the parliamentarians at Versailles, but spoke especially harshly of the Jews, calling them rootless, hustling and omnipresent. On the other hand, Bleichroeder, also a Jew, probably did not experience any of this antisemitism, being very influential and close to Bismarck.

In the German Reichstag he was the leading authority on matters of finance and economics, as well as a clear and persuasive speaker, and it was chiefly owing to him that a gold currency was adopted and that the Reichsbank took form; in his later years he wrote and spoke strongly against bimetallism. He was the leader of the free traders, and after 1878 refused to follow Bismarck in his new policy of protection, state socialism and colonial development. On account of his opposition to Bismarck's economic policy, he left the National Liberal Party and joined the “Secessionists” which later merged into the German Free-minded Party. He was also a founder of the Verein zur Förderung der Handelsfreiheit (Group for the Promotion of Free Trade).

With private banker Adelbert Delbrück, on 22 January 1870, he founded Deutsche Bank in Berlin as a specialist bank for foreign trade. In 1892 he retired from political life and died in 1899.

== Writings ==
Bamberger was a clear and attractive writer and was a frequent contributor on political and economic questions to the Nation and other periodicals. Among his noted publications—which include works on the currency, on the French war indemnity, his criticism of socialism and his apology for the Secession—are:

- Erlebnisse aus der pfälzischen Erhebung (Experiences from the Palatine Uprising, 1849)
- Monsieur de Bismarck (Herr von Bismarck, 1868; English translation, 1869)
- "La colonie allemande" (in Paris Guide, 1868; English translation "Germans in Paris" 2016)
- Die fünf Milliarden (The five billion, 1873)
- Deutschland und der Sozialismus (Germany and Socialism, 1878)
- Deutschtum und Judentum (Germans and Jews, 1880)
- Die Stichworte der Silberleute besprochen (Terminology of the silver advocates explained, 4th ed., 1893)
- Erinnerungen (Reminiscences, published by Nathan, 1899).

== See also ==
- Forty-Eighters
