= Otto von Helldorff =

German politician (1833–1908)

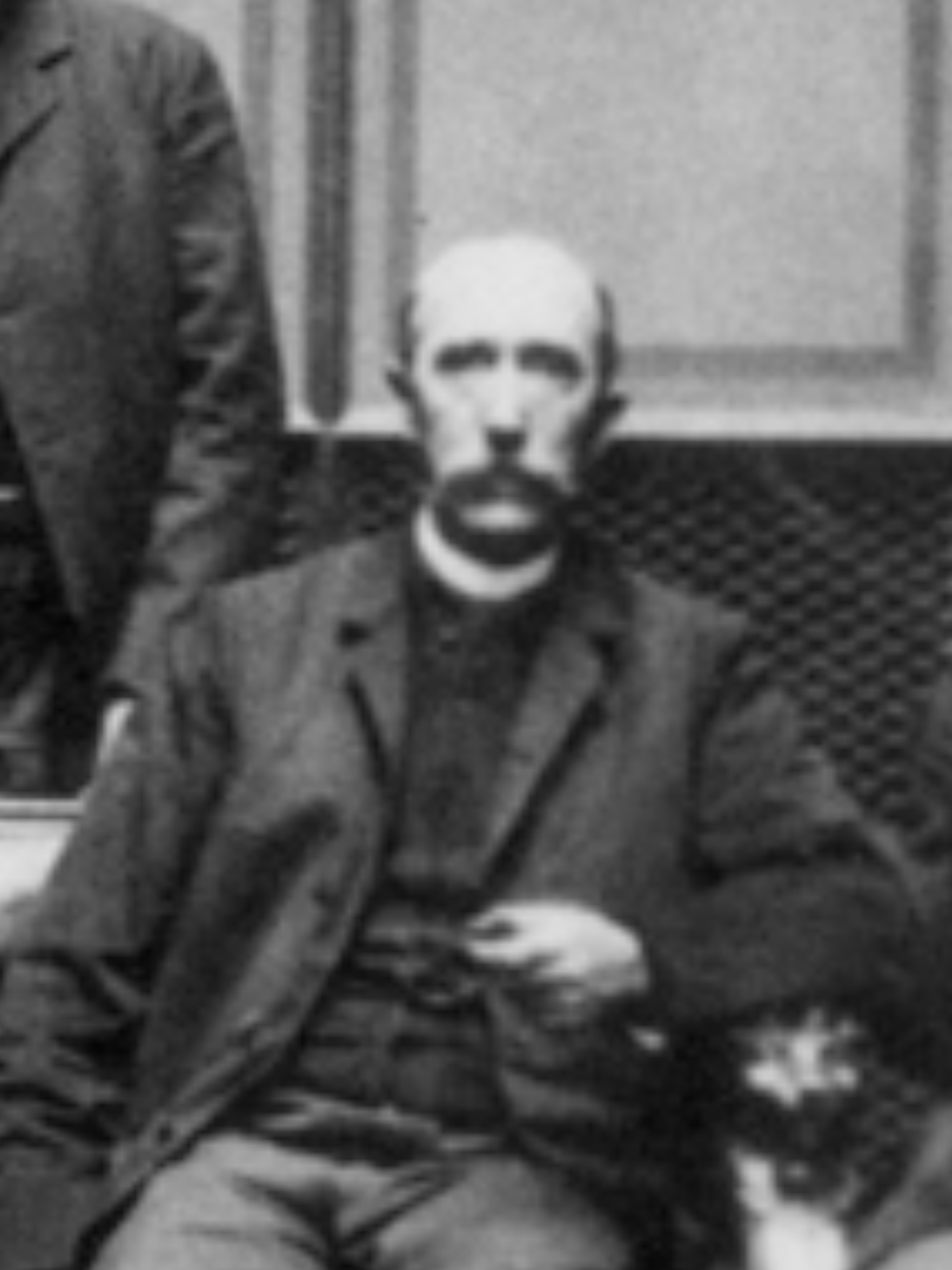
- Otto von Helldorff as member of the Reichstag parliamentary group of the German Conservative Party

Member of the Reichstag
- In office 1890–1893
- In office 1877–1887
- In office 1871–1873

Personal details
- Born: April 16, 1833 Castle Bedra, Prussia, German Confederation
- Died: March 10, 1908 (aged 74) Castle Bedra, Prussia, German Empire
- Political party: German Conservative Party

Otto von Helldorff (16 April 1833 in Bedra, Province of Saxony – 10 March 1908 in Bedra, Province of Saxony) was a German landowner and politician for the German Conservative Party.

== Life ==
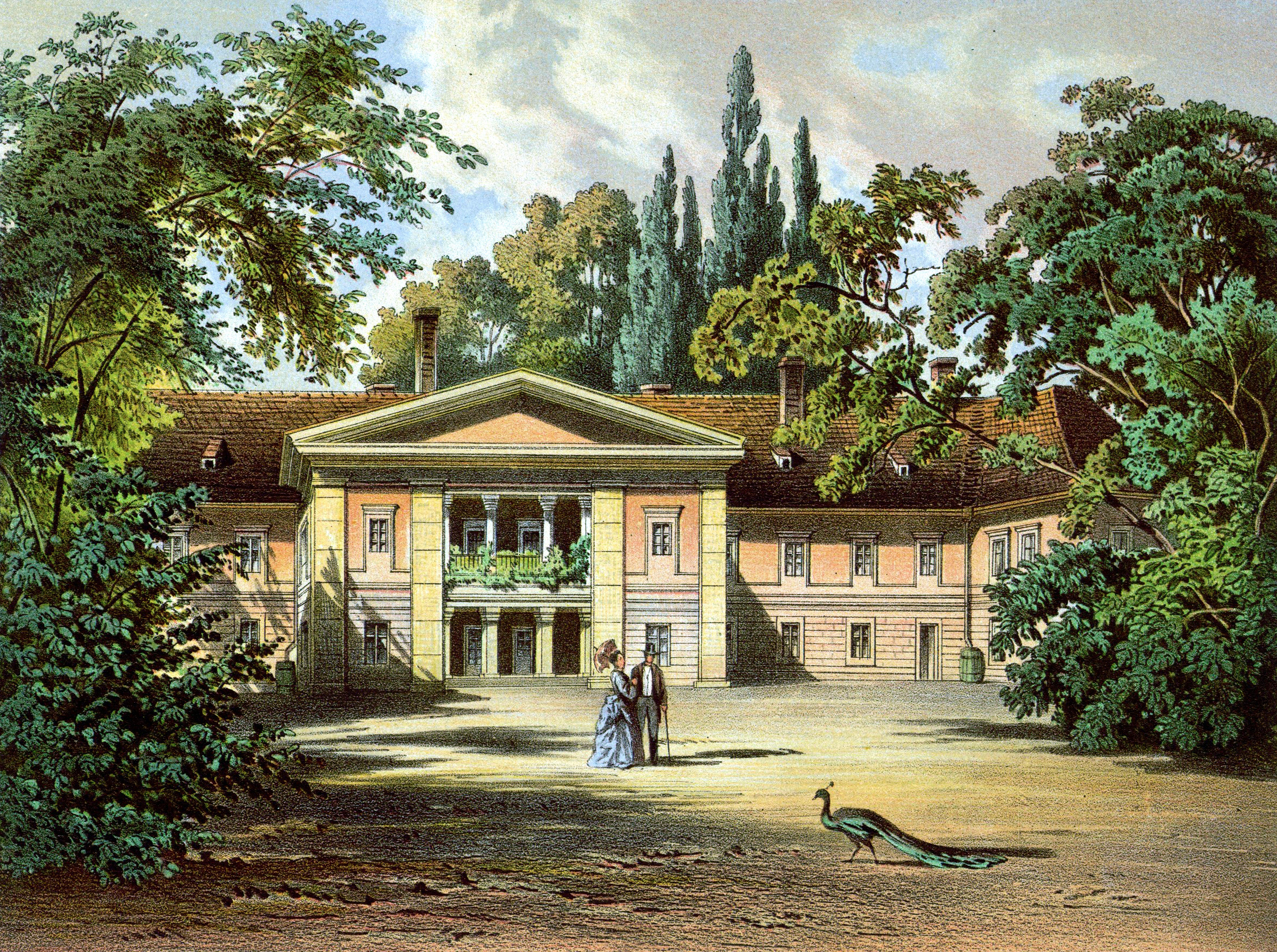
Castle Bedra around 1860, Alexander Duncker

His father was landowner and politician Heinrich von Helldorff (1799–1873) and Julie Charlotte Gräfin von der Schulenburg (1806–1844). He owned Castle Bedra in the Prussian Province of Saxony and land in Leiha, Schalkendorf and Petzkendorf. He studied German law. From 1871 to 1874, from 1877 to 1887 and from 1890 to 1893 Helldorf was member of German Reichstag. From 1879 to 1881 and 1884 to 1892 he was president of fraction German Conservative Party in Reichstag and until 1892 president of party German Conservative Party. From 1890, Helldorff was a member of the Prussian House of Lords. On 7 July 1867 he married in Hamburg Clara Stammann (1846-1918).
