= Constitution of Prussia =

The Constitution of Prussia can refer to the following:

- Constitution of Prussia (1848)
- Constitution of Prussia (1850)
- Constitution of Prussia (1920)
