= Constitution of Prussia (1920) =

Constitution of the Free State of Prussia

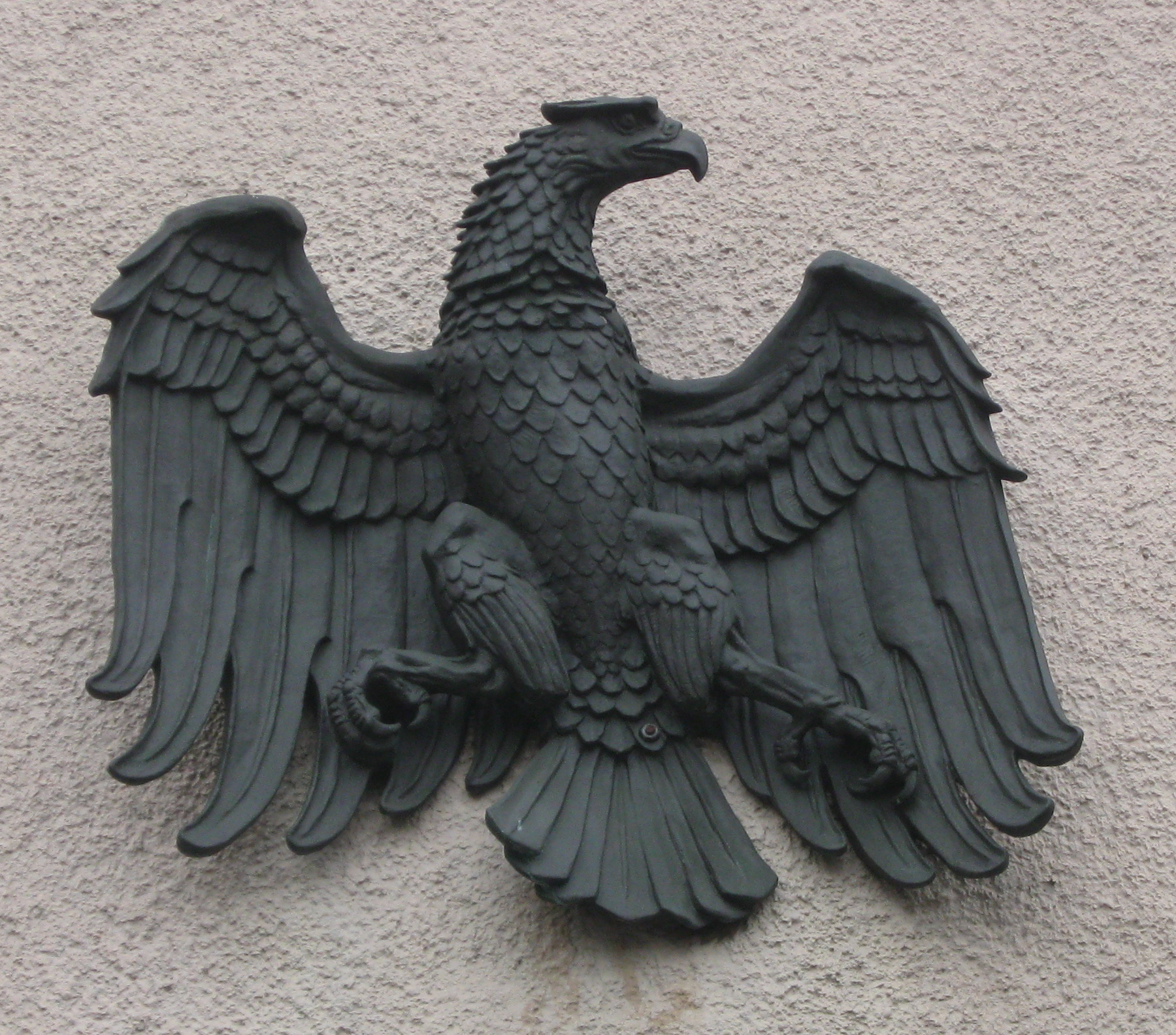
Eagle of the Free State on a police station building.

The Prussian Constitution of 1920 (German: Verfassung von Preußen 1920) formed the legal framework for the Free State of Prussia, a constituent state of the Weimar Republic, from 1918 to 1947. It was based on democratic parliamentary principles and replaced the Constitution of 1848/50. During Nazi Germany, it was eroded to the point of irrelevance and following World War II lost legal force when the state of Prussia was abolished by the Allies in 1947.

The Constitution provided for a Landtag (parliament) elected by proportional representation under universal suffrage for both men and women, and a State Council (Staatsrat) elected by local parliaments to represent the interests of Prussia's provinces. Executive authority rested with the State Ministry, headed by a minister president who was elected by and responsible to the Landtag. He appointed and directed the other ministers and was responsible for setting policy. Unlike the Weimar Constitution, the 1920 Prussian Constitution did not provide for a president. While it remained in force, Prussia was among the most stable and democratic states of the Weimar Republic.

== Historical background ==
Until the German Revolution of 1918–1919, Prussia was governed by the 1850 Constitution of the Kingdom of Prussia. It was an amended version of the Constitution of 1848 that King Frederick William IV had imposed following the German revolutions of 1848–1849. It established a constitutional monarchy with a two-chamber parliament and included a catalog of fundamental rights, but the king, who could veto any law, bypass the judiciary and had control of the military, remained the strongest power in the state. The Constitution's most controversial feature, which Social Democrats in particular criticized during the lifetime of the German Empire, was the three-class franchise that weighted votes based on the amount of taxes paid.

After the revolution, existing laws initially continued to apply except where they explicitly contradicted the new democratic order. The Prussian House of Representatives and House of Lords were therefore dissolved on 15 November 1918. The three-class franchise system was also replaced by universal suffrage for men and women. The Prussian State Assembly, which was to draw up a new constitution for Prussia, was elected under the expanded franchise on 26 January 1919.

== Prussian State Assembly ==
The decision to elect an assembly to discuss a future democratic Prussian constitution was made at the meetings of the revolutionary Prussian Council of People's Deputies on 12 and 14 December 1918, when Otto Braun, Paul Hirsch and Eugen Ernst of the Majority Social Democratic Party (MSPD) succeeded in getting the more radical Independent Social Democratic Party (USPD) to abandon its opposition. The elections were to take place one week before the elections to the Weimar National Assembly, which was to adopt a national constitution for Germany. Hugo Preuß, who went on to write the draft version of the Weimar Constitution for the National Assembly, advocated splitting up the state of Prussia because of its size (almost two-thirds of both Germany's population and area) and therefore wanted to have the Prussian State Assembly meet only after fundamental decisions had been made at the national level. The early voting date was part of the interim Prussian government's attempt to prevent a breakup of the state.

=== Election and composition ===
The election to the State Assembly took place on 26 January 1919, one week after (rather than before) the elections for the Weimar National Assembly. It was the first statewide election in Prussia which was held under universal, equal and secret suffrage for men and women instead of the three-class system. Of 401 deputies elected, 26 were women. The voter turnout was about 74%.

The following parties gained enough votes to win at least one seat:

Party	Votes	%	Seats
Social Democratic Party (SPD)	6,278,291	36.38	145
Centre Party	3,834,953	22.22	93
German Democratic Party (DDP)	2,796,359	16.20	65
German National People's Party (DNVP)	1,936,939	11.22	48
Independent Social Democratic Party (USPD)	1,280,803	7.42	24
German People's Party (DVP)	981,665	5.69	23
German-Hanoverian Party (DHP)	84,975	0.49	2
Schleswig-Holstein Farmers and Farmworkers Democracy (SHBLD)	61,565	0.36	1

The Assembly convened for its constituent session on 13 March 1919. A total of 27 members were chosen for the constitutional committee that was responsible for drafting the constitution. Eleven were from the MSPD, six from the Centre Party, four the German Democratic Party (DDP), four the German National People's Party (DNVP), and one each from the USPD and the German People's Party (DVP).

=== Events and resolutions ===
On 20 March 1919, the State Assembly passed a "Law on the Provisional Order of State Power in Prussia". It regulated the most important organizational issues as a kind of transitional constitution until a formal constitution was adopted. In the initial debates, the conservative DNVP argued for a strong president at the head of the state as a counterweight to the parliament. Ernst Heilmann of the MSPD spoke against the DNVP and at the same time advocated a unitary German state. The DDP supported him, while the DVP also advocated a strong state president. The USPD wanted a reference to the overthrow of the monarchy and mention of workers' councils. A few days after enacting the provisional law, with the Centre Party abstaining, the State Assembly passed a resolution against a possible breakup of the state such as Hugo Preuß had proposed in initial drafts for the national constitution.

Under the provisional law, a collegial government was headed by a minister president (similar to a prime minister) rather than by a president as was the case in other German states. The minister president did not have the authority to issue directives as he did in the later, formal constitution, but his vote was decisive in the event of a tie in the cabinet. The government as a whole had the rights formerly vested in the king. The president of the State Assembly (Robert Leinert of the MSPD) had the right to appoint the minister president and the remaining ministers.

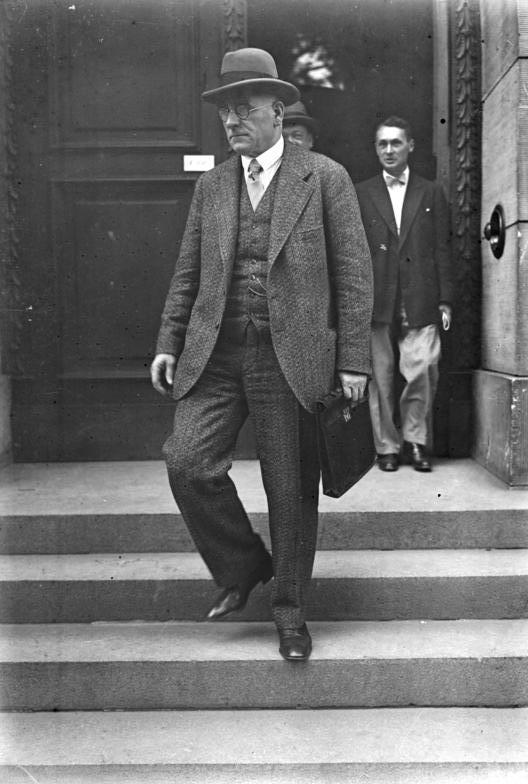
Otto Braun, who was minister president of Prussia with only two short breaks from 1920 to 1932

On 25 March 1919, Leinert appointed a coalition cabinet consisting of members of the MSPD, Centre Party and DDP under Paul Hirsch (MSPD). After the failed Kapp Putsch of 13–18 March 1920, the government resigned and the first cabinet of Otto Braun (MSPD) was formed on 29 March.

In April 1920 the Assembly approved the formation of Greater Berlin, which greatly expanded the size and population of the Prussian capital. On 23 June 1920, it passed the law on the abolition of the nobility's privileges of status (which was also a part of the Weimar Constitution). An attempt to strengthen the political independence of Prussia's provinces failed.

=== Discussion of the Constitution ===
Because of the past close ties between the Reich and Prussia, and also because of Prussia's size and importance, it was necessary to wait until the main features of the Reich Constitution had been defined before taking any action. It was advantageous to the Prussian State Assembly that the practical experience gained from its interaction with the new government in Berlin could be incorporated into the drafting of the Constitution. The Assembly was also able to learn from both the other state constitutions and the national Constitution.

The Prussian Ministry of the Interior prepared a first draft of a constitution which was forwarded to the State Assembly on 25 February 1920. The Kapp Putsch then caused a further delay. It was Carl Severing of the MSPD who finally brought the draft to the Assembly on 26 April 1920. In principle there was to be a unicameral parliament. The interests of the provinces, especially in financial matters, were to be taken into account by a financial council. That the debate would not be easy was made clear by the MSPD spokesman, who put forward a series of amendments, including criticism of the government's planned right to dissolve the state parliament. The conservative parties once again raised the issue of the state president and of a second chamber.

The deliberations in the constitutional committee began on 16 June 1920, by which time the political environment at the national level had changed significantly as a result of the Kapp Putsch. The parties of the Weimar Coalition (MSPD, DDP and Centre) lost a considerable number of seats in the Reichstag elections of 6 June to the political right (DNVP and DVP) and the more extreme left (USPD). As a result, the coalition in the State Assembly felt pressured to compromise in order to stabilize the government in Prussia. In a total of three committee deliberations, the coalition partners reached a compromise acceptable to all: a strictly parliamentary system without a president. The minister president was to determine the guidelines of policy and have a position of strength similar to that of the British prime minister. In addition to the State Assembly (Landtag), the State Council (Staatsrat) representing the provinces was the equivalent of a second chamber.

After the work in the committee, the plenum dealt with the draft, some of which had been heavily modified, in three readings. On 30 November 1920, the new Constitution of the Free State of Prussia was adopted with 280 votes from the MSPD, Centre Party, DDP and DVP against 60 votes from the DNVP and USPD, with the German-Hanoverian Party abstaining.

The adopted Constitution ultimately proved to be a factor in Prussia's political stability.

== Content ==
The Constitution began with the statement that Prussia was a republic and a member of the German Reich.

The people as a whole were the bearers of state power. They could exercise their rights directly through plebiscites (referendums) or indirectly through their representatives in the Landtag (parliament). The State Ministry, made up of the minister president and the state ministers, was the supreme executive. There was no president or presidential equivalent. The judiciary was made up of independent courts subject only to the law.

The electoral system for the Landtag was proportional representation. With a few restrictions, all German citizens over twenty years of age living in Prussia, both men and women, were allowed to vote. The right to vote was "universal and equal" and exercised secretly and directly. Deputies were not bound by instructions or orders – that is, there was not an imperative mandate. The duration of the legislative period was four years. The Landtag had the right to dissolve itself and could also be dissolved by a committee consisting of the minister president and the presidents of the State Council and the Landtag, as well as by referendum. The Landtag passed laws based on the Constitution and approved the budget. Amendments to the Constitution could be made by the Landtag with a two-thirds majority vote. It had to convene at the request of at least one-fifth of the deputies or at the request of the State Ministry. In contrast to the period before 1918, the Landtag had the right of self-assembly and could determine its own closing and reconvening.

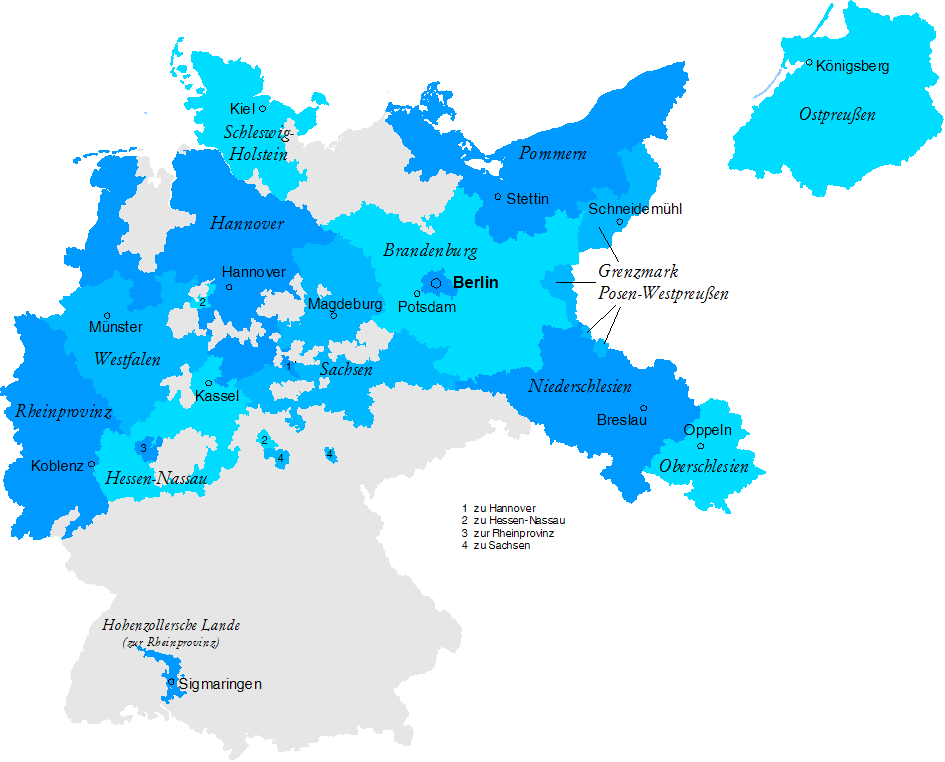
The Prussian provinces and their capitals in 1925. Smaller exclaves are not shown.

The State Council represented the provinces and gave them a voice in legislation and administration. The members were elected by the local parliaments or, in the case of Berlin, the city council. The State Ministry had to inform the State Council about state affairs. The State Council had the right to an advisory opinion on proposed legislation. Through the State Ministry, the State Council could introduce bills to the Landtag. The State Council had the right to object to parliamentary resolutions. The Landtag then had to consider the law again and could pass it by a two-thirds majority over the objection of the State Council.

The State Ministry consisted of the minister president, who was elected by the Landtag, and the state ministers. The minister president appointed the ministers, had policy-making authority and was responsible for it in the Landtag. Within their areas of responsibility, ministers worked independently and were also responsible to the Landtag. The minister president presided over the State Ministry and directed its business. In order for confidence to be withdrawn from the State Ministry as a whole or from individual ministers, at least half of the deputies had to agree in a roll call vote. In order to maintain public safety, or in the event of a state of emergency, the State Ministry could issue decrees during a period when Parliament was not in session, in cooperation with the standing committee of Parliament, but it had to obtain subsequent approval after Parliament had convened. If consent was refused, the decree ceased to have effect.

== Later development ==
The Constitution was subsequently amended several times, the first in 1921 following the Upper Silesia plebiscite which led to the creation of the Province of Upper Silesia. Further amendments followed in 1924 and 1928. The 1932 Prussian coup d'état effectively abolished the Prussian government, and at the beginning of National Socialist rule, the Gleichschaltung Laws of March and April 1933 further undermined the effectiveness of the Constitution. It remained formally in force and was not repealed until 1947 when the Prussian state was dissolved by Law No. 46 of the Allied Control Council.
