= Kingdom of Prussia =

German state (1701–1918)

Kingdom of Prussia Königreich Preußen (German)
- 1701–1918
- State flag (1803–1892) Coat of arms (1701–1871)
- Anthem: Borussia "Prussia" (1820–1830) Preußenlied "Song of Prussia" (1830–1840) Royal anthem: "Heil dir im Siegerkranz" "Hail to thee in the Victor's Crown" (1795–1918)
- Status: Kingdom (Note: Sovereign kingdom (former Ducal Prussia only 1701–1772; East Prussia, West Prussia, South Prussia, Netze District, New East Prussia, Lauenburg and Bütow Land and Starostwo of Draheim 1795–1806; East Prussia, West Prussia, Grand Duchy of Posen 1815–1866); Vassal semi-independent of the Polish–Lithuanian Commonwealth (1701–1772, Lauenburg and Bütow Land and Starostwo of Draheim only); Associate of the Swiss Confederation (1707–1806, County of Neuchatel only); Vassal of the Holy Roman Empire (1701–1806, all territories except those listed above); State of the Continental System under occupation by the First French Empire (1806–1813, without the lost County of Neuchâtel and territories ceded to the Duchy of Warsaw or the Free City of Danzig); Member of the Swiss Confederation (1814–1848; County of Neuchatel 1814–1857); Federated state of the German Confederation (1815–1866, only territories previously in the Holy Roman Empire, as well as Lauenburg and Bütow Land and Starostwo of Draheim); Federated state of the North German Confederation (1866–1871, as a whole, king holding the Bundespräsidium); Federated state of the German Empire (1871–1918, as a whole, king holding the Bundespräsidium as the German Emperor))
- Capital: Berlin; Königsberg (1806–1809)
- Common languages: Official: German; Neo-Latin (until 1806) Minorities: Low German; Danish; East Frisian; North Frisian; Polish; Kashubian; Slovincian; Silesian; Czech; Moravian; Upper Sorbian; Lower Sorbian; Polabian (until 18th century); Lithuanian; Old Prussian (until 18th century); Kursenieki; Yiddish; French; Dutch; Romani (Baltic, Sinte)
- Religion: Statewide majority: Protestantism (Lutheran and Calvinist; Prussian United after 1817 (state religion)); Majority in some territories: Catholicism (Note: Ermland; West Prussia; South Prussia; Netze District; New East Prussia; Grand Duchy of Posen; Province of Posen; Lauenburg and Bütow Land; Starostwo of Draheim; Rhine Province; Province of Westphalia; Upper Silesia; County of Glatz); Other minorities: Judaism
- Demonym: Prussian
- Government: Absolute monarchy (until 1848); Semi-constitutional monarchy (from 1848)
- King
  - 1701–1713 (first): Frederick I
  - 1888–1918 (last): Wilhelm II
- Minister President (Note: During the North German Confederation (1866–1871) and German Empire (1871–1918), the Minister President of Prussia was also the Chancellor of Germany.)
  - 1848 (first): A. H. von Arnim-Boitzenburg
  - 1918 (last): Max von Baden
- Legislature: Landtag
  - Upper house: Herrenhaus
  - Lower house: Abgeordnetenhaus
- Historical era: New Imperialism; World War I
  - Coronation of Frederick I: 18 January 1701
  - Dissolution of the Holy Roman Empire: 6 August 1806
  - Formation of German Confederation: 8 June 1815
  - Constitution adopted: 5 December 1848
  - North German Confederation Treaty: 18 August 1866
  - German Empire proclaimed: 18 January 1871
  - Free State of Prussia proclaimed: 9 November 1918
  - Abdication of Wilhelm II (Note: Statement of Abdication of William II): 28 November 1918

Area
- 1756: 348,779 km^{2} (134,664 sq mi)

Population
  - 1713: 1,500,000
  - 1740: 2,200,000
  - 1756: 4,500,000
  - 1786: 5,800,000
  - 1797: 8,700,000
- Currency: 1701–1750 Reichsthaler; 1750–1857 Thaler; 1857–1873 Vereinsthaler; 1873–1914 Goldmark; 1914–1918 Papiermark
Preceded by
Brandenburg–Prussia
Royal Prussia
Principality of Neuchâtel
Polish–Lithuanian Commonwealth
Swedish Pomerania
Free City of Danzig
Duchy of Warsaw
Electorate of Hesse
Duchy of Nassau
Kingdom of Hanover
Duchy of Holstein
Duchy of Schleswig
Saxe-Lauenburg
Lands of the Bohemian Crown
Duchies of Silesia
County of Kladsko
Free City of Frankfurt
Kingdom of Westphalia
Succeeded by
1807: Duchy of Warsaw
Free City of Danzig
Canton of Neuchâtel
1918: Free State of Prussia
Free City of Danzig
Second Polish Republic
First Czechoslovak Republic
Belgium
Denmark
- Today part of: Germany; Poland; Russia; Denmark; Lithuania; Czech Republic; Belgium; The Netherlands

The Kingdom of Prussia (Note: Due to Brandenburg's prominence as the seat of power within the kingdom, it is also sometimes referred to as Prussia-Brandenburg or Brandenburg-Prussia. The erroneous labels Kingdom of Brandenburg and Kingdom of Nordmark have also been applied to the Prussia of this period.) (German: Königreich Preußen, pronounced [ˈkøːnɪkʁaɪç ˈpʁɔʏsn̩]) was a German state that existed from 1701 to 1918. It played a significant role in the unification of Germany in 1871 and was a major constituent of the German Empire until its dissolution in 1918. The Kingdom of Prussia took its name from the historical region of Prussia, and controlled most of said region, although it was based in the Margraviate of Brandenburg, and its capital was Berlin.

The kings of Prussia were from the House of Hohenzollern. The polity of Brandenburg-Prussia, predecessor of the kingdom, became a military power under Frederick William, Elector of Brandenburg, known as "The Great Elector". As a kingdom, Prussia continued its rise to power, especially during the reign of Frederick the Great. He was instrumental in starting the Seven Years' War (1756–1763), holding his own against Austria, Russia, France and Sweden and establishing Prussia's dominant role among the German states, as well as establishing the country as a European great power through the victories of the powerful Prussian Army. Prussia made attempts to unify all the German states (excluding the German cantons in Switzerland) under its rule, and whether Austria would be included in such a unified German domain became an ongoing question. After the Napoleonic Wars led to the creation of the German Confederation, the issue of unifying the German states caused the German revolutions of 1848–1849, with representatives from all states attempting to unify under their own constitution. Attempts to create a federation remained unsuccessful and the German Confederation collapsed in 1866 when the Austro-Prussian War ensued between its two most powerful member states.

Prussia was subsequently the driving force behind establishing in 1866 the North German Confederation, transformed in 1871 into the unified German Empire and considered the earliest continual legal predecessor of today's Federal Republic of Germany. The North German Confederation was seen as more of an alliance of military strength in the aftermath of the Austro-Prussian War but many of its laws were later used in the German Empire. The German Empire successfully unified all of the German states aside from Austria and Switzerland under Prussian hegemony due to the defeat of Napoleon III in the Franco-Prussian War of 1870–1871. The war united all the German states against a common enemy, and with the victory came an overwhelming wave of nationalism, which changed the opinions of some of those who had been against unification.

With the German Revolution of 1918–1919, the Kingdom of Prussia was transformed into the Free State of Prussia. Prussia as a whole was abolished in 1947.

== History ==
=== Background and establishment ===
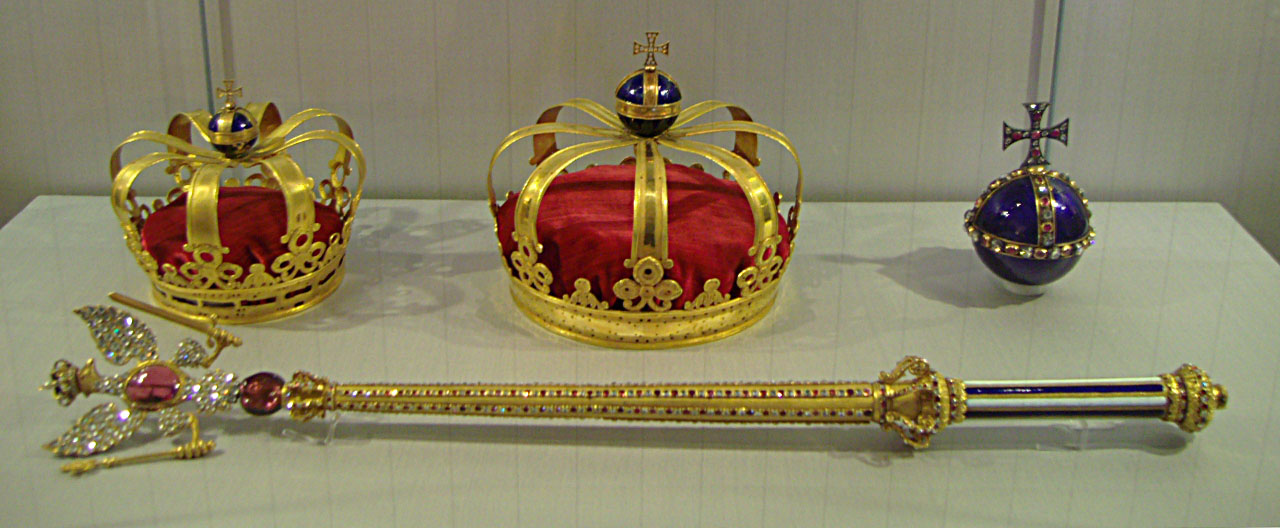
The Prussian Crown Jewels, Charlottenburg Palace, Berlin

In 1510, Albert of Brandenburg, from the House of Hohenzollern, became the last grand master of the Teutonic Order, the ruler of the State of the Teutonic Order in Prussia. In 1525, Albert adopted Lutheranism, secularised the State, and converted it into the Duchy of Prussia. The Teutonic Order had paid homage to Poland since 1466, and Ducal Prussia continued as a Polish fief.

Albert was the great-grandson of Frederick I of Brandenburg, who, in 1415, became the first Hohenzollern elector and margrave of the Margraviate of Brandenburg. In 1529, the Hohenzollerns secured the reversion of the Duchy of Pomerania after a series of conflicts, and acquired its eastern part following the Peace of Westphalia.

In 1618, Albert’s son and successor, Albert Frederick, died without issue, and the electors of Brandenburg then inherited Prussia. It was ruled in a personal union with Brandenburg, known as "Brandenburg-Prussia". A full union was not possible, since Brandenburg was still legally part of the Holy Roman Empire.

In the course of the Second Northern War, the treaties of Labiau and Wehlau-Bromberg granted the Hohenzollerns full sovereignty over the Prussian duchy by September 1657.

In return for an alliance against France in the War of the Spanish Succession, the Great Elector's son, Frederick III, was allowed to elevate Prussia to a kingdom in the Crown Treaty of 16 November 1700. Frederick crowned himself "King in Prussia" as Frederick I on 18 January 1701. Legally, no kingdoms could exist in the Holy Roman Empire except for Bohemia and Italy. However, Frederick took the line that since Prussia had never been part of the empire and the Hohenzollerns were fully sovereign over it, he could elevate Prussia to a kingdom. Emperor Leopold I, keen to secure Frederick's support in the impending War of the Spanish Succession, acquiesced.

The style "King in Prussia" was adopted to acknowledge the legal fiction that the Hohenzollerns were legally kings only in their former duchy. In Brandenburg and the portions of their domains that were within the Empire, they were still legally only electors under the overlordship of the emperor. However, by this time, the emperor's authority was only nominal. The rulers of the empire's various territories acted largely as the rulers of sovereign states, and only acknowledged the emperor's suzerainty in a formal way. In addition, the duchy was only the eastern bulk of the region of Prussia; the westernmost fragment constituted the part of Royal Prussia east of the Vistula, held along with the title King of Prussia by the King of Poland. While the personal union between Brandenburg and Prussia legally continued until the end of the empire in 1806, from 1701 onward, Brandenburg was de facto treated as an integral part of the kingdom. Since the Hohenzollerns were nominally still subjects of the emperor within the parts of their domains that were part of the empire, they continued to use the additional title of Elector of Brandenburg until the empire was dissolved. It was not until 1772 that the title "King of Prussia" was adopted, following the acquisition of Royal Prussia in the First Partition of Poland.

=== 1701–1721: Plague and the Great Northern War ===
The Kingdom of Prussia was still recovering from the devastation of the Thirty Years' War and was poor in natural resources. Its territory was disjointed, stretching 1,200 km (750 mi) from the lands of the Duchy of Prussia on the south-east coast of the Baltic Sea to the Hohenzollern heartland of Brandenburg, with the exclaves of Cleves, Mark and Ravensberg in the Rhineland. In 1708, about one third of the population of East Prussia died during the Great Northern War plague outbreak. The bubonic plague reached Prenzlau in August 1710 but receded before it could reach the capital Berlin, which was only 80 km (50 mi) away.

The Great Northern War was the first major conflict in which the Kingdom of Prussia was involved. Starting in 1700, the war involved a coalition led by Tsarist Russia against the dominant North European power at the time, the Swedish Empire. Crown Prince Frederick William tried in 1705 to get Prussia involved in the war, stating, "best Prussia has her own army and makes her own decisions." His views, however, were not considered acceptable by his father, and it was not until 1713 that Frederick William ascended to the throne. Therefore, in 1715, Prussia, led by Frederick William, joined the coalition for various reasons, including the danger of being attacked from both her rear and the sea; her claims on Pomerania; and the fact that if she stood aside and Sweden lost, she would not get a share of the territory. Prussia only participated in one battle, the Battle of Stresow on the island of Rügen, as the war had already been practically decided in the 1709 Battle of Poltava. In the Treaty of Stockholm, Prussia gained all of Swedish Pomerania east of the River Oder. Sweden would, however, keep a portion of Pomerania until 1815. The Great Northern War not only marked the end of the Swedish Empire but also elevated Prussia and Russia at the expense of the declining Polish–Lithuanian Commonwealth as new powers in Europe.

The Great Elector had incorporated the Junkers, the landed aristocracy, into the kingdom's bureaucracy and military machine, giving them a vested interest in the Prussian Army and compulsory education. King Frederick William I inaugurated the Prussian compulsory conscription system in 1717.

=== 1740–1762: Silesian Wars ===
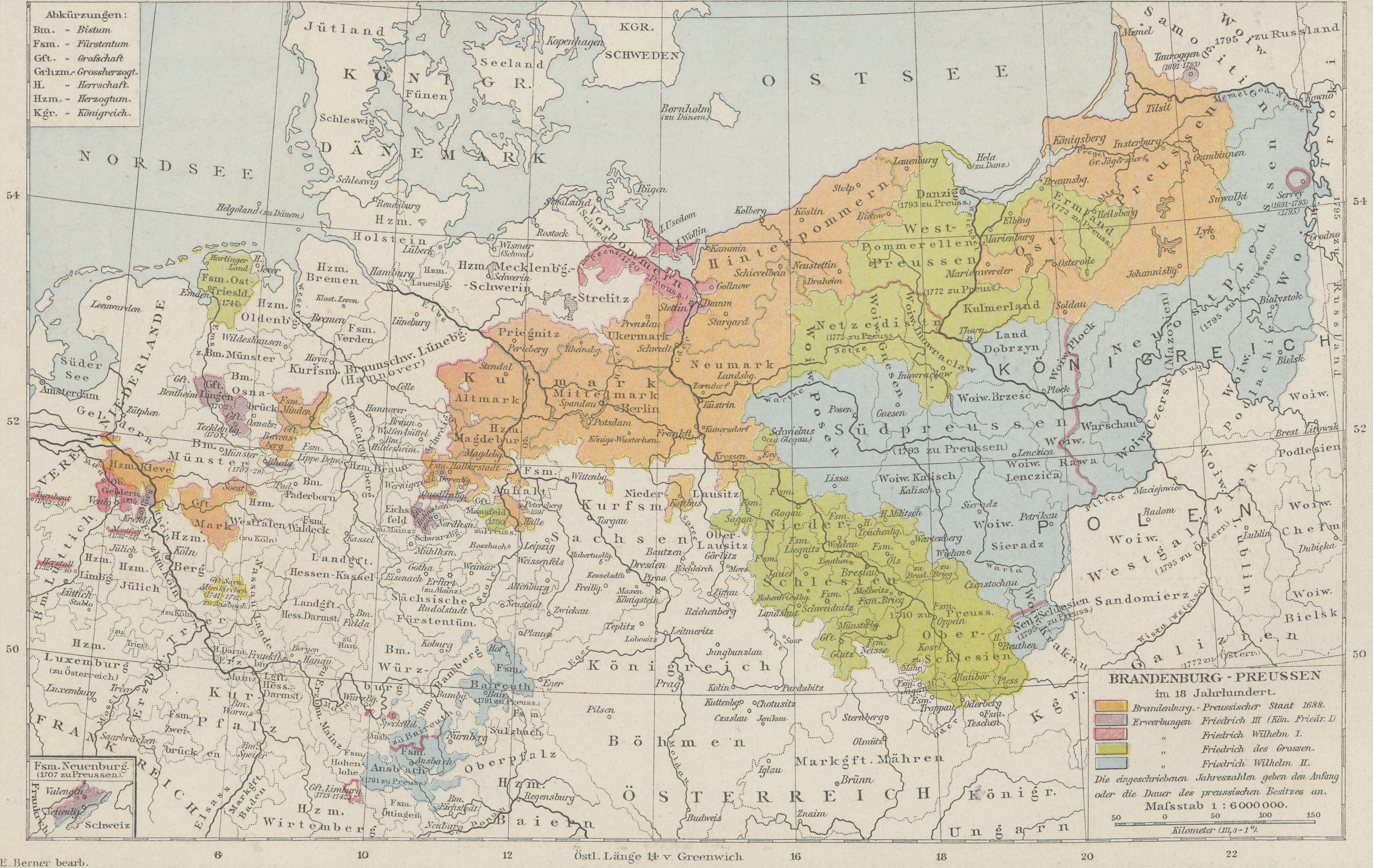
Prussian territorial acquisitions in the 18th century

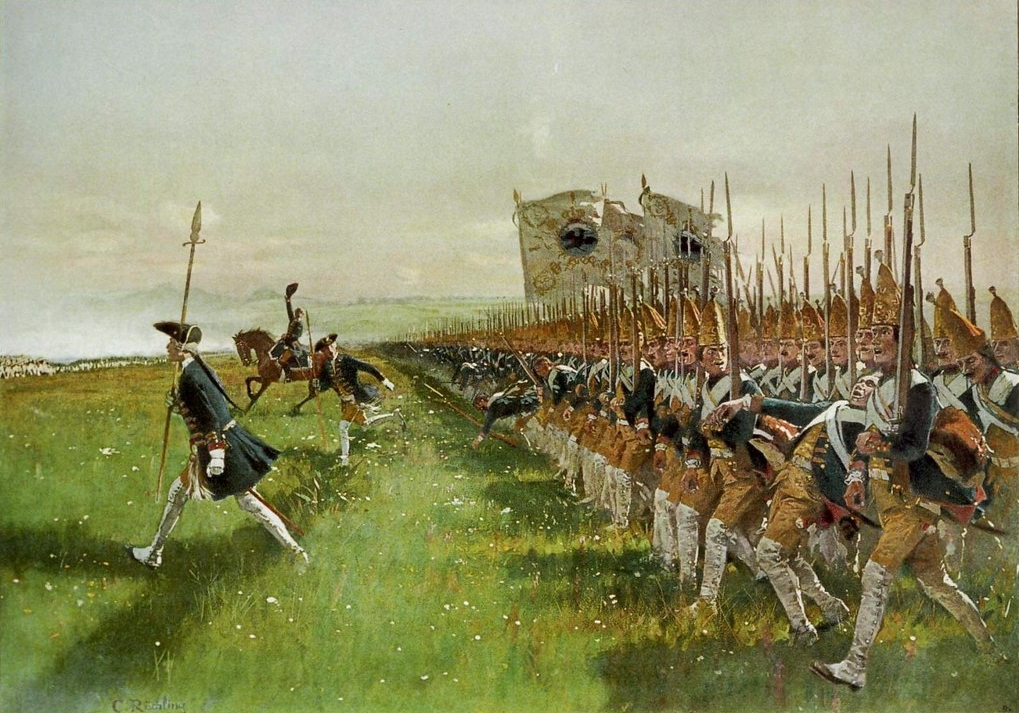
Attack of the Prussian infantry at the Battle of Hohenfriedberg in 1745

In 1740, King Frederick II (Frederick the Great) came to the throne. Using the pretext of a 1537 treaty (vetoed by Emperor Ferdinand I) by which parts of Silesia were to pass to Brandenburg after the extinction of its ruling Piast dynasty, Frederick invaded Silesia, thereby beginning the War of the Austrian Succession. After rapidly occupying Silesia, Frederick offered to protect Queen Maria Theresa if the province were turned over to him. The offer was rejected, but Austria faced several other opponents in a desperate struggle for survival, and Frederick was eventually able to gain formal cession with the Treaty of Berlin in 1742.

To the surprise of many, Austria managed to renew the war successfully. In 1744, Frederick invaded again to forestall reprisals and to claim, this time, the Kingdom of Bohemia. He failed, but French pressure on Austria's ally Great Britain led to a series of treaties and compromises, culminating in the 1748 Treaty of Aix-la-Chapelle that restored peace and left Prussia in possession of most of Silesia.

Humiliated by the cession of Silesia, Austria worked to secure an alliance with France and Russia (the "Diplomatic Revolution"), while Prussia drifted into Great Britain's camp, forming the Anglo-Prussian Alliance. When Frederick preemptively invaded Saxony and Bohemia over the course of a few months in 1756–1757, he began a Third Silesian War and initiated the Seven Years' War.

This war was a desperate struggle for the Prussian Army, and the fact that it managed to fight much of Europe to a draw bears witness to Frederick's military skills. Facing Austria, Russia, France, and Sweden simultaneously, and with only Hanover (and the non-continental British) as notable allies, Frederick managed to prevent a serious invasion until October 1760, when the Russian army briefly occupied Berlin and Königsberg. The situation became progressively grimmer, however, until the death in 1762 of Empress Elizabeth of Russia (Miracle of the House of Brandenburg). The accession of the Prussophile Peter III relieved the pressure on the eastern front. Sweden also exited the war at about the same time.

Defeating the Austrian army at the Battle of Burkersdorf and relying on continuing British success against France in the war's colonial theatres, Prussia was finally able to force a status quo ante bellum on the continent. This result confirmed Prussia's major role within the German states and established the country as a European great power. Frederick, appalled by the near-defeat of Prussia and the economic devastation of his kingdom, lived out his days as a much more peaceable ruler.

Other additions to Prussia in the 18th century were the County of East Frisia (1744), the Principality of Bayreuth (1791) and Principality of Ansbach (1791), the latter two being acquired through purchase from branches of the Hohenzollern dynasty.

=== 1772, 1793 and 1795: Partitions of the Polish–Lithuanian Commonwealth ===
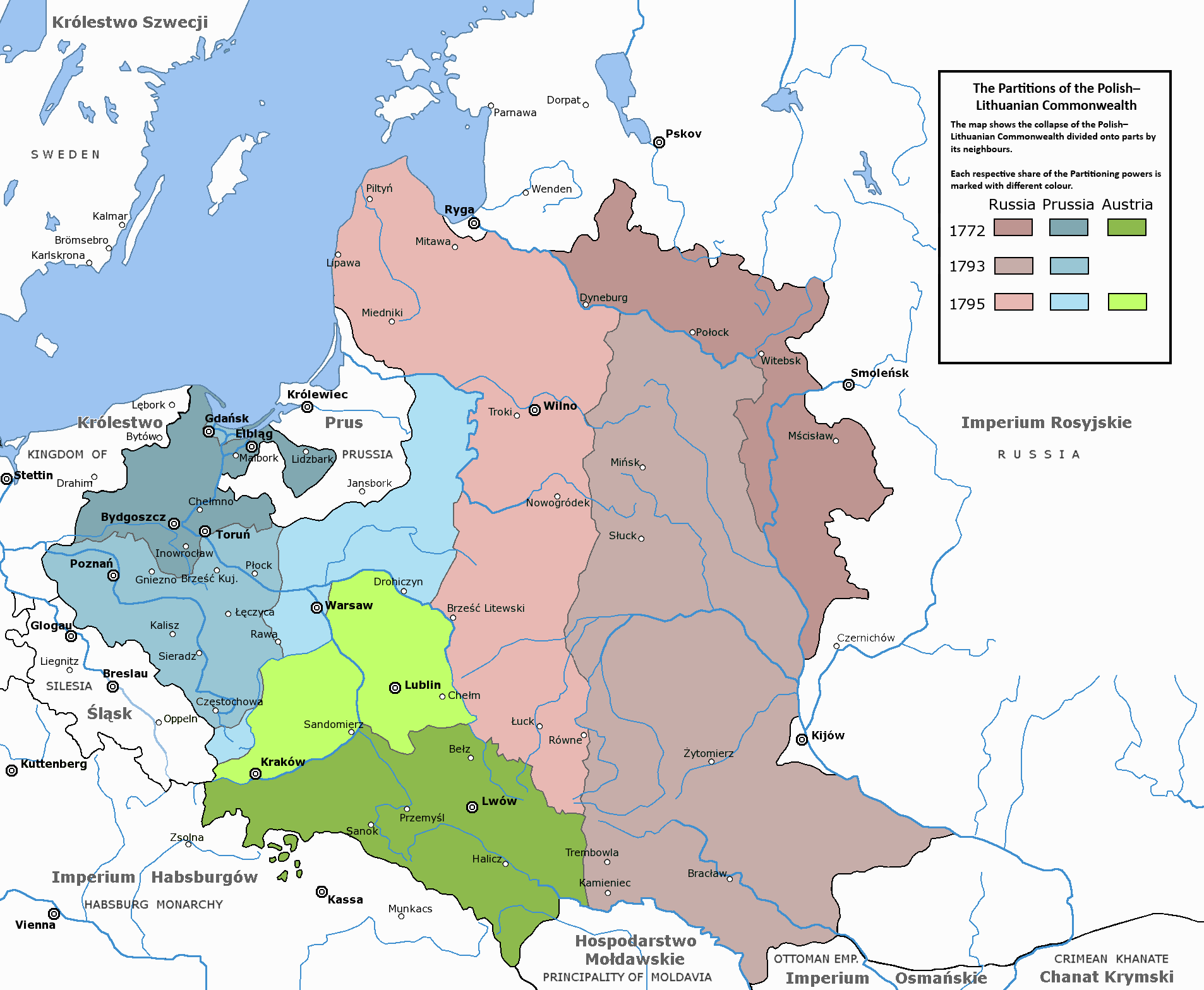
The three partitions of Poland (the Polish–Lithuanian Commonwealth). The Russian Partition (red), the Austrian Partition (green), and the Prussian Partition (blue).

To the east and south of Prussia, the Polish–Lithuanian Commonwealth had gradually weakened during the 18th century. Alarmed by increasing Russian influences in Polish affairs and by a possible expansion of the Russian Empire, Frederick was instrumental in initiating the first of the Partitions of Poland between Russia, Prussia, and Austria in 1772 to maintain a balance of power. The Kingdom of Prussia annexed most of the Polish province of Royal Prussia, including Warmia, allowing Frederick to finally adopt the title King of Prussia; the annexed Royal Prussian land was organised the following year into the Province of West Prussia; most of the rest became the originally separate Netze District, which was attached to West Prussia in 1775. The boundary between West Prussia and the territory previously known as the Duchy of Prussia, now the Province of East Prussia, was also adjusted, transferring Marienwerder to West Prussia (which became its capital) and Warmia (the Heilsberg and Braunsberg districts) to East Prussia. The annexed territory connected East Prussia with the Province of Pomerania, uniting the kingdom's eastern territories.

After Frederick died in 1786, his nephew Fredrick William II continued the partitions, gaining a large part of western Poland in 1793; Thorn (Toruń) and Danzig (Gdańsk), which had remained part of Poland after the first partition, were incorporated into West Prussia, while the remainder became the province of South Prussia.

In 1787, Prussia invaded Holland to restore the Orangist stadtholderate against the increasingly rebellious Patriots, who sought to overthrow the House of Orange-Nassau and establish a democratic republic. The direct cause of the invasion was the arrest at Goejanverwellesluis, where Frederick William II's sister Wilhelmina of Prussia, also stadtholder William V of Orange's wife, was stopped by a band of Patriots who denied her passage to The Hague to reclaim her husband's position.

In 1795, the Polish–Lithuanian Commonwealth ceased to exist and a large area (including Warsaw) to the south and east of East Prussia became part of Prussia. Most of the new territories (and the part of South Prussia north of the Vistula) were organised into the province of New East Prussia; South Prussia gained the area immediately south of the Vistula, Narew and Bug, including Warsaw; a small area to the south of South Prussia became New Silesia. With the Polish–Lithuanian state gone, Prussia now shared its eastern borders with the Habsburg monarchy (West Galicia) and Russia (Russian partition).

The Partitions were facilitated by the fact that they occurred just before the 19th-century rise of nationalism in Europe, and the national self-awareness was yet to be developed in most European peoples, especially among commoners. The Kingdom of Prussia was perceived in Poland more as a nationality-neutral personal holding of the ruling House of Hohenzollern, rather than a German nation-state, and any anxiety concerned predominantly freedom to practice religion rather than rights to maintain national identity. The onset of Germanisation in the following decades, later joined by the Kulturkampf, quickly changed this benign picture and alienated Poles from the Prussian state, ultimately boosting their national self-awareness and eliciting their national resistance against Prussian rule.

=== 1801–1815: Napoleonic Wars ===
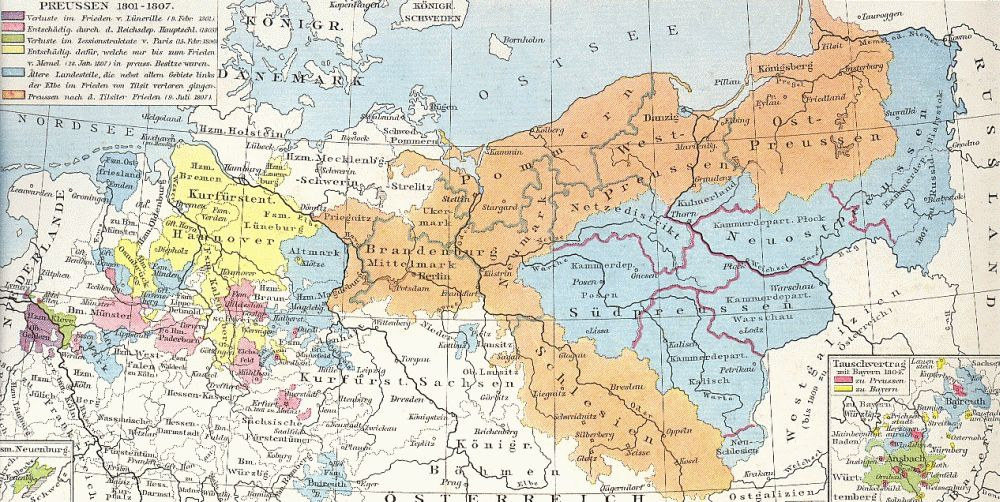
Prussia (orange) and its territories lost after the War of the Fourth Coalition (other colours)

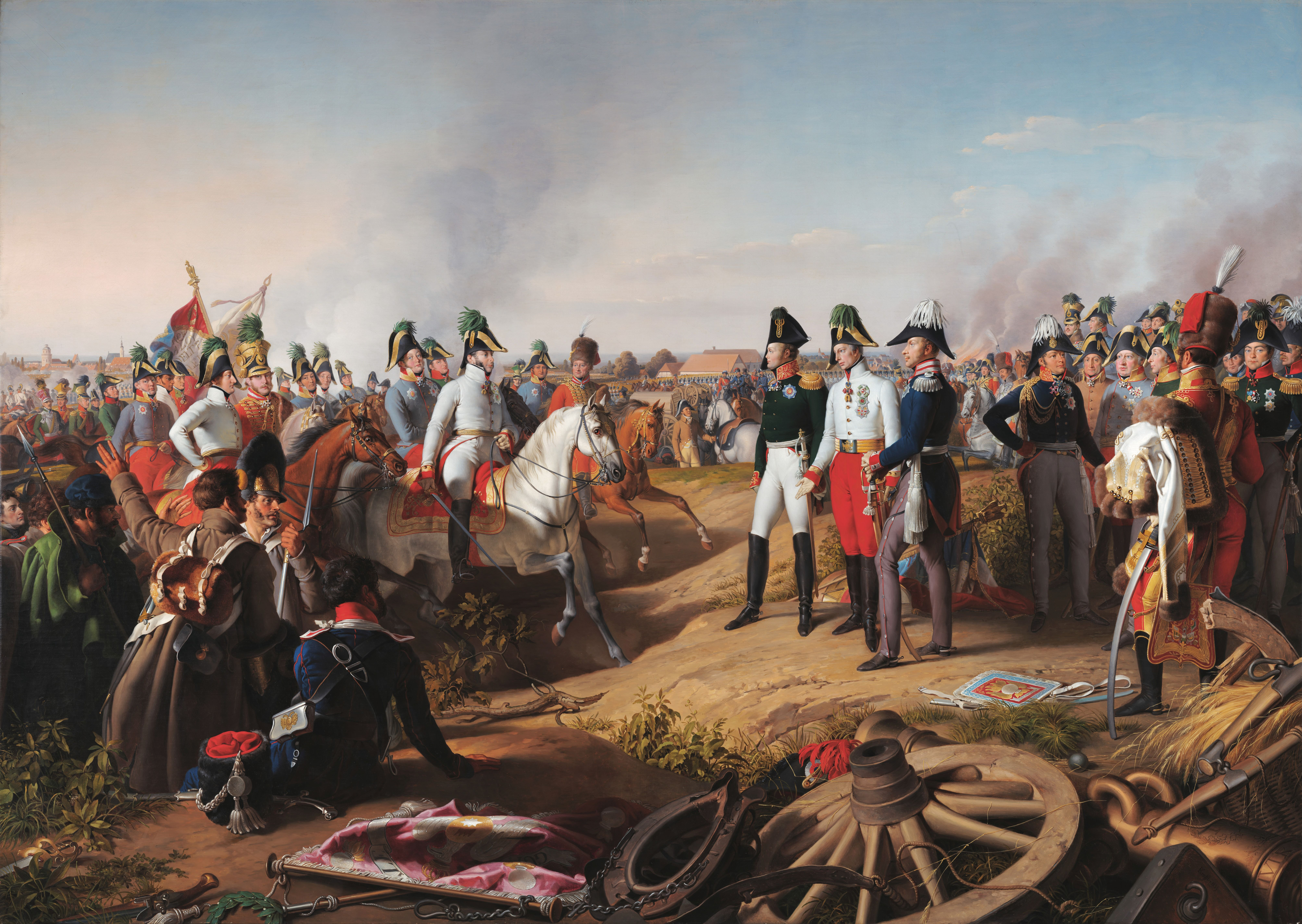
The Declaration of Victory After the Battle of Leipzig by Johann Peter Krafft, 1839. Depicting Frederick William III of Prussia, Alexander I of Russia and Francis I of Austria after the Battle of Leipzig in 1813.

Following the French Revolution and the Execution of Louis XVI, Prussia declared war on the French First Republic. When Prussian troops attempted to invade France, they were beaten back and the Treaty of Basel (1795) ended the War of the First Coalition. In it, the First French Republic and Prussia had stipulated that the latter would ensure the Holy Roman Empire's neutrality in all the latter's territories north of the demarcation line of the River Main, including the British monarch's continental dominions of the Electorate of Hanover and the Duchies of Bremen-Verden. To this end, Hanover (including Bremen-Verden) also had to provide troops for the so-called demarcation army maintaining this state of armed neutrality.

During the War of the Second Coalition, Napoleon urged Prussia to occupy Hanover. In 1801, 24,000 Prussian soldiers invaded Hanover, which surrendered without a fight. In April 1801, Prussian troops occupied Bremen-Verden's capital Stade and remained there until October of that year. Britain first ignored Prussia's hostility, but when the Prussians joined the pro-French Second League of Armed Neutrality alongside Denmark–Norway and Russia the British began to seize Prussian ships. However, following the Battle of Copenhagen the League fell apart and Prussia again withdrew its troops.

At Napoleon's instigation, Prussia reoccupied Hanover and Bremen-Verden in early 1806. On 6 August that year, the Holy Roman Empire was dissolved as a result of Napoleon's victories over Austria. The title of Kurfürst (Prince-elector) of Brandenburg became meaningless, and was dropped. Nonetheless, King Frederick William III was now de jure as well as de facto sovereign of all of the Hohenzollern domains. (Note: When the Holy Roman Empire was dissolved in 1806, the function of prince-electors electing its emperors had lapsed.) Before this time, the Hohenzollern sovereign had held many titles and crowns, from Supreme Governor of the Protestant Churches (summus episcopus) to King, Elector, Grand Duke, Duke for the various regions and realms under his rule. After 1806, he was simply King of Prussia and summus episcopus.

Prussia then turned against the First French Empire, but was defeated in the Battle of Jena–Auerstedt (14 October 1806) and Frederick William III was then forced to temporarily flee to remote Memel. After the Treaties of Tilsit in 1807, Prussia lost about half of its territory, including the land gained from the Second and Third Partitions of Poland (which now fell to the Duchy of Warsaw) and all land west of the Elbe river. France recaptured Prussian-occupied Hanover, including Bremen-Verden. The remainder of the kingdom was occupied by French troops (at Prussia's expense) and the king was obliged to make an alliance with France and join the Continental System.

The Prussian reforms were a reaction to the Prussian defeat in 1806 and the Treaties of Tilsit. It describes a series of constitutional, administrative, social and economic reforms of the kingdom of Prussia. They are sometimes known as the Stein-Hardenberg Reforms after Karl Freiherr vom Stein and Karl August Fürst von Hardenberg, their main instigators.

After the defeat of Napoleon in Russia in 1812, Prussia quit the alliance and took part in the Sixth Coalition during the "Wars of Liberation" (Befreiungskriege) against the French occupation. Prussian troops under Marshal Gebhard Leberecht von Blücher contributed crucially in the Battle of Waterloo of 1815 to the final victory over Napoleon.

=== 1815: After Napoleon ===
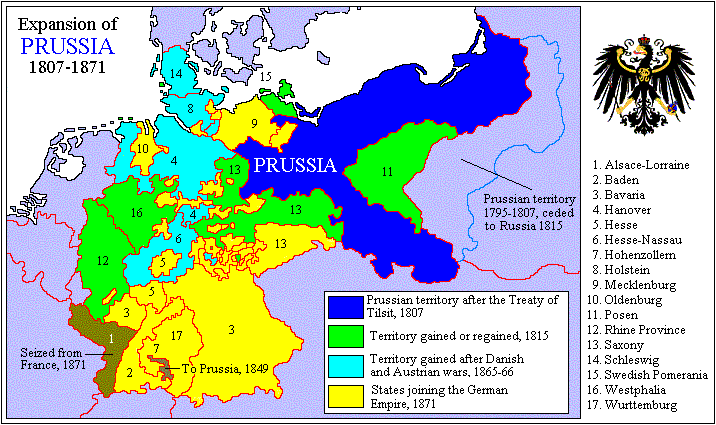
Expansion of Prussia, 1807–1871

Prussia's reward for its part in France's defeat came at the Congress of Vienna. It regained most of its pre-1806 territory. Notable exceptions included part of the territory annexed in the Second and Third Partitions of Poland, which became Congress Poland under Russian rule (though it did retain Danzig, acquired in the Second Partition). It also did not regain several of its former towns in the south. However, as compensation, it picked up some new territory, including 40% of the Kingdom of Saxony and much of Westphalia and the Rhineland. Prussia now stretched uninterrupted from the Niemen in the east to the Elbe in the west, and possessed a chain of disconnected territories west of the Elbe. This left Prussia as the only great power with a predominantly German-speaking population.

With these gains in territory, the kingdom was reorganized into 10 provinces. Most of the kingdom, aside from the provinces of East Prussia, West Prussia, and the autonomous Grand Duchy of Posen but including the formerly Polish Lauenburg and Bütow Land and the Draheim territory, became part of the new German Confederation, a confederacy of 39 sovereign states (including Austria and Bohemia) replacing the defunct Holy Roman Empire.

Frederick William III submitted Prussia to a number of administrative reforms, among others, reorganising the government by way of ministries, which remained formative for the following hundred years.

As to religion, reformed Calvinist Frederick William III — as Supreme Governor of the Protestant Churches — asserted his long-cherished project (started in 1798) to unite the Lutheran and the Reformed Church in 1817, (see Prussian Union). The Calvinist minority, strongly supported by its co-religionist Frederick William III, and the partially reluctant Lutheran majority formed the united Protestant Evangelical Church in Prussia. However, ensuing quarrels caused a permanent schism among the Lutherans into united and Old Lutherans by 1830.

As a consequence of the Revolutions of 1848, the Principalities of Hohenzollern-Sigmaringen and Hohenzollern-Hechingen (ruled by a Catholic cadet branch of the House of Hohenzollern) were annexed by Prussia in 1850, later united as the Province of Hohenzollern.

=== 1848–1871: German wars of unification ===
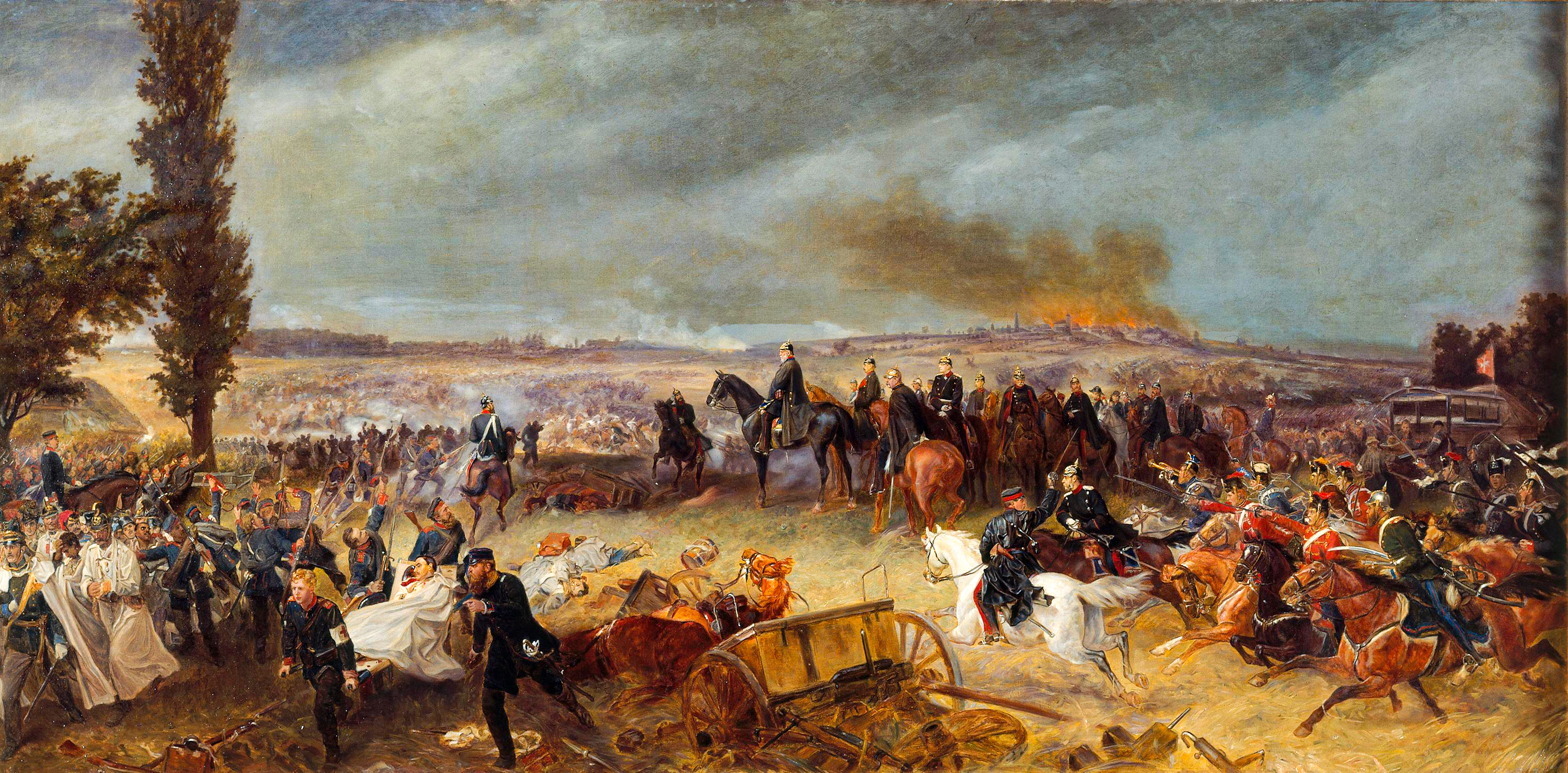
King Wilhelm I on a black horse with his suite, Bismarck, Moltke, and others, watching the Battle of Königgrätz

During the half-century that followed the Congress of Vienna, a conflict of ideals took place within the German Confederation between the formation of a single German nation and the conservation of the current collection of smaller German states and kingdoms. The main debate centered around whether Prussia or the Austrian Empire should be the leading member of any unified Germany. Those advocating for Prussian leadership contended that Austria had far too many non-German interests to work for the greater good of Germany. They argued that Prussia, as by far the most powerful state with a majority of German speakers, was best suited to lead the new nation.

The establishment of the German Customs Union (Zollverein) in 1834, which excluded Austria, increased Prussian influence over the member states. In the wake of the Revolutions of 1848, the Frankfurt Parliament in 1849 offered King Frederick William IV of Prussia the crown of a united Germany. Frederick William refused the offer on the grounds that revolutionary assemblies could not grant royal titles. But he also refused for two other reasons: to do so would have done little to end the internal power-struggle between Austria and Prussia, and all Prussian kings (up to and including William I) feared that the formation of a German Empire would mean the end of Prussia's independence within the German states.

In 1848, actions taken by Denmark towards the Duchies of Schleswig and Holstein led to the First War of Schleswig (1848–1851) between Denmark and the German Confederation, resulting in a Danish victory.

Frederick William issued Prussia's first constitution by his own authority in 1848, modifying it in the Constitution of 1850. These documents — moderate by the standards of the time but conservative by today's — provided for a two-chamber parliament, the Landtag. The lower house, later known as the Abgeordnetenhaus, was elected by all males over the age of 25 using the Prussian three-class franchise. Voters were divided into three classes whose votes were weighted according to the amount of taxes paid. In one typical election, the first class (with those who paid the most in taxes) included 4% of voters and the third class (with those who paid the least) had 82%, yet each group chose the same number of electors. The system all but assured dominance by the more well-to-do men of the population. The upper house, later renamed the Herrenhaus ("House of Lords"), was appointed by the king. He retained full executive authority, and ministers were responsible only to him. As a result, the grip of the landowning classes, the Junkers, remained unbroken, especially in the eastern provinces. The constitution nevertheless contained a number of liberal elements such as the introduction of jury courts and a catalog of fundamental rights that included freedom of religion, speech and the press.

Frederick William suffered a stroke in 1857, and his younger brother, Prince William, became regent. William pursued a considerably more moderate policy. Upon Frederick William IV's death in 1861, he succeeded to the Prussian throne as William I. However, shortly after becoming king, he faced a dispute with his parliament over the size of the army. The parliament, dominated by the liberals, balked at William's desire to increase the number of regiments and withheld approval of the budget to pay for its cost. A deadlock ensued, and William seriously considered abdicating in favour of his son, Crown Prince Frederick. Ultimately, he decided to appoint Otto von Bismarck, at that time the Prussian ambassador to France. Bismarck took office on 23 September 1862.

Although Bismarck had a reputation as an unyielding conservative, he was initially inclined to seek a compromise over the budget issue. However, William refused to consider it; he viewed defence issues as the crown's personal province. Forced into a policy of confrontation, Bismarck came up with a novel theory. Under the constitution, the king and the parliament were responsible for agreeing on the budget. Bismarck argued that since they had failed to come to an agreement, there was a "hole" in the constitution, and the government had to continue to collect taxes and disburse funds in accordance with the old budget in order to keep functioning. The government thus operated without a new budget from 1862 to 1866, allowing Bismarck to implement William's military reforms.

The liberals violently denounced Bismarck for what they saw as his disregard for the fundamental law of the kingdom. However, Bismarck's real plan was an accommodation with liberalism. Although he had opposed German unification earlier in his career, he had now come to believe it was inevitable. To his mind, the conservative forces had to take the lead in the drive toward creating a unified nation in order to keep from being eclipsed. He also believed that the middle-class liberals wanted a unified Germany more than they wanted to break the grip of the traditional forces over society. He thus embarked on a drive to form a united Germany under Prussian leadership and guided Prussia through three wars, which ultimately achieved this goal.

The first of these wars was the Second War of Schleswig (1864), which Prussia initiated and succeeded in, and in which it gained the assistance of Austria. Denmark was soundly defeated and surrendered both Schleswig and Holstein to Prussia and Austria, respectively.

Aftermath of the Austro-Prussian War (1866): Prussia Prussian allies: Italy and 14 German states Austria Austrian allies: 11 German states Neutral states: Liechtenstein, Limburg, Luxembourg, Reuss-Schleiz, Saxe-Weimar-Eisenach, Schwarzburg-Rudolstadt Prussian acquisitions: Hanover, Schleswig-Holstein, Hessian Hinterland, Hesse-Kassel, Nassau and Frankfurt

The divided administration of Schleswig and Holstein then became the trigger for the Austro-Prussian War of 1866 — also known as the Seven Weeks' War. Prussia, allied with the Kingdom of Italy and various northern German states, declared war on the Austrian Empire. The Austrian-led coalition was crushed, and Prussia annexed four of its smaller allies — the Kingdom of Hanover, the Electorate of Hesse, the Duchy of Nassau and the Free City of Frankfurt. Prussia also annexed Schleswig and Holstein, and also effectively annexed Saxe-Lauenburg by forcing it into a personal union with Prussia (which was turned into a full union in 1876). King William initially wanted to take territory from Austria itself and annex Saxony, but Bismarck persuaded him to abandon the idea. While Bismarck wanted Austria to play no future role in German affairs, he foresaw that Austria could be a valuable future ally. With these gains in territory, the Prussian possessions in the Rhineland and Westphalia became geographically connected to the rest of the kingdom for the first time. Counting the de facto annexation of Saxe-Lauenburg, Prussia now stretched uninterrupted across the northern two-thirds of Germany. It would remain at this size until the overthrow of the monarchy in 1918.

Bismarck used this opportunity to end the budget dispute with parliament. He proposed a bill of indemnity granting him retroactive approval for governing without a legal budget. He guessed, correctly as it turned out, that this would lead to a split between his liberal adversaries. While some of them argued that there could be no compromise with the principle of constitutional government, most of the liberals decided to support the bill in hopes of winning more freedom in the future.

The German Confederation was dissolved by Article IV of the peace treaty with Austria. In its place, Prussia cajoled the 21 states north of the Main into forming the North German Confederation in 1866. Prussia entered the Confederation as a whole (including the East Prussian cradle of its statehood, as well as its share of dismembered Poland consisting of Province of Posen and West Prussia), thus becoming the dominant state in this new entity, with four-fifths of its territory and population — more than the other members of the confederation combined. Its near-total control was cemented in a constitution written by Bismarck. Executive power was vested in a president — a hereditary office of the rulers of Prussia. He was assisted by a chancellor responsible only to the president. There was also a bicameral parliament. The lower house, or Reichstag (Diet), was elected by universal male suffrage. The upper house, or Bundesrat (Federal Council), was appointed by the state governments. The Bundesrat was, in practice, the stronger chamber. Prussia had 17 of 43 votes and could easily control proceedings through alliances with the other states. For all intents and purposes, Bismarck dominated the new grouping. He served as his own foreign minister for virtually his entire tenure as prime minister of Prussia, and in that capacity was able to instruct the Prussian delegates to the Bundesrat.

The southern German states (except Austria) were forced to accept military alliances with Prussia as part of the peace settlement, and Prussia began steps to merge them with the North German Confederation. Bismarck's planned Kleindeutschland unification of Germany had come considerably closer to realisation.

The final act came with the Franco-Prussian War (1870–1871), where Bismarck maneuvered Emperor Napoleon III of France into declaring war on Prussia. Activating the German alliances put in place after the Austro-Prussian War, the German states, aside from Austria, came together and swiftly defeated France, even managing to take Napoleon III prisoner (2 September 1870). Even before the end of the war, Bismarck was able to complete the work of unifying Germany under Prussian leadership. The patriotic fervour aroused by the war against France overwhelmed the remaining opponents of a unified Kleindeutschland nation, and on 18 January 1871 (the 170th anniversary of the coronation of the first Prussian king, Frederick I), the German Empire was proclaimed in the Hall of Mirrors at Versailles outside of Paris, while the French capital was still under siege. King William became the first emperor (Kaiser) of a unified Germany. However, the titles of German Emperor and King of Prussia were to be borne by the same man until the end of the monarchy.

=== 1871–1918: Peak and fall ===
Bismarck's new empire was the most powerful state on the Continent. Prussia's dominance over the new empire was almost as absolute as it was with the North German Confederation. It included two-thirds of the empire's territory and three-fifths of its population. The imperial crown was a hereditary office of the House of Hohenzollern. Prussia also had a large plurality of seats in the Bundesrat, with 17 votes out of 58 (17 out of 61 after 1911); no other state had more than six votes. As before, it could effectively control the proceedings with the support of its allies in the secondary states. As mentioned above, Bismarck served as foreign minister of Prussia for almost his entire career, and in that role instructed the Prussian deputies to the Bundesrat. The Imperial German Army was essentially an enlarged Prussian army, and the embassies of the new empire were mostly old Prussian embassies. The Constitution of the German Empire was essentially an amended version of the constitution of the North German Confederation.

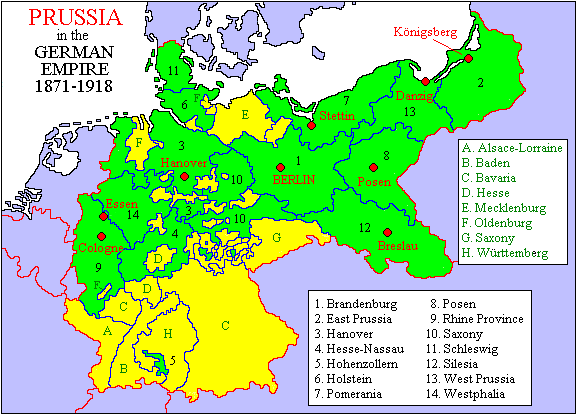
Prussia in the German Empire, 1871–1918

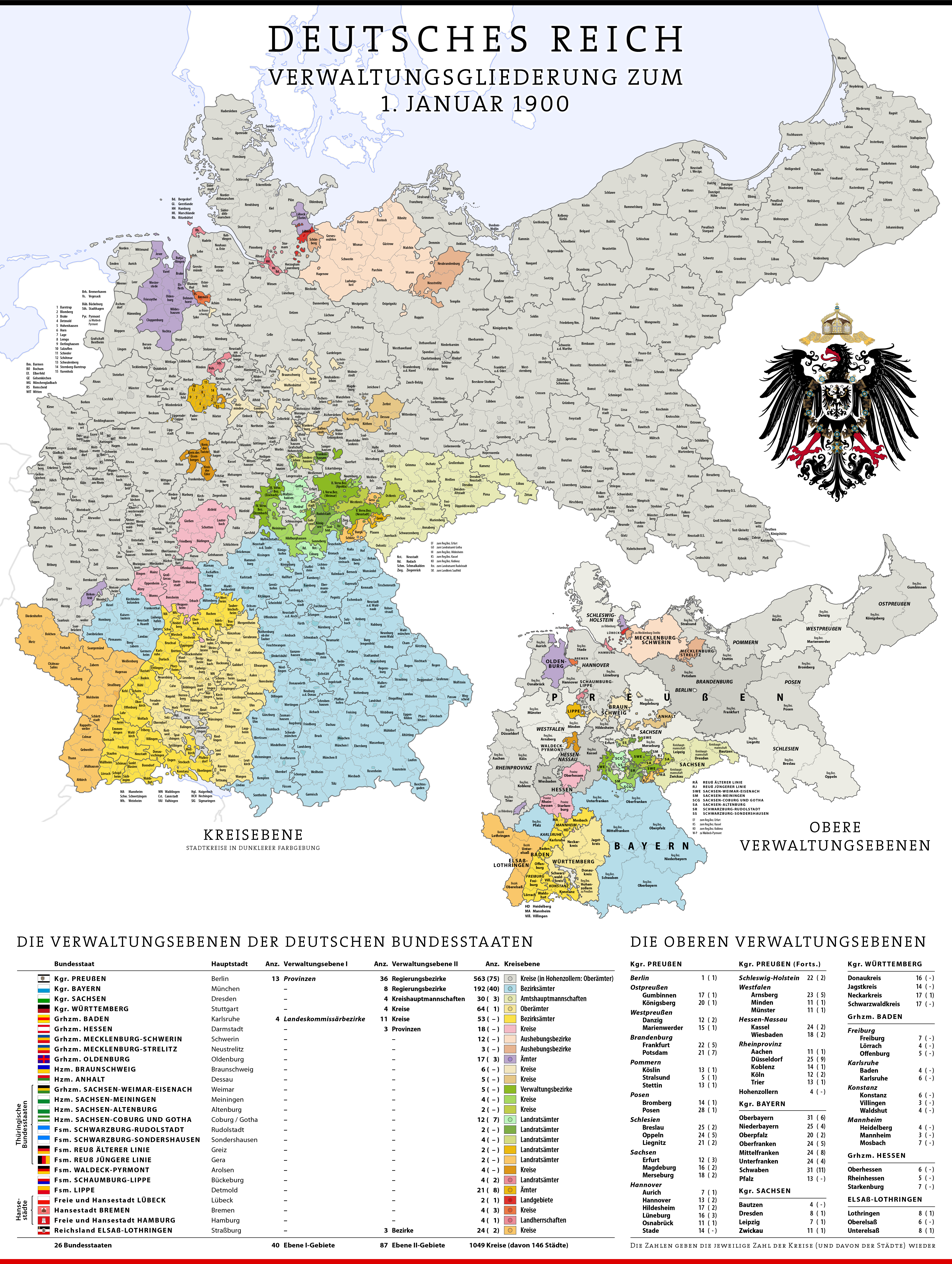
Administrative divisions of the German Empire on 1 January 1900

However, the seeds for future problems lay in a gross disparity between the imperial and Prussian systems. The empire granted the vote to all men over 25, although Prussia retained its three-class franchise, in which votes were weighted by taxes paid. Since the imperial chancellor was, except for two periods (January–November 1873 and 1892–1894), also prime minister of Prussia, this meant that for most of the empire's existence, the king/emperor and prime minister/chancellor had to seek majorities from legislatures elected by two completely different franchises.

At the time of the empire's creation, both Prussia and Germany were roughly two-thirds rural. Within 20 years, the situation was reversed; the cities and towns accounted for two-thirds of the population. However, in both the kingdom and the empire, the constituencies were never redrawn to reflect the growing population and influence of the cities and towns. This meant that rural areas were grossly overrepresented from the 1890s onward.

Bismarck realized that the rest of Europe was sceptical of his powerful new Reich, and turned his attention to preserving peace with such acts as the Congress of Berlin. The new German Empire improved its already-strong relations with Britain. The ties between London and Berlin had already been sealed in 1858, when Crown Prince Frederick William of Prussia married Victoria, Princess Royal.

William I died in 1888, and the Crown Prince succeeded to the throne as Frederick III. The new emperor, a decided Anglophile, planned to transform Prussia and the empire into a more liberal and democratic monarchy based on the British model. However, Frederick was already ill with inoperable throat cancer and died after only 99 days on the throne. He was succeeded by his 29-year-old son, William II. As a boy, William had rebelled against his parents' efforts to mould him as a liberal and had become thoroughly Prussianized under Bismarck's tutelage.

The new Kaiser William rapidly soured relations with the British and Russian royal families (despite being closely related to them), becoming their rival and ultimately their enemy. Before and during World War I (1914–1918), Prussia supplied significant numbers of soldiers and sailors in the German military, and Prussian Junkers dominated the higher ranks. In addition, portions of the Eastern Front were fought on Prussian soil. Prussia – along with Germany as a whole – experienced increasing troubles with revolutionaries during the war. The Great War ended by armistice on 11 November 1918.

Uprisings in Berlin and other centres began the civil conflict of the German revolution of 1918–1919 (German: Novemberrevolution). By late 1918, the Prussian House of Representatives was controlled by the Social Democratic Party of Germany (SPD), which advocated Marxism. William knew that he had lost his imperial crown for good, but still hoped to retain his Prussian crown; he believed that as ruler of two-thirds of Germany, he could remain a major figure in any successor regime. However, William discovered this was impossible under the imperial constitution. Although he believed he ruled the empire in personal union with Prussia, the imperial constitution stipulated that the imperial crown was tied to the Prussian crown. In any event, he had lost the support of the military, who might have fought for him. William's abdication as both king of Prussia and German emperor was announced on 9 November 1918, and he went into exile in the Netherlands the next day. With armed revolts, mass strikes, and street fighting in Berlin, the Prussian state government declared a state of siege and appealed for imperial military aid. The Guards Cavalry Rifle Division, commanded by Waldemar Pabst, moved against the strikers in Berlin. By the end of the fighting on 16 March, they had killed approximately 1,200 people, many of them unarmed and uninvolved. The revolutionary period lasted from November 1918 until the establishment in August 1919 of a republic that later became known as the Weimar Republic.

Prussia was incorporated as the Free State of Prussia into the Weimar Republic, gaining a new republican constitution in 1920. The state was abolished in 1947.

== State ==
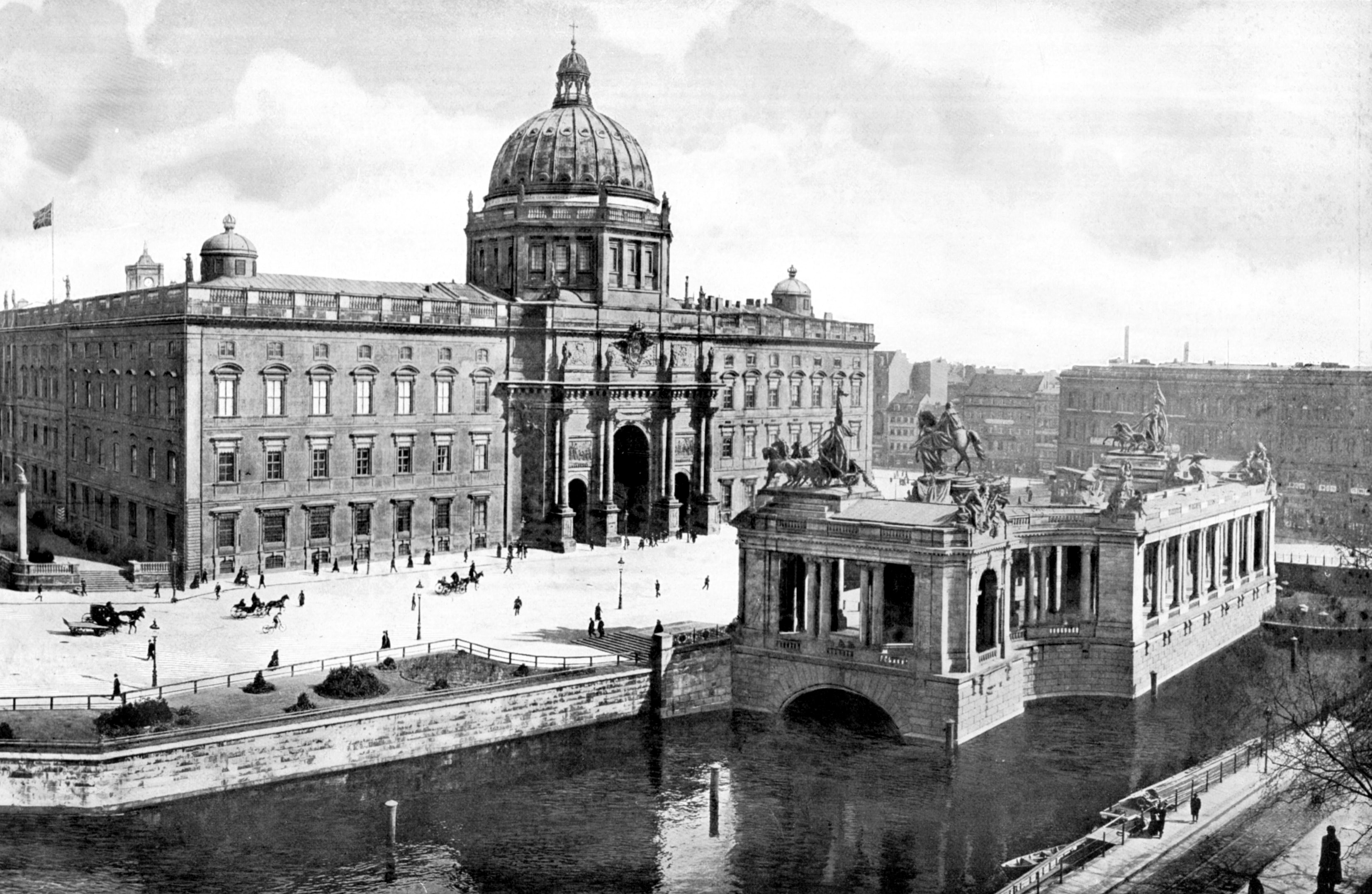
Berlin Palace, the main residence of the House of Hohenzollern

=== Government ===
The joint authority, feudal and bureaucratic, on which the Prussian absolute monarchy was based, saw its interests lay in the suppression of the drive for personal freedom and democratic rights. It therefore had to recourse on police methods. The "police state", as Otto Hintze described it, replaced the older system with its feudal squirearchy run in the interests of the ruling class, but which in its rudimentary form was a constitutional state.

=== Politics ===
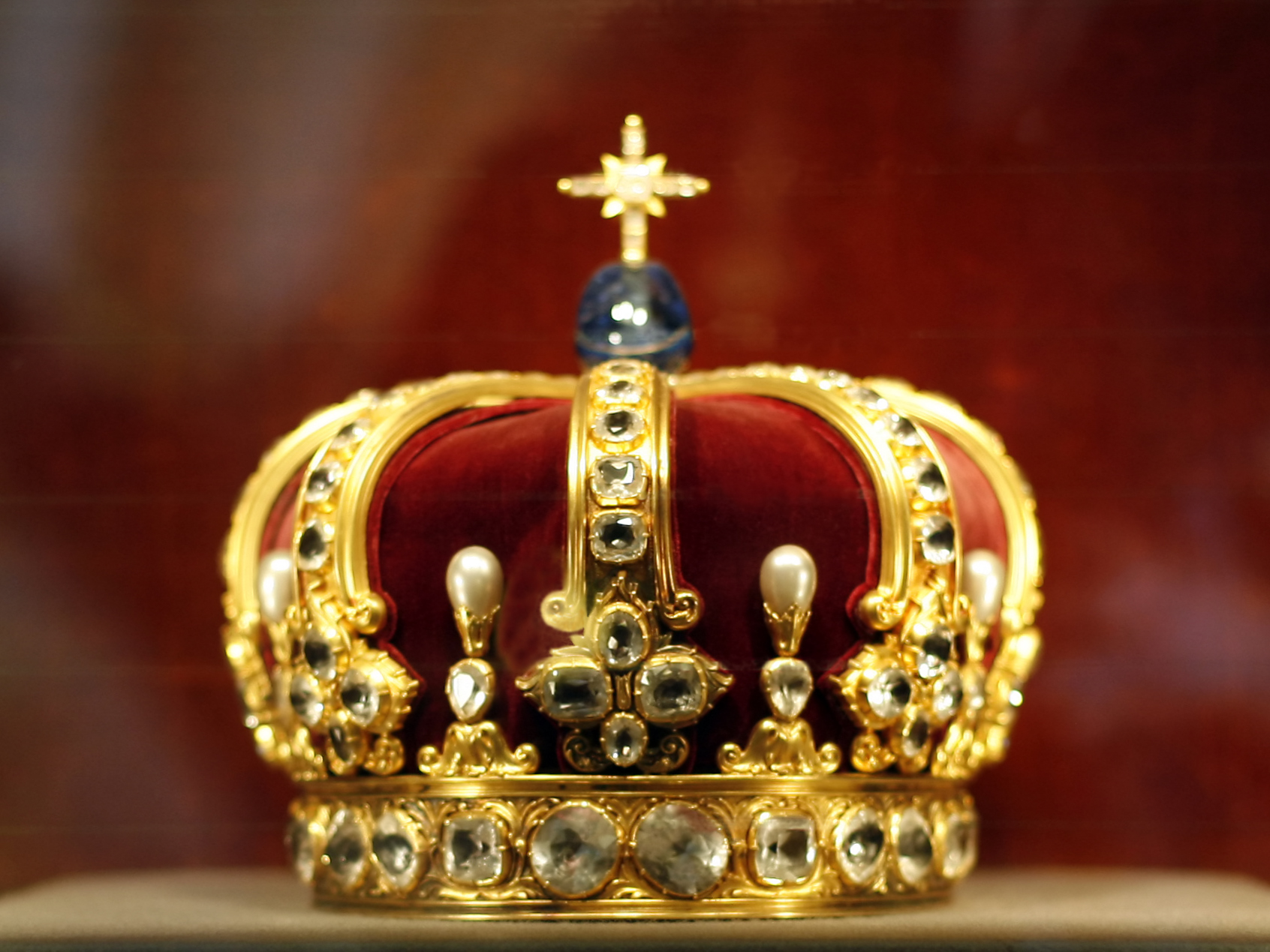
The Prussian King's Crown (Hohenzollern Castle Collection)

The Kingdom of Prussia was an absolute monarchy until the Revolutions of 1848 in the German states, after which Prussia became a constitutional monarchy and Adolf Heinrich von Arnim-Boitzenburg was appointed as Prussia's first Minister President. Following Prussia's first constitution, a two-house parliament was formed, called the Landtag. The lower house, or Prussian House of Representatives, was elected by all males over the age of 25 using the Prussian three-class franchise introduced in the Constitution of 1850, which assured dominance by the more well-to-do elements of the population. The upper house, which was later renamed the Prussian House of Lords, was appointed by the king. He retained full executive authority and ministers were responsible only to him. As a result, the grip of the landowning classes, the Prussian Junkers, remained unbroken, especially in the eastern provinces. Prussian Secret Police, formed in response to the German revolutions of 1848–1849, aided the conservative government.

=== Constitutions ===
There were two constitutions during the kingdom's existence, those of 1848 and 1850. The first was granted by the reluctant Frederick William IV in response to demands that arose during the German revolutions of 1848–1849. Elections were called in early 1848 for a Prussian National Assembly, with all males 25 and older able to vote. King Frederick William IV and his ministers presented a draft constitution in which the king retained many of his old rights. The Assembly responded with the "Charte Waldeck" which included an expanded list of fundamental rights, a Volkswehr ("people's guard") responsible to parliament and restrictions on feudal rights. The King declared to his ministers that "he would never accept [it] under any conditions". On 9 November, he adjourned the Assembly and on 5 December 1848 unilaterally imposed the Constitution of 1848. It contained a significant number of liberal elements from the Charte Waldeck, including a parliament with two chambers, the introduction of jury courts, certain limitations on the monarch's powers and a mandate to ensure legal certainty. It also guaranteed many fundamental rights such as freedom of speech, the press and religion.

In spite of the constitution's liberal clauses, Prussia was still far from a democratic state. The king had an absolute veto over laws, which restricted the separation of powers. It was possible for the monarch to circumvent the judiciary, and the military could be described as a state within the state. All adult male citizens, regardless of class, had the right to vote, but the Prussian three-class franchise that weighted votes based on the amount of taxes paid significantly limited the political voice of the middle and lower classes.

The 1850 Constitution of Prussia was an amended version of the 1848 Constitution. Unlike the earlier version, the 1850 revision was a cooperative effort between the new Prussian Parliament, the King and his ministers. The changes they made to the 1848 Constitution were mostly of a minor nature. The king remained in a position of dominance over the three branches of government, and parliament had no control over the military, but the liberal elements introduced in the 1848 Constitution remained largely in place.

The 1850 Constitution, frequently amended, was the fundamental law of Prussia until the end of the German Empire in 1918.

== Religion ==
The Prussian Constitution of 1850 allowed for freedom of conscience, freedom of public and private worship and freedom of association with religious bodies. It stated that all churches and other religious associations should administer everything independently and privately from the state and that no part of the government may affect the Church. The constitution also stated that all children should be taught their religion from people of their own religion and not by someone else.

According to a census taken in the early- to mid-1800s, there was a division of six religions around the 1830s: this was, per million inhabitants, 609,427.0 practising Protestants, 376,177.1 practising Catholics, 13,348.8 practising Jews, 925.1 Mennonites, 121.4 Greek Orthodox and 0.6 Muslims. At this time, the total population was 14,098,125 people, meaning there were approximately 8,591,778 practising Protestants, 5,303,392 practising Catholics, 188,193 practising Jews, 13,042 Mennonites, 1,712 Greek Orthodox, and 8 Muslims.

Although dominated by Protestant Lutherans (along with some Calvinists), it contained millions of Catholics in the west and in Poland. There were numerous Catholic populations in the Rhineland and parts of Westphalia. In addition, West Prussia, Warmia, Silesia, and the province of Posen had predominantly Catholic Polish-speaking populations. East Prussia's southern region of Masuria was mostly made up of Germanised Protestant Masurs.

== Ethnicity ==
Apart from ethnic Germans, the country was also inhabited by ethnolinguistic minorities. Minority groups included Poles (including Kashubs in West Prussia and Mazurs in East Prussia), Prussian Lithuanians (in East Prussia), Sorbs (in Lusatia), Czechs and Moravians (in Silesia), Danes (in Schleswig), Jews, Frisians, Dutch, Walloons, Russians (in Wojnowo (Eckertsdorf)), French, Italians, Hungarians and others.

== Subdivisions ==
The original core regions of the Kingdom of Prussia were the Margraviate of Brandenburg and the Duchy of Prussia, which together formed Brandenburg-Prussia. A Further Pomeranian province had been held by Prussia since 1653. Combined with Swedish Pomerania, gained from Sweden in 1720 and 1815, this region formed the Province of Pomerania. Prussian gains in the Silesian Wars led to the formation of the Province of Silesia in 1740.

After the First Partition of Poland in 1772, the newly annexed Royal Prussia and Warmia became the Province of West Prussia, while the Duchy of Prussia (along with part of Warmia) became the Province of East Prussia. Other annexations along the Noteć (Netze) River became the Netze District. Following the second and third partitions (1793–1795), the new Prussian annexations became the provinces of New Silesia, South Prussia, and New East Prussia, with the Netze District redivided between West and South Prussia. All the acquired Polish lands remained outside of the Holy Roman Empire, and the latter three provinces were disentangled from Prussia following the Treaties of Tilsit to be included in the Napoleonic Grand Duchy of Warsaw in 1806, and were ultimately lost to Congress Poland after the Congress of Vienna in 1815, except for the western part of South Prussia, which would form part of the Grand Duchy of Posen, the latter however also remained outside of German Confederation, the successor of the dissolved Holy Roman Empire, as did the province of East Prussia and the province of West Prussia.

Following the major western gains made by Prussia after the Vienna Congress, a total of ten provinces were established, each one subdivided further into smaller administrative regions known as Regierungsbezirke. The provinces were:

- Province of Brandenburg
- Province of East Prussia (outside of German Confederation)
- Province of Jülich-Cleves-Berg
- Grand Duchy of the Lower Rhine
- Province of Pomerania
- Grand Duchy of Posen (autonomous, outside of German Confederation)
- Province of Saxony
- Province of Silesia
- Province of West Prussia (outside of German Confederation)
- Province of Westphalia

In 1822, the provinces of Jülich-Cleves-Berg and the Lower Rhine were merged to form the Rhine Province. In 1829, the provinces of East and West Prussia merged to form the Province of Prussia, but the separate provinces were reformed in 1878. The principalities of Hohenzollern-Sigmaringen and Hohenzollern-Hechingen were annexed in 1850 to form the Province of Hohenzollern.

After Prussia's victory in the 1866 Austro-Prussian War, territories annexed by Prussia were reorganised into three new provinces:

- Province of Hanover
- Province of Hesse-Nassau
- Province of Schleswig-Holstein
The ten provinces of the Kingdom of Prussia, after the Congress of Vienna. The other member states of the German Confederation are shown in beige. The Principality of Neuchâtel in the south-west was under Prussian administration until 1848.

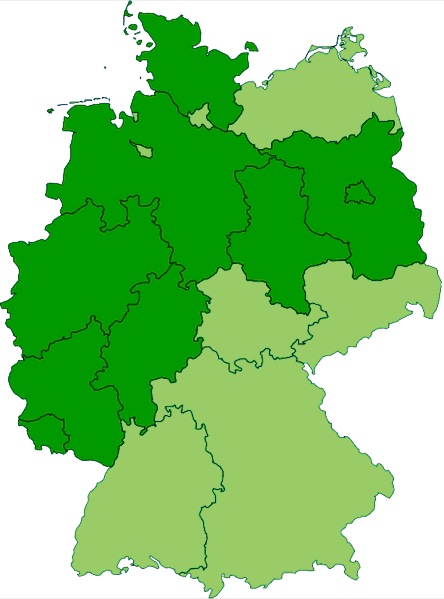
Map of the current states of Germany (in dark green) that are completely or mostly situated inside the old borders of Imperial Germany's Kingdom of Prussia

== Bibliography ==
- Hintze, Otto. Der Commissarius und seine Bedeutung in der allgemeinen Verwaltungsgeschichte.
- Jacoby, Henry (1 January 1973). The Bureaucratization of the World. University of California Press. ISBN 978-0-520-02083-2.
