= Prussian House of Representatives =

Lower chamber of the Prussian Landtag (1850–1918)

Prussian House of Representatives Preußisches Abgeordnetenenhaus
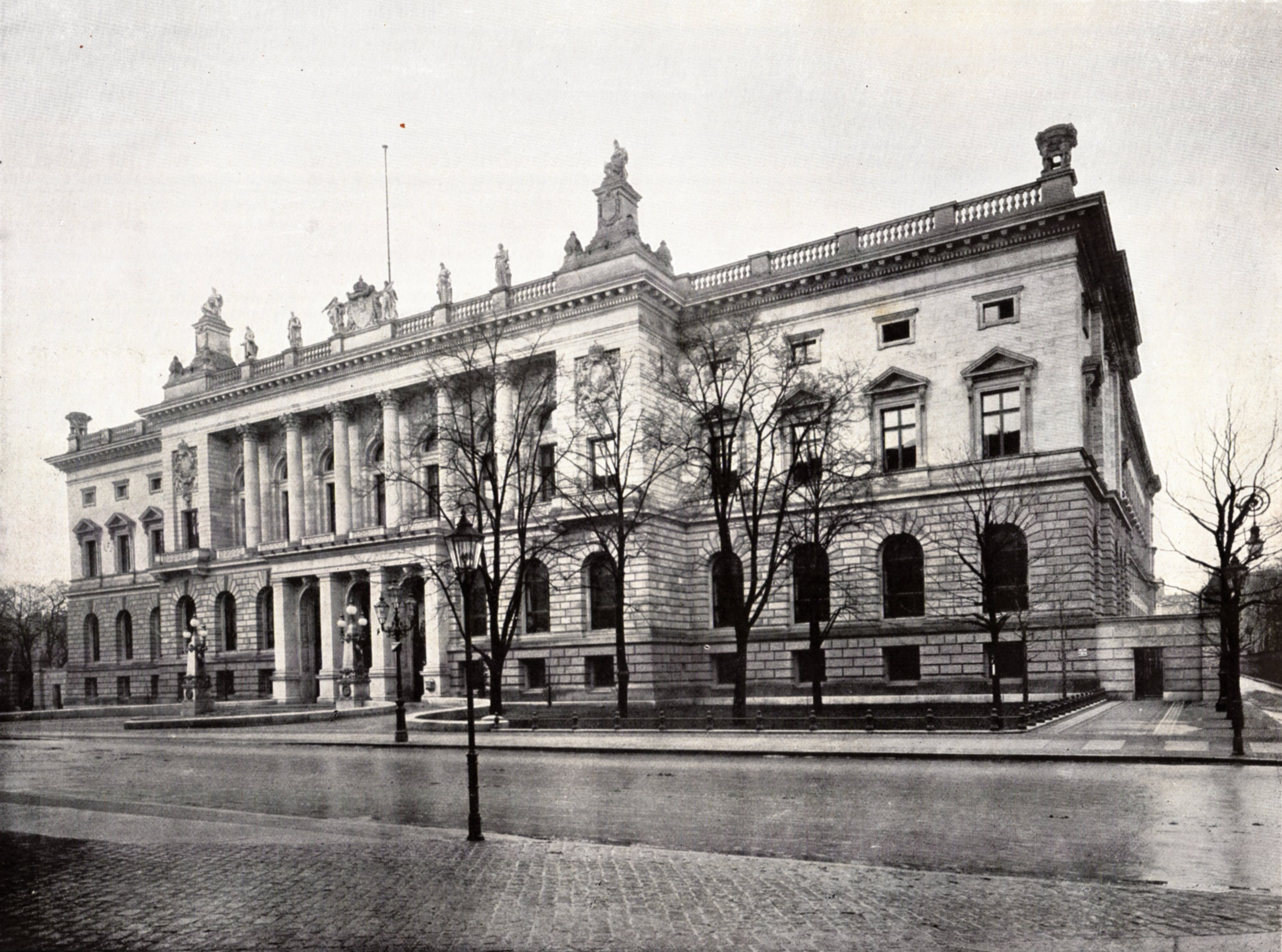
- Façade on Prinz-Albrecht-Straße, c. 1900

Type
- Type: Lower house

History
- Established: 5 December 1848
- Disbanded: 15 November 1918
- Preceded by: Prussian estates Prussian National Assembly
- Succeeded by: Prussian Landtag

Elections
- Voting system: Three-class franchise

Constitution
- Constitution of Prussia (1848); Constitution of Prussia (1850)

The Prussian House of Representatives (German: Preußisches Abgeordnetenhaus) was the lower chamber of the Landtag of Prussia (German: Preußischer Landtag), the parliament of Prussia from 1850 to 1918. Together with the upper house, the House of Lords (German: Preußisches Herrenhaus), it formed the Prussian bicameral legislature. The Prussian House of Representatives was established by the Prussian constitution of 5 December 1848, with members elected according to the three-class franchise. At first it was called simply the "Second Chamber," with the name "House of Representatives" (Abgeordnetenhaus) introduced in 1855.

== Franchise ==
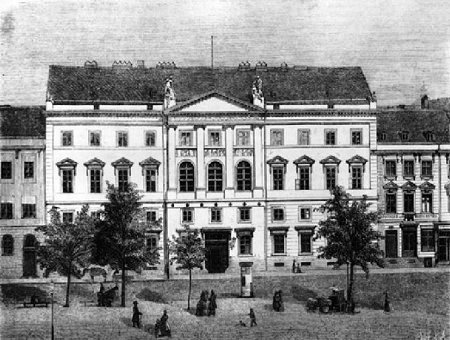
Palais Hardenberg, Berlin: seat of the House of Representatives until 1899 at Dönhoffplatz

From 1849, the election of representatives within the Kingdom of Prussia was performed according to the three-class franchise system. The election was indirect. In the primary election, those with the right to vote went to the ballot and, in three separate classes, chose electors, who, in turn, chose the representatives for their constituency.

Several attempts to reform the voting procedure, which heavily favoured the Conservatives, were rebuffed by the House of Lords. The electoral law, which was one of the most progressive in Europe when it was introduced, thus stayed mostly unchanged until 1918. The House of Representatives itself decided to abolish it in 1918, but it had become redundant by the German Revolution of 1918–1919, which founded a republic.

The right to vote was open to every male Prussian over 24 years of age who had been living in a Prussian municipality for at least six months and had not been stripped of his rights by a court of law and was not in receipt of public pauper relief. To stand for election as a representative, one had to be over 30, be a Prussian for at least three years and not be stripped of civil rights by a court.

== Legislative periods ==
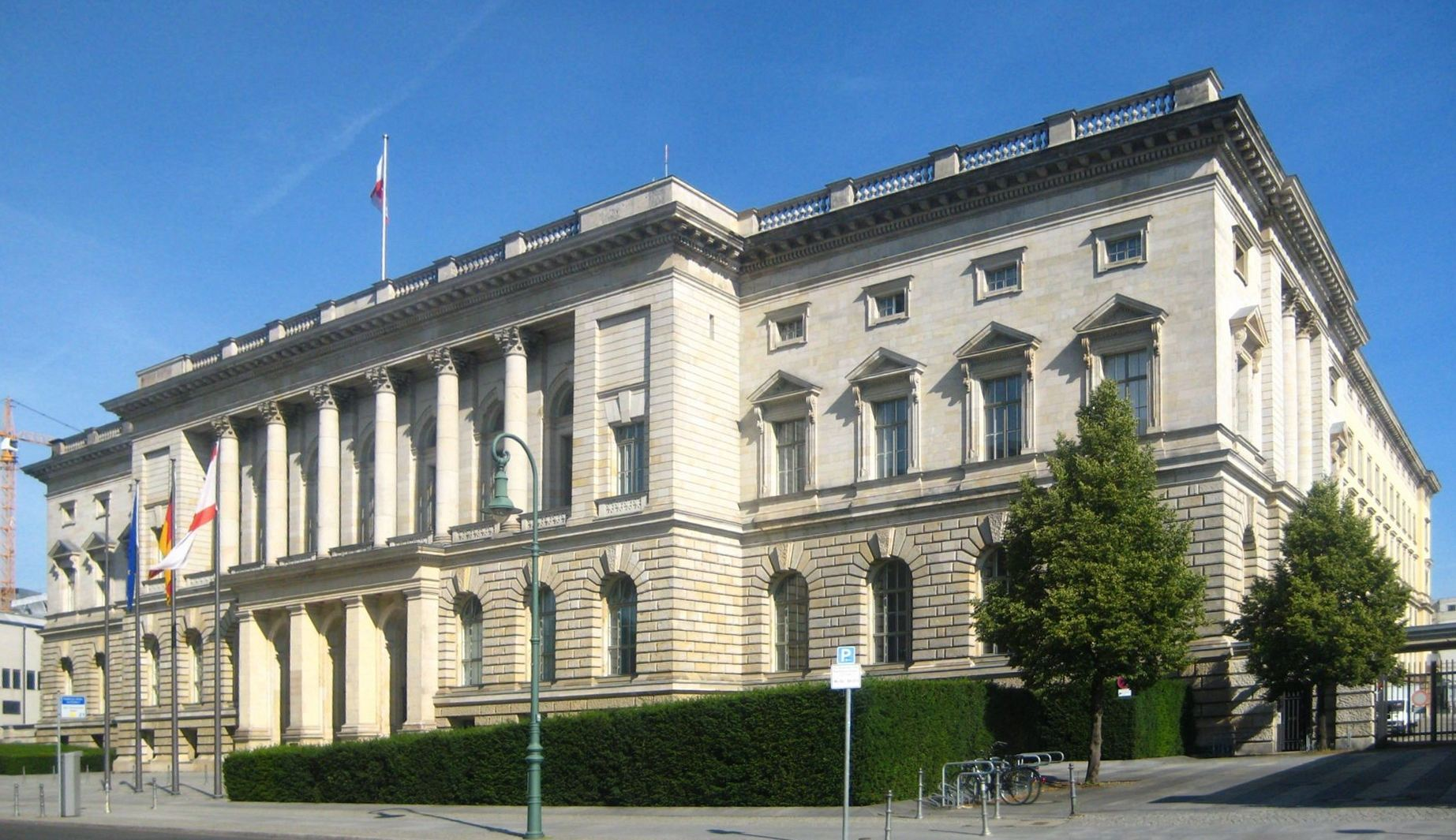
The House of Representatives today: The building is now used by the Berlin state legislature at Niederkirchnerstraße

The legislative period was at first three years, but, as for the Reichstag, it was changed to five years in 1888. The House was, however, dissolved by the king prematurely several times. From 1849 to 1918, there were 22 legislative periods.

== Composition ==
Its size was first fixed at 350 seats, which changed to 352 with the incorporation of Hohenzollern-Sigmaringen and Hohenzollern-Hechingen in 1849. Following annexations after the Austro-Prussian War of 1866, the number of seats changed to 432 after the election of 1867. In 1876, another seat for the Duchy of Lauenburg was added. In 1906, ten seats were added, bringing the number to 443 for the elections of 1908.

The members of the House received monetary compensation for their work, unlike (until 1906) the members of the Reichstag. Therefore, many Reichstag members also sat in the House of Representatives. In 1903, 110 members of the Reichstag were likewise members of the Prussian House, that is, almost half of the House of Representatives' 236 seats. After 1906, the number of dual office-holders sank significantly, to only 45 in 1913.

From 1862, there was a clear liberal majority in the House. In the Prussian constitutional crisis of 1859–66, however, the Liberals were defeated by chancellor Otto von Bismarck. After the war of 1866, the National Liberals split from the Liberals, and the latter never regained their former strength.

The distribution of seats from 1867, at the beginning of the respective legislative period:

	1867	1870	1873	1876	1879	1882	1885	1888	1893	1898	1903	1908	1913
Conservatives	123	114	9	12	106	116	134	129	142	145	143	151	149
New Conservatives		(34)^{1}	25	25									
Free Conservatives	54	50	35	34	57	58	62	64	63	58	61	59	53
Centre		52	88	88	97	98	100	99	95	100	96	104	103
National Liberals	97	111	174	175	103	69	70	88	90	73	78	66	73
Liberal Union					(17)^{2}	20	43^{3}	29^{3}					
Progress Party	45	48	69	67	36	37	43^{3}	29^{3}					
Free-minded People's Party									14	24	24	28	41^{4}
Free-minded Union									6	12	9	8	41^{4}
Social Democrats												7	10
Poland party	16	19	17	15	19	18	15	15	17	13	13	15	12
Danes	2	2	2	2	2	2	2	2	2	2	2	2	2
Right centre	24												
Left centre	32												
Independent	39	36	13	15	13	15	7	7	4	6	7	3	
Total	432	432	432	433	433	433	433	433	433	433	433	443	443

Notes: ^{1} Split from the conservatives; ^{2} Split from the National Liberals; ^{3} German Free-minded Party; ^{4} Progressive People's Party (Germany)

== Presidents ==
Tenure	Name
1849, 1862–1866	Wilhelm Grabow
1866–1873	Max von Forckenbeck
1873–1879	Rudolf von Bennigsen
1879–1897	Georg von Köller
1898–1911	Jordan von Kröcher
1912	Hermann von Erffa
1913–1918	Hans Graf von Schwerin-Löwitz

== Dissolution ==
The House of Representatives was dissolved on 15 November 1918 by the Prussian revolutionary cabinet led by Social Democrats and Independent Social Democrats. On 24 November 1918, the vice-president of the House of Representatives, Dr. Felix Porsch, spoke in protest against the dissolution in one of the body's final acts. Under the 1920 Constitution of the Free State of Prussia, the former House of Representatives was replaced by the Prussian Landtag.
