= Prussian three-class franchise =

Electoral grouping by taxes in Prussia (1848–1918)

The Prussian three-class franchise (German: Preußisches Dreiklassenwahlrecht) was an indirect electoral system used from 1848 until 1918 in the Kingdom of Prussia and for shorter periods in other German states. Voters were grouped by district into three classes, with the total tax payments in each class equal. Those who paid the most in taxes formed the first class, followed by the next highest in the second, with those who paid the least in the third. Voters in each class separately elected one third of the electors who in turn voted for the representatives. Voting was not secret. The franchise was a form of apportionment by economic class rather than geographic area or population.

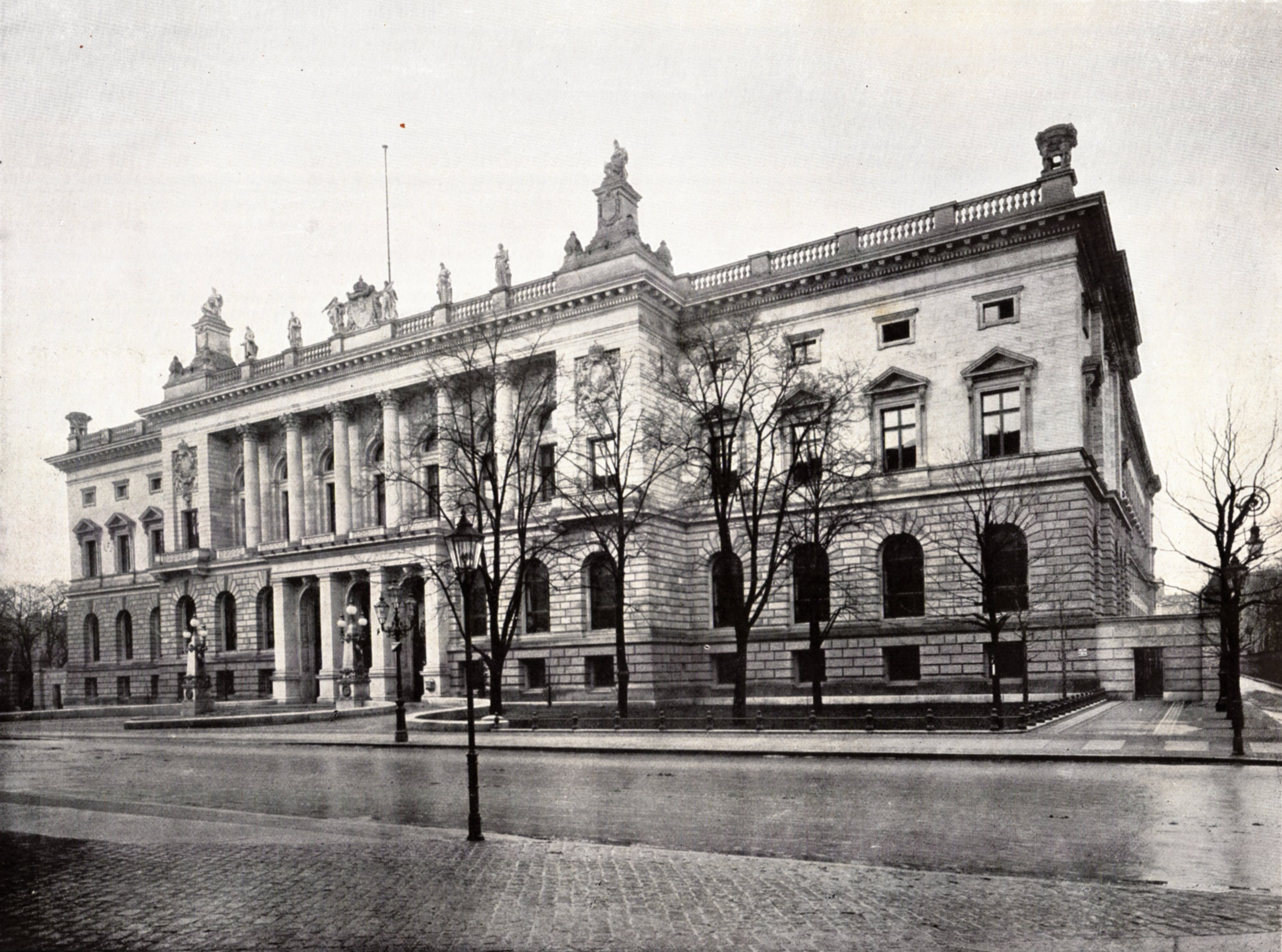
Prussian House of Representatives in 1900.

Members of the Prussian House of Representatives were elected according to the three-class electoral law, as were the city councils of Prussian cities and towns in accordance with the Prussian Municipal Code. After decades of controversy and failed attempts at reform, which for many caused the Prussian three-class franchise to become a hated symbol of Prussia's democratic shortfalls, it was finally abolished early in the German Revolution of 1918–1919 that broke out following Germany's defeat in World War I.

Even though there were considerable differences between districts in the tax levels at which the cutoffs between classes were made, the system tended to favor conservatives and rural areas over left liberals and cities. Voter turnout was also significantly lower under three-class voting than it was in elections for the German Reichstag, which did not use the system. Despite the diminished weight of many votes, the three class franchise did have the advantage of allowing all males to vote, which many contemporaneous electoral systems in other German states and European countries did not do.

== Legal basis ==
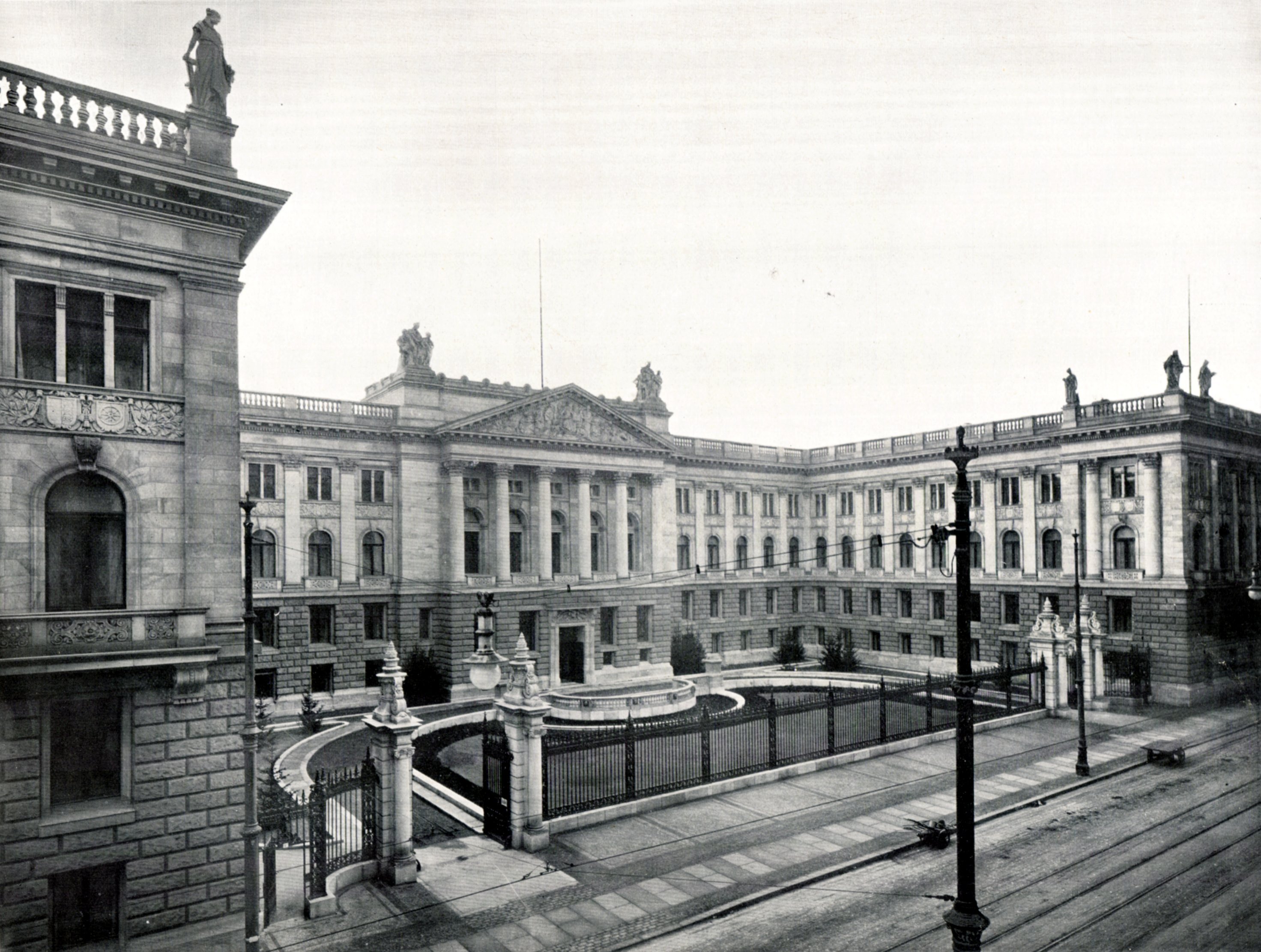
Prussian House of Lords in 1900.

The legal basis for the three-class electoral system was the "Ordinance on Conducting the Election of Deputies to the Second Chamber" of 30 May 1849 and the "Regulations on Conducting Elections to the House of Deputies", which was issued for the implementation of the 30 May ordinance and then repeatedly amended. The three-class electoral system was made part of the revised Prussian constitution of 31 January 1850 (paragraph 71).

With only one paragraph added to it before 1918, the ordinance remained fundamentally unchanged for the duration of its use. It was, however, partially invalidated several times or replaced by new regulations. In 1860 the electoral districts and polling places were set by law. In 1891 and 1893 the formation of electoral classes was reformed, and in 1906 some minor changes were introduced to streamline the electoral process.

== Election procedures ==
=== Eligibility to vote ===
Every Prussian male who had reached the age of 25 and had lived in a Prussian municipality for at least six months was eligible to vote. He could not have lost his civil rights through a legal judgment or be receiving public assistance for the poor. Under paragraph 49 of the Reich Military Act of 1874 (Reichs-Militärgesetz), active military personnel, with the exception of military officers, were excluded from the right to vote both in the federal states and for the Reichstag.

=== The three classes ===
Those eligible to vote were divided into three classes based on the revenue from direct state taxes (class tax or classified income tax, property tax and business tax).

Within each district, the eligible voters who paid the most taxes fell into the first class. The top taxpaying eligible voters were assigned to this class until one third of the total tax revenue was reached. Then those who paid the most taxes among the remaining eligible voters were put into the second class until one-third of the total tax revenue was again reached. All remaining eligible voters – who also contributed one-third of total taxes – formed the third class.

If the tax paid by a voter placed him partially in the first and partially the second class, he was allocated to the first. The tax amount of the first class would then exceed one third of the total taxes, with the result that the amount attributable to the second and third classes was recalculated by dividing the remaining amount equally between those two classes.

Eligible voters elected from 3 to 6 electors in their primary district. Each district provided one elector for each 250 inhabitants according to the latest census. A primary electoral district thus had a minimum of 750 and a maximum of 1,749 inhabitants.

In municipalities with several primary election districts it was possible that after the class allocation procedure there were no eligible voters at all in the first or even in the first and second classes. In such cases, the allocation was carried out again at the level of the individual electoral district. In 1908, in 2,214 of 29,028 primary election districts, the first class consisted of only one person. In 1888, in 2,283 of 22,749 primary election districts there was only one eligible voter in class one; in another 1,764 there were two eligible voters, and in 96 primary election districts there was also only one eligible voter in the second class.

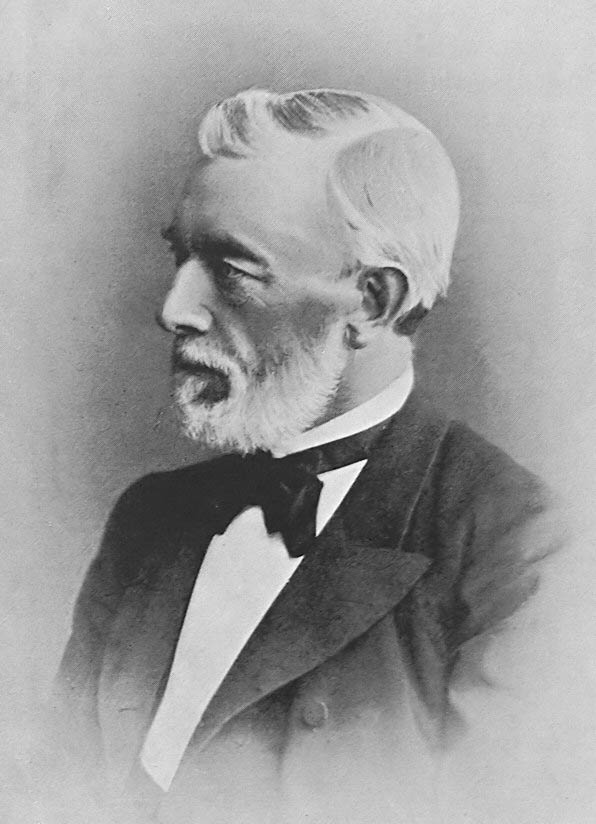
Johannes von Miquel

In 1891 and 1893 the allocation of eligible voters into classes was restructured as a result of the far-reaching tax reforms introduced under Prussian Finance Minister Johannes von Miquel. Land, building and businesses taxes became municipal rather than state taxes. A progressive income tax replaced the class tax and the classified income tax; in addition, a supplementary tax (wealth tax) was introduced as a direct state tax.

The progressive income tax rates and supplementary tax placed a heavier burden on wealthy citizens, with the result that even fewer men would have been allocated to the first and second classes. To prevent this, an amount of three marks was applied to each voter who did not pay income tax. Voters who paid no other direct tax beyond the fictitious three marks always fell into the third class. Direct municipal taxes were henceforth also taken into account along with direct state taxes when calculating classes.

Where no municipal taxes were levied, the taxes that would have been due under previous law continued to be taken into account as a fictitious amount. This was a de facto protection clause for landlords in municipality-free manor districts. There were no municipal taxes since landowners would have paid them to themselves. Until then, landowners paid a considerable amount of tax on land but often little on income. Without the credit of notional municipal taxes, some landowners could have slipped into the second class.

Another significant change for cities in 1891 was that the division into classes was always carried out at the level of the primary election district. Until then, in municipalities divided into several primary election districts, the required tax amount for the first or second class was the same in all primary election districts (unless a class had remained unoccupied in this way). That changed in 1891, in some cases drastically. In 1888, for example, 494 marks were required for the first class in Cologne in all primary election districts. If the division into thirds had been carried out under the new rules at the level of the original election districts, the amount would have varied between 18 and 24,896 marks. After the change, the amount required in 1893 for the first class in Berlin varied between twelve marks in the poorest original electoral district and 27,000 marks in Voßstrasse (where the Reich Chancellery was located). The change made it both easier for many urban citizens with low and middle incomes to move up to the second or even first class and for wealthy citizens in rich primary election districts to slip into the third class; Reich Chancellor Bernhard von Bülow had to vote in the third class in 1903.

The share of voters in the classes fluctuated over time and also regionally. Nationwide, the third class accounted for about 80 to 85 percent of eligible voters, and the first class for about 4%. In 1913, the third class accounted for 79.8% of eligible voters (down from 85.3% in 1898), the second class for 15.8% (up from 11.4% in 1898), and the first class for 4.4% (up from 3.3% in 1898).

In 1913 there were 190,444 primary electoral votes statewide in the first class and 1,990,262 in the third class. Since both classes elected the same number of electors, the votes of first class primary voters had a weight 10.45 times greater than those of third class voters.

=== Election of electors (primary election) ===
Choosing electors took place in a meeting of the primary voters on a day that was uniform throughout the state. The election was held separately by classes. If there was a total of three electors to be chosen, each class elected one; if there were six, each elected two. If there were four electors to be chosen, the first and third classes each elected one and the second class two; if there were 5 electors to be chosen, the first and third classes each elected two and the second class elected only one. An elector had to be eligible to vote in the primary election district but did not have to be a member of the class in which he was elected.

The third class voted first, the first last. Voting was not secret. When voting was completed in a class, its voters, unless they were members of the electoral board, had to leave the polling station. The voters of the first class could observe the voting behavior of all voters, those of the second could observe the third, while the voters of the third class did not know how the higher classes voted.

Voters were called one after the other in descending order of their tax payments. The voter named one or two candidates depending on the number of electors to be chosen in the class. An absolute majority of those voting was required for election. If an absolute majority was not achieved, those men not yet elected who had the most votes were placed on a runoff ballot, twice as many of them as there were electors still to be elected. In most cases the electors won by a large majority.

Those men elected had to declare their acceptance or rejection of the election immediately, if present, otherwise within three days, including election day. If an elector who was not present rejected the results, a by-election was held a few days later.

In 1906, in cities with a population of 50,000 or more, the electoral assembly was replaced by the time-limit voting that is now common practice, allowing voters to cast their ballots within a specified period of time.

=== Electoral districts (constituencies) ===
The electors of a constituency gathered on a uniform national day at a polling place in their constituency, established by law in 1860, to elect members of parliament. Usually there were several hundred electors in a constituency, in some cases well over 1,000. One to three deputies were elected in each constituency, although before 1860 there were constituencies with more. In 1860, 176 electoral districts were established by law. The electoral districts always comprised one or more entire city or county districts; only Berlin was divided into several electoral districts.

Apart from minor shifts in district boundaries, there was only one change to these constituencies before a law of 1906 that was effective with the 1908 election. Under its terms, several constituencies with particularly large population growth were divided into smaller constituencies and a total of 10 additional seats were allocated to these areas (Greater Berlin 5, Ruhr 4, and Upper Silesia 1). Otherwise, the only changes in constituency division were additional constituencies for areas annexed to Prussia after the Austro-Prussian War of 1866 (Hanover, Hesse-Nassau, and Schleswig-Holstein in 1867, and Lauenburg in 1876). In the long term, a trend toward more single-member constituencies can be observed:

Electoral Districts by Number of Representatives	1861	1867	1876	1885	1888	1908
1 Representative	27	105	106	104	105	132
2 Representatives	122	123	123	124	125	121
3 Representatives	27	27	27	27	26	23
Total Electoral Districts	176	255	256	255	256	276
Total Seats	352	432	433	433	433	443

The classes, which were only minimally adjusted for population changes, further favored the conservatives, since their deputies came mainly from eastern and rural parts of the country with low population growth.

=== Election of deputies ===
Unlike in the primary elections, the classes played no role in the election of deputies. If several deputies were to be elected, a separate vote was held for each seat. An absolute majority of votes was required for election. If this was not achieved, a runoff took place. Until 1903 all candidates who received more than one vote on the first ballot were allowed to participate in the second ballot. In each subsequent ballot, the candidate with the fewest votes was eliminated. If there was a tie between the two remaining candidates, the decision was made by drawing lots. Beginning in 1903, a runoff election of the two candidates with the most votes was held immediately, as in the primary elections. If two candidates each received exactly half of the votes on the first ballot, the decision was made by lot from 1906 onward; until then, a runoff also took place in such a case. In order to streamline the rather time-consuming election of deputies, from 1903 the electors cast their votes at one time if more than one deputy was to be elected, i.e. they had to indicate who they wanted to vote for the first, second and, if applicable, third seat. More than 90% of the deputies were elected on the first ballot.

== Effects ==
Prussia (blue-shaded areas) in 1914.

The electoral procedure combined with the use of classes in the constituencies strongly favored conservatives. In 1913 the German Conservative Party received 14.8% of the primary electorate votes but won 149 of the 443 seats (33.6%) in the Prussian House of Representatives; the Free Conservative Party won 53 seats (12%) with only 2% of the primary electorate votes. The Social Democratic Party of Germany (SPD) on the other hand won only 10 seats (2.3%) in 1913 with 28.4% of the voters. Measured in terms of share of the vote, the Centre Party, National Liberal Party and parties of the liberal left tended to be favored by the electoral law, although by no means to the same extent as the conservatives. Voting by party was recorded statistically in elections only from 1898 onward and was determined by the electoral officer entering the presumed political orientation of each person who received a vote in the primary election. Because of this, vote shares are only approximations. It should also be noted that the discrepancy between vote shares and mandate shares among the Conservatives and Free Conservatives resulted not only from the electoral law itself, but also from the fact that voter turnout was usually particularly low in their strongholds.

Compared to the voting rights for the German Reichstag, those for the Prussian House of Representatives were especially favorable for the Conservatives, Free Conservatives and National Liberals. It was disadvantageous for Poles (the Polish National Democratic Party represented the Polish minority in Germany) and especially the SPD. In 1903 the SPD won 32 of the 236 Prussian seats in the Reichstag, but in the same year none of the 433 seats in the election to the Prussian House of Representatives.

Voter turnout in all three classes was far below that in Reichstag elections. In 1913 it was 32.7% (in 1898 only 18.4%), whereas in the 1912 Reichstag election Prussian turnout was 84.5%. The possible reasons are many: the election was always held on a weekday and, unlike in a Reichstag election, voting could take several hours. In the countryside a long trek to a neighboring municipality may have been necessary, whereas in Reichstag elections there was always at least one polling station in each municipality. The lack of secrecy in voting and thus possible negative consequences from casting a vote could also deter eligible voters. For voters in the third class, the relatively low importance of their votes could also have played a role. In many cases, the importance of the primary election was also diminished by the fact that the primary constituency or the entire constituency was politically without controversy and the winner already all but determined before the voting. Voter turnout was particularly low in the third class, where it was only 29.9% statewide in 1913, compared to 41.9% in the second class and 51.4% in the first class. Voter turnout was particularly high in areas with a large Polish population and in Berlin, while in the rest of Prussia the already low average figure was in some cases considerably undercut. Turnout was higher in cities than in rural areas. The historian Thomas Kühne, a specialist in the three-class electoral system, speaks of the "economy of abstention". Voters, he said, did not stay away from the polls in protest against the restrictive electoral law, but because they could agree in advance who would vote – and it was sufficient if only a few cast ballots.

Average tax revenue per eligible voter (in gold marks) in the Prussian provinces by tax division (1898)
Province	First class	Second class	Third class	Total
East Prussia	485	139	15	42
West Prussia	559	147	17	48
City district Berlin	2,739	445	44	124
Brandenburg	635	168	21	56
Pomerania	608	147	16	46
Posen	395	83	11	32
Silesia	546	113	15	45
Saxony	724	181	21	59
Schleswig-Holstein	654	208	23	63
Hanover	469	149	18	49
Westphalia	662	146	22	59
Hesse-Nassau	589	163	27	72
Rhine Province	733	170	24	67
Province of Hohenzollern	61	24	6	14
Total Prussia	671	165	21	59

Since tax revenues in Prussia varied greatly from region to region, the cutoffs for voting in the first or second class also varied considerably from province to province and even between the various electoral districts of a larger municipality. In the Prussian state election of 1898, an average of 1,361 marks had to be paid in direct taxes in the city and only 343 marks in the countryside to qualify to vote in the first class. The average tax paid by a Berlin voter in the second class in the 1898 state election was 445 marks, while that of a corresponding voter in the Province of Hohenzollern, a part of Prussia in far southern Germany, was 24 marks. The differences were even more pronounced when comparing different primary election districts. In 29 particularly high-tax Berlin electoral districts, voters were classed in the third class up to a tax revenue of 3,000 marks per year, while in four low-tax districts, a tax revenue of 100 marks per year was sufficient to qualify for the first class. In some cases, even high-ranking Prussian state officials had to vote in the third class. Of ten Prussian state ministers, six, including Prussian Prime Minister Botho zu Eulenburg and Reich Chancellor and Prussian Minister Leo von Caprivi, voted in the third class in the Prussian state election of 1893. Three other ministers voted in the second class while the tenth minister, the Minister of War, was ineligible to vote as an active military man.

== Reform efforts and abolition ==
While conservative forces rejected changes to Prussia's three-class system, left-wing liberals and especially the SPD regularly demanded that the national Reichstag's voting requirements be adopted by Prussia. Especially by the turn of the century, the Prussian electoral law had come to be considered outdated and was criticized from all sides. Not only Social Democrats took to the streets against the electoral law, but progressive citizens also opposed it in petitions. The National Liberals, for example, called for plural suffrage, under which certain people may vote more than once, on the model of Belgium and Saxony. In addition, the National Liberals along with the Centre Party asked for direct suffrage and a redrawing of constituencies to reflect population changes.

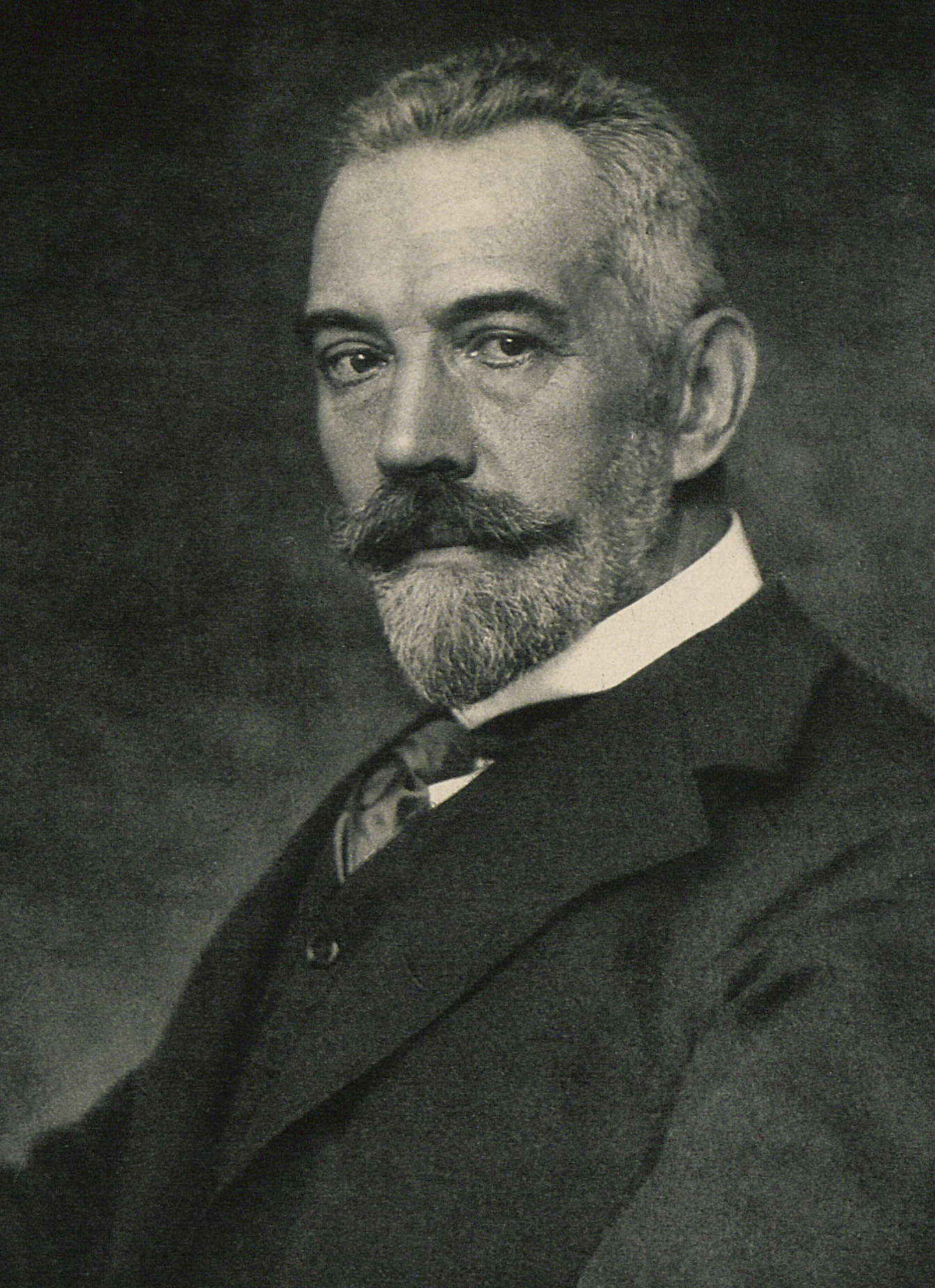
Theobald von Bethmann Hollweg

In 1910 the government of Theobald von Bethmann Hollweg, who was German Chancellor and Minister President of Prussia, introduced a bill to reform the three-class electoral system, but the reform of the universally unpopular electoral law failed to pass into law because the left uncompromisingly demanded its replacement by the Reichstag electoral law. That went too far for both the more centrist liberal and the conservative forces, which were fully willing to see reform. They called for plural suffrage, which was favored by intellectuals such as John Stuart Mill and Otto Hintze.

Immediately after the fighting in World War I ended and the German Revolution of 1918–1919 had brought down the Hohenzollern monarchy, the Council of the People's Deputies, Germany's interim governing body, on 12 November 1918 proclaimed universal democratic suffrage. This abolished the three-class franchise in Prussia and simultaneously introduced women's suffrage throughout Germany.

== Historical assessment ==
In recent times, the Prussian three-class franchise has received a more lenient assessment than in previous decades. It has, for example, been noted that both John Stuart Mill and Alexis de Tocqueville viewed the system favorably. When it was introduced, three-class suffrage was considered somewhat on the progressive side because its rolls were based not on land ownership but on taxes and because it was "universal," that is, because in principle every male was allowed to vote. For that reason it was strongly condemned by conservatives. A general, equal, secret, and direct suffrage for men, such as applied to elections to the Reichstag, was in 1914 enjoyed by only two of the 25 federal states, Baden and Württemberg, and by the imperial territory Alsace-Lorraine, which Germany had taken from France in the Franco-Prussian War in 1871. In other countries such as Great Britain, Sweden, or the Netherlands, many men were not allowed to vote until World War I due to e.g. property requirements, while in Prussia every adult male had a vote even if for most it was lightly weighted. Universal male suffrage existed outside Germany only in Switzerland and France before the turn of the century. In Sweden, for example, only 8.2 percent of the total population was allowed to vote around 1900.

Prussian electoral law was less democratic than in most other German states because of the lack of secrecy. In all other states except Waldeck, elections were considered secret after Bavaria introduced secret ballots in 1881, Braunschweig in 1899, Hesse in 1911 and Schwarzburg-Sondershausen in 1912. The secret ballot, however, often existed only on paper.

Indirect voting, on the other hand, was quite common in Europe at the time. It had been replaced by direct voting in most other German states by 1914.

In Mecklenburg-Schwerin and Mecklenburg-Strelitz, there was no elected parliamentary chamber before 1918. In Hamburg and, until 1905, in Lübeck, a tax census (payment of a certain amount of tax as a prerequisite for the right to vote) applied. In Bavaria, Saxony, Hesse, Schwarzburg-Rudolstadt, Schwarzburg-Sondershausen, Lippe and Lübeck, the payment of direct taxes was a prerequisite for the right to vote; in Saxe-Altenburg, Saxe-Coburg-Gotha and Reuss-Greiz, payment of direct taxes and one's own household were required.

In addition to Prussia, a three-class electoral law applied in Braunschweig, Lippe, Saxony (only 1896–1909), Saxe-Altenburg and Waldeck. In Lübeck there was a two-class electoral system, with the first class electing 105 representatives and the second only 15. Prussia, Bavaria, Württemberg, Baden, Hesse, and from 1911 Alsace-Lorraine had a parliament with two chambers; one of which was not filled by popular election. In most states with only one chamber of parliament, some of the deputies were either appointed by the sovereign or elected by certain groups (such as those most highly taxed, large landowners or academics). In Bremen (with an eight-class franchise) only 68 of the 150 seats were chosen by general suffrage; in Hamburg, 80 of 160; in Braunschweig, 30 of 48.

== See also ==
- Plural voting
- Weighted voting
