= Constitution of Prussia (1850) =

Government of the Kingdom of Prussia

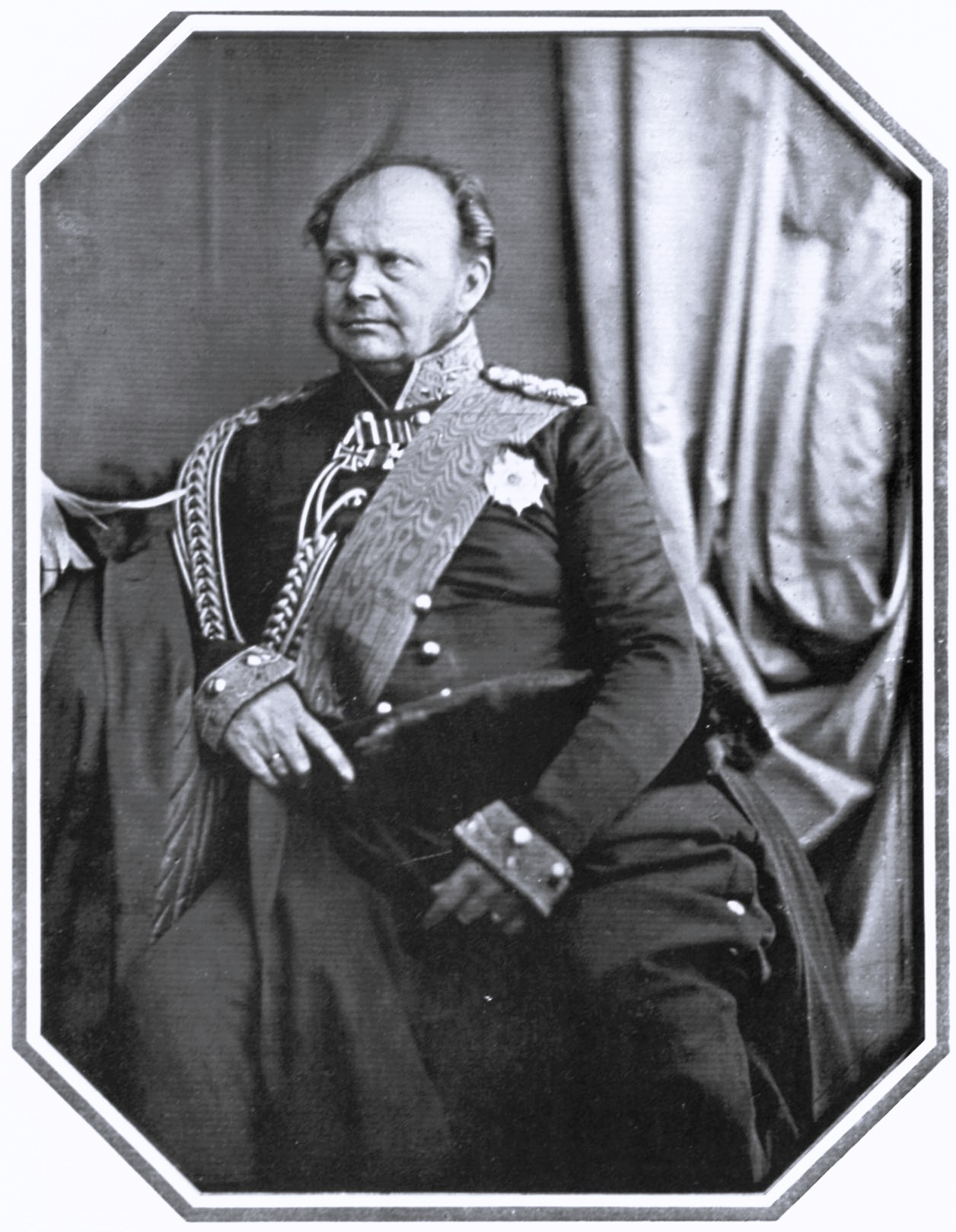
King Frederick William IV of Prussia in 1847

The 1850 Constitution of Prussia was an amended version of the 1848 Constitution. Unlike the earlier version that King Frederick William IV had unilaterally imposed on the Kingdom of Prussia on 5 December 1848, the 1850 revision was a cooperative effort between the new Prussian Parliament, the King and his ministers. The changes they made to the 1848 Constitution were mostly relatively minor. The king remained in a position of dominance over the three branches of government, and Parliament had no control over the military, but liberal elements such as the catalogue of fundamental rights, the introduction of jury courts and certain limitations on the monarch's power remained in place.

The 1850 Constitution, frequently modified, was the fundamental law of Prussia until the end of the German Empire in 1918.

== Historical background ==
=== 1848 revolution ===
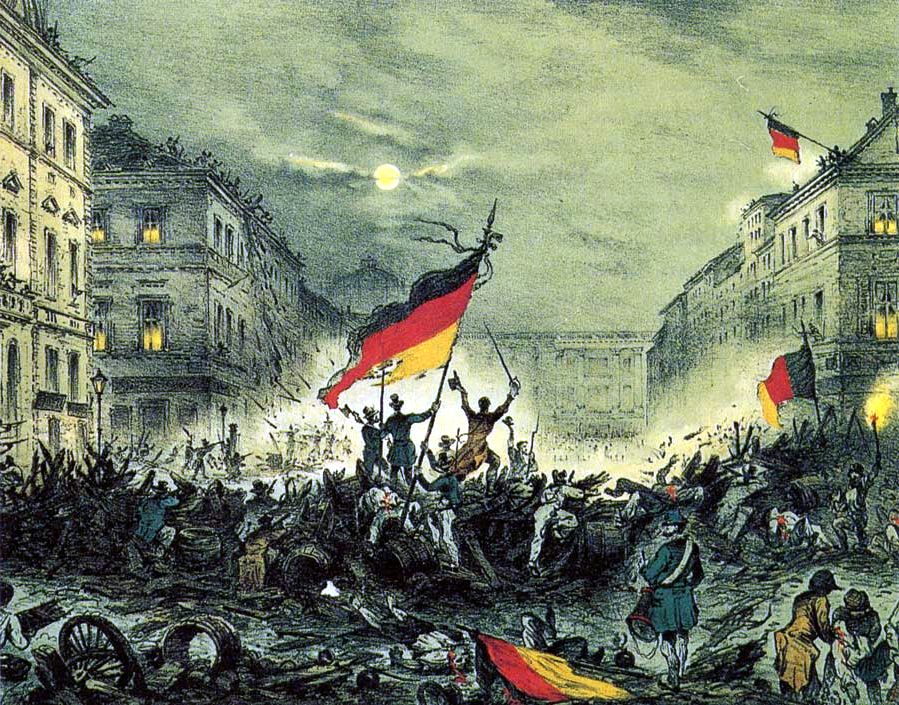
Illustration of the battle between revolutionaries and the royal military in Berlin, March 1848

In the 1840s, an economic depression and failed harvests led to widespread unrest across Germany and much of the rest of Europe. The news of the overthrow of King Louis-Philippe in Paris in February 1848 led to sympathetic revolutions across Germany, including in Prussia's capital, Berlin. In March, King Frederick William yielded to protesters' demands and promised parliamentary elections, freedom of the press and a constitution. On 18 March a large demonstration in Berlin turned into street battles that left hundreds dead. The King was shocked by the loss of life and promised to appoint a liberal ministry in response to the demonstrators' demands. Ten days later, he rode through Berlin wearing the black, red and gold armband of the revolution and authorized the convening of a national assembly.

On 11 April Gottfried Ludolf Camphausen, a moderate liberal who had been named minister president of Prussia on 29 March, called for elections to a Prussian National Assembly, with all males 25 and older able to vote. The Assembly met for the first time on 22 May. The King and his ministers presented a draft constitution in which the king retained many of his old rights. The Assembly responded with the "Charte Waldeck", named after the left-liberal Benedikt Waldeck. It included an expanded list of fundamental rights, a Volkswehr ('people's guard') responsible to Parliament and restrictions on feudal rights. The King declared to Camphausen that "he would never accept [it] under any conditions". On 9 November the King adjourned the Assembly and had it moved to Brandenburg an der Havel, ostensibly for its own safety. The next day Prussian troops under General von Wrangel occupied Berlin, essentially putting an end to revolutionary activity in the city.

=== 1848 Constitution ===
On 5 December 1848 King Frederick William unilaterally enacted a constitution for the Kingdom of Prussia. Given that the revolution had failed and the King was once more in control, the 1848 Constitution was remarkably close to the liberal Charte Waldeck. It introduced universal male suffrage and kept most of the catalogue fundamental rights, including jury trials, freedom of speech, the press and assembly. On the other hand, it created an upper house for the nobility and had ministers responsible to the king, not the Parliament. The king had veto power over legislation and could dissolve Parliament at any time, which left him firmly in a position of power in spite of the Constitution's liberal elements.

=== 1850 revision ===
The final article of the 1848 Constitution stated that "The present Constitution shall be subjected to revision … immediately after the first session of the Chambers." When the new Parliament met for the first time on 26 February 1849, it formally accepted the Constitution imposed by Frederick William the preceding December and then began work on its revision. Following disagreements with the King on certain points, Parliament was dissolved and not reconvened until August. It then went through the 1848 Constitution one article at a time and submitted its revisions to the King in mid-December. He responded with requests for a number changes, which Parliament accepted. The King promulgated the revision, the 1850 Constitution, on 31 January 1850.

== Differences between the constitutions of 1848 and 1850 ==
=== The chambers and voting ===
While the 1848 Constitution stated only that the first chamber should consist of 180 elected members (Art. 62 and 63), the 1850 revision in Article 62 added unelected members of the nobility, including royal princes of legal age, heads of the formerly immediate imperial houses and members whom the king appointed for life. In addition there were 90 members elected by direct vote and thirty members elected by the municipal councils from the larger cities. Dissolution of the first chamber applied only to the elected members. An 1853 amendment changed the makeup to members appointed by the king, with either the right of hereditary transmission or for life.

Article 71 of the 1850 Constitution (replacing Art. 68 of the 1848 version) introduced the Prussian three-class franchise for elections to the second (lower) chamber. The system weighted votes depending on the amount of taxes paid and thus gave considerably more power to the wealthy. In spite of calls for its repeal that increased over the years, the three-class franchise remained in effect in Prussia until the fall of the German Empire in 1918.

=== Other significant changes ===
Flag of the Kingdom of Prussia (1803–1892)

Note: in the references to the constitutional articles below, the first number refers to the 1848 Constitution, the second to the 1850 version. There is not always an article in the1850 Constitution that corresponds to any in the first document.

- the right to emigrate could be restricted based on the requirements for military service (Art. 10 / 11)
- the introduction of censorship was explicitly forbidden (Art. 24 / 27)
- political associations could be subjected to restrictions and temporary prohibitions through legislation (Art. 28 / 30)
- in the event of war, the king could summon the Landsturm (the reserve of all males from the ages of 15 to 60 who were capable of military service) (Art. 35 / 35)
- if either house of Parliament was dissolved, new elections were to be held within 60 days (up from 40 in the 1848 Constitution) and the houses convened within 90 days (up from 60) (Art. 49 / 51)
- conditions for a regency in case the king was underage or incapacitated were expanded in Articles 56–58 (Article 54 in the 1848 Constitution)
- draft finance laws and state budgets were to be submitted first to the second chamber; state budgets were to be approved or rejected in their entirety by the first chamber (Art. 60 / 62)
- heads of the provinces, districts and counties, instead of being appointed by the state government, were appointed by the king (Art. 104 / 105)
- review of the legal validity of duly promulgated royal decrees was made the responsibility of Parliament rather than the authorities (Art. 105 / 106)
- to amend the Constitution, each chamber had to pass the amendment by majority vote twice (instead of just once), with at least 21 days between the two ballots (Art. 106 / 107)
- the army was prohibited from swearing an oath to the Constitution (Art. 107 / 108)

== Later history ==
Both when Prussia became part of the North German Confederation after the Prussian victory in the Austro-Prussian War of 1866 and part of the German Empire five years later, following the Franco-Prussian War of 1870–1871, the Constitution of 1850 remained in place. It was, however, amended numerous times.

Following World War I and the German Revolution of 1918–1919, the Free State of Prussia, a part of the Weimar Republic, enacted a new, democratic constitution in 1920.
