= 1868 Zollparlament election =

Federal election in Germany

1868 German federal election
- February & March 1868

85 of the 382 seats in the Zollparlament 192 seats needed for a majority
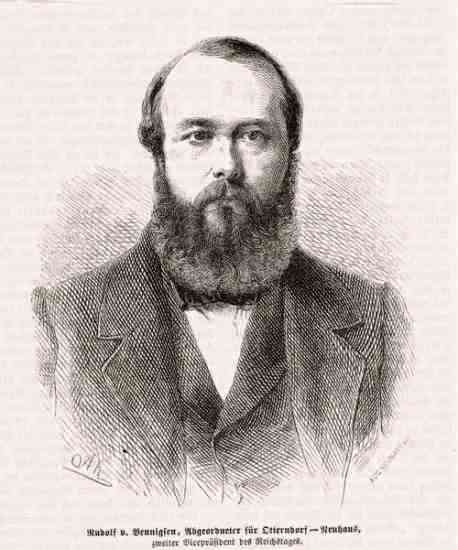

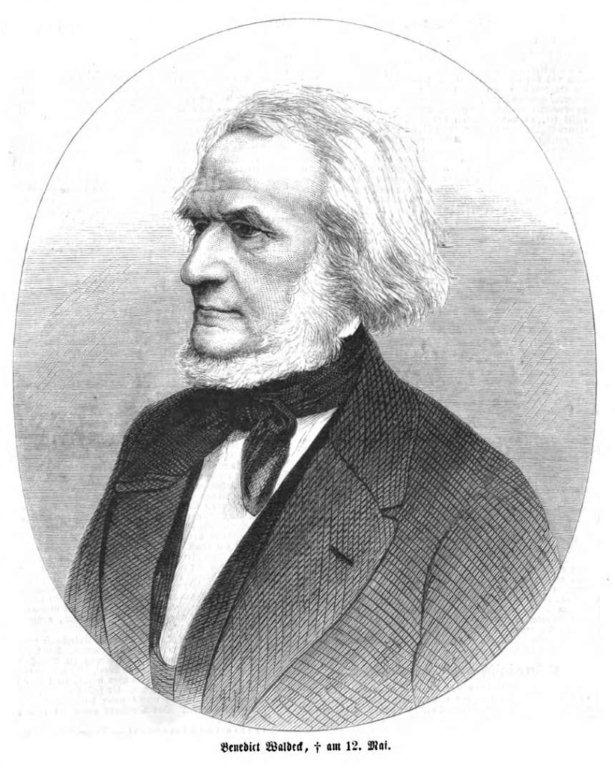
	First party	Second party	Third party
		DKP	DRP
Leader	Rudolf von Bennigsen		Eduard Georg von Bethusy-Huc (nominal)
Party	NlP	Conservatives	DRP
Leader since	1867		1866
Last election	18.02%, 80 seats	20.92%, 66 seats	8.95%, 36 seats
Seats won	26	15	0
Seats after	104	65	37
	Fourth party	Fifth party	Sixth party
	Kl		AltL
Leader		Benedict Waldeck
Party	Clericals	DFP	Old Liberals
Leader since		1867
Last election	2.09%, 8 seats	12.64%, 32 seats	4.69%, 15 seats
Seats won	28	0	0
Seats after	36	31	18
- Map of results (by constituencies)
President of the Reichstag before election
Eduard von Simson
Independent
President of the Zollparlament after election
Eduard von Simson
Independent

Elections to the Zollparlament of the German Zollverein were held in February and March 1868. The Zollparlament consisted of the members of the Reichstag of the North German Confederation and members from the South German states. Those South German members were elected in these elections, the North Germans were the Reichstag members elected the previous year.

In total, 85 South Germans were elected: 48 from Bavaria, 14 from Baden, six from Hesse-Darmstadt (additionally to the three Reichstag members in the province of Upper Hesse), and 17 from Württemberg. Most of the South German Zollparlament members were anti-Prussian regionalists. The outcome of the elections did not encourage Bismarck to take advantage of the Zollparlament as a vehicle for the political unification of Germany.

== Results ==
=== Baden ===
Party	Votes	%	Seats
National Liberal Party	97,615	51.38	8
Clericals	78,858	41.51	5
Conservatives	11,870	6.25	1
People's Party	50	0.03	0
Others	1,575	0.83	0
Total	189,968	100.00	14
Source: Wahlen in Deutschland

=== Bavaria ===
Party	Votes	%	Seats
Clericals (Bavarian Patriotic Party)	170,742	31.81	21
Bavarian Progressive	154,646	28.81	14
Liberals	113,892	21.22	6
Conservatives	91,279	17.01	7
Others and unknown	6,217	1.16	0
Total	536,776	100.00	48
Source: Wahlen in Deutschland

=== Hessen ===
Party	Votes	%	Seats
National Liberal Party	50,422	67.14	4
Free Conservative Party	12,816	17.07	2
People's Party	5,918	7.88	0
Conservatives	4,113	5.48	0
General German Workers' Association	991	1.32	0
Progress Party	524	0.70	0
Others	317	0.42	0
Total	75,101	100.00	6
Source: Wahlen in Deutschland

=== Württemberg ===
Party	Votes	%	Seats
Conservatives (ministerials)	65,257	32.55	7
People's Party	59,518	29.69	8
National Liberal Party	53,630	26.75	0
Clericals	21,766	10.86	2
Others	317	0.16	0
Total	200,488	100.00	17
Source: Wahlen in Deutschland

=== Seat distribution ===
Party	Seats
Clericals (including Bavarian Patriot Party)	28
National Liberal Party (including Bavarian Progressive Party)	26
Conservatives	15
German People's Party	8
Other Liberals	6
Free Conservative Party	2
TOTAL	85
