= Hans Victor von Unruh =

Prussian and German politician

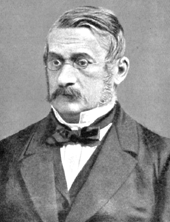

Prussian National Assembly
- In office 1848–1852
- Constituency: Magdeburg

Second Chamber of the Prussian Landtag
- In office January 1849 – April 1849
- Constituency: Magdeburg

Prussian Landtag
- In office 1863–1867
- Constituency: Magdeburg

Parliament of the North German Confederation
- In office 1867–1871
- Constituency: Magdeburg

Reichstag
- In office 1871–1879
- Constituency: Magdeburg

Personal details
- Born: March 28, 1806 Tilsit, East Prussia
- Died: February 4, 1886 (aged 79) Dessau, Anhalt
- Party: Progress Party; National Liberal Party
- Occupation: Engineer

Hans Victor von Unruh (March 28, 1806 – February 4, 1886) was a Prussian civil servant and politician, President of the Prussian National Assembly of 1848 and Member of the Reichstag of the German Empire.

== Biography ==
Unruh was born in Tilsit, East Prussia to Majorgeneral Friedrich-Wilhelm von Unruh (1766–1835) and Karoline, née Freiin von Buttlar (1776–1858). He visited school in Königsberg and studied at Karl Friedrich Schinkel's Bauakademie Berlin, where he passed his exam in 1834. On September 14, 1828, Unruh married Ernestine von Risselmann, née von Knobloch (1802–1869) in Breslau, but was divorced soon after. In 1834 he married Marie Clement (1816–1849) in Frankfurt (Oder). Unruh started to work as an hydraulic engineer in Breslau and became a governmental engineer in Gumbinnen in 1839 and after an apply for transfer in Potsdam in 1843. In 1844 he took a voluntary leave of absence and became the head of the railroad construction Magdeburg-Potsdam and a member of the board of Directors of the Magdeburg-Wittenberg Railway Company, himself moving to Magdeburg with his family.

Unruh made several foreign study trips with August Borsig.

After the Revolution of 1848 Unruh was elected as Magdeburg's Member of the Prussian constitutional convention as a modest Liberal. He joined the left centre, later the right centre parliamentary group.

On October 17, 1848, Unruh was elected as the deputy president, on October 28, 1848, President of the constitutional convention, a position he kept until the convention was dissolved in 1852. In January 1849 Unruh became the delegate of Magdeburg at the Second Chamber of the Prussian Landtag, which was dissolved in April 1849 after its opposition against the Prussian three-class franchise. As a result of Unruh's position King Friedrich Wilhelm IV of Prussia declined his appointment even though the Magdeburg town councillors had elected him as First Mayor.

In 1855 Unruh moved to Anhalt, at that time another component state of Germany, where he founded the Deutsche Continental Gasgesellschaft in Dessau and was responsible for the construction of the municipal gasworks at Mönchengladbach, Magdeburg und Lviv and the water supply works at Magdeburg.

Unruh was a Co-founder of the German National Association in 1859 and the liberal Deutsche Fortschrittspartei in 1861, becoming its first President until 1863. In 1863 he was reelected as a member of the Prussian Parliament. The Fortschrittspartei was split after a conflict on the support of Otto von Bismarck and Unruh founded the National Liberal Party jointly with Rudolf von Bennigsen in 1867.

Unruh was a member of the Parliament of the North German Confederation in 1867 and the Reichstag until 1879. On April 9, 1874, as a vice-president of the Reichstag, he implemented the Hammelsprung (lit: mutton skip), a special kind of division, still used in the modern German Bundestag.

Unruh died on February 4, 1886, in Dessau.

== Works ==
- Skizzen aus Preußens neuester Geschichte, 1849
- Erfahrungen aus den letzten drei Jahren. Ein Beitrag zur Kritik der politischen Mittelparteien, 1851
- Erinnerungen aus dem Leben, (hrsg. von Heinrich von Poschinger, 1895)
