= Congress of German Economists =

The Congress of German Economists (German: Volkswirtschaftlicher Kongress or Kongress deutscher Volkswirte) was an association of German economists founded in Gotha, in 1858. The model for the association was the British Anti-Corn Law League, founded in 1838 by Richard Cobden.

The Congress' main cause was to promote free trade and the cooperative movement. Important members of the Congress were John Prince-Smith, Julius Faucher, Wilhelm Adolf Lette, Hermann Schulze-Delitzsch, Heinrich Bernhard Oppenheim and Karl Braun, who would chair most of the meetings.

With the increase of international protectionism at the end of the 19th century, the Congress lost most of its influence. The year 1879 was a disaster year for the German pro-free-trade movement, when Bismarck enacted the iron and rye tariffs and broke with the National Liberal Party.

== See also ==
- Liberalism in Germany
- Liberalism
