= Julius Faucher =

German journalist and politician (1820–1876)

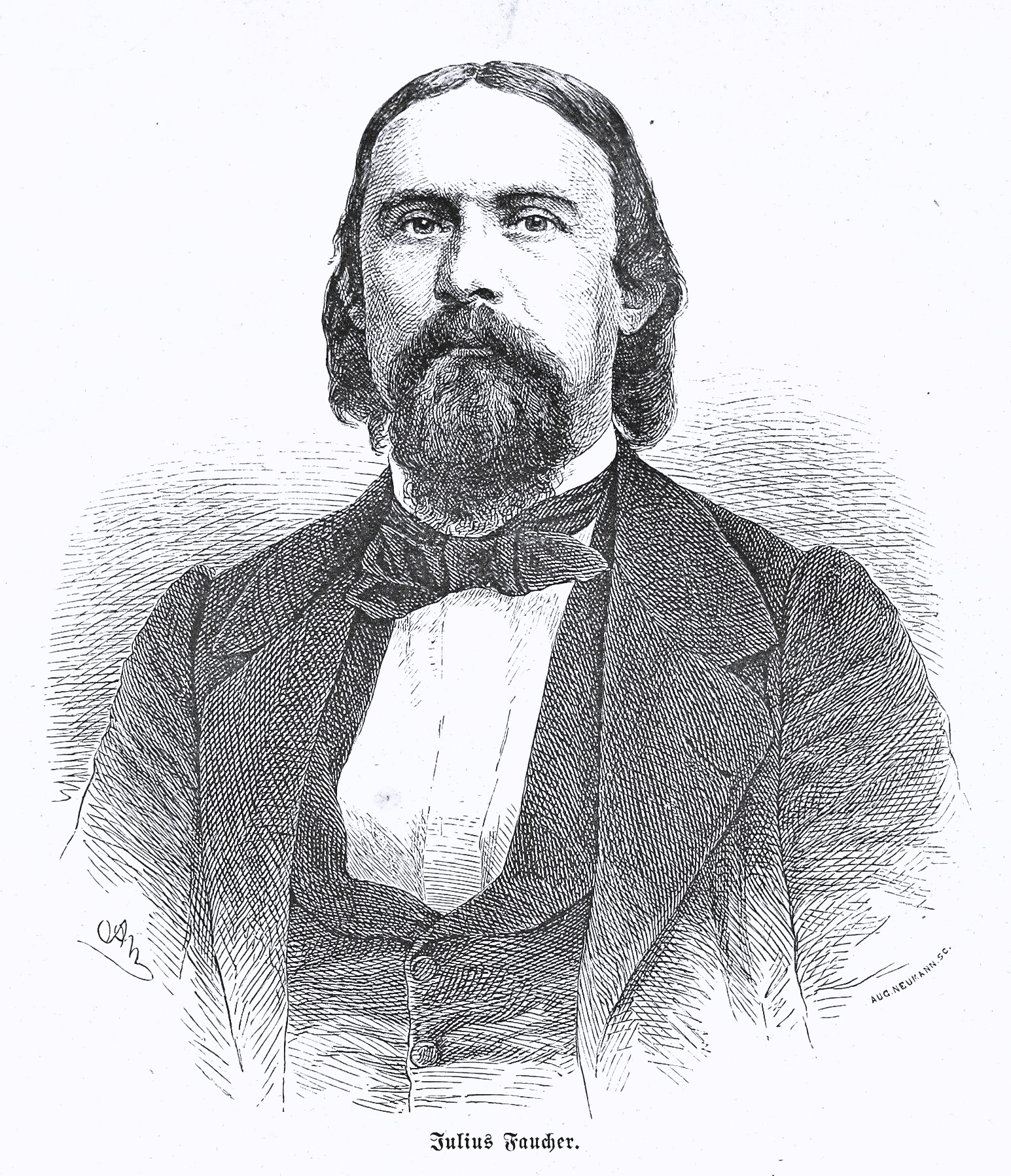
Julius Faucher

Julius Faucher (13 June 1820 in Berlin – 12 June 1878 in Rome) was a German journalist and a significant advocate of liberalism and free trade. He was one of the first to advocate privatizing the security functions of the state, which would eliminate taxation. Ralph Raico described his idea as "a form of individualist anarchism, or, as it would be called today, anarcho-capitalism or market anarchism".

== Biography ==
Faucher's father, a Huguenot, was a member of the French colony in Berlin. Faucher studied philosophy in Berlin. In 1845, Faucher married Karoline Sommerbrodt, daughter of a hat-maker from Berlin, with whom he later had a daughter, Lucie, "the greatest joy of his eventful life".

In 1844, Faucher got to know John Prince-Smith and became an advocate of Manchester Liberalism. Thus, they founded the Free Trade Association of Berlin (which did not have much influence) and the Free Trade-newspaper Börsennachrichten an der Ostsee, later becoming the Ostseezeitung. In this newspaper, they advanced a laissez-faire trade policy. It was in this time that Faucher attended the regular meetings of several left-wing Hegelians and economists, including Max Stirner, at the Hippel Restaurant in Friedrichstraße. When the Revolutions of 1848 took place, Faucher entered combat on 18–19 March in Stockholm (Marsoroligheterna).

In 1850, Faucher became editor of the newspaper Berliner Abendpost, of which he was the founder. After facing conflicts with the Prussian government about his free trade points of view, including suppression of his newspaper, Faucher emigrated to England. There, he joined the staff of the Morning Star and became correspondent for several German newspapers and later secretary to Richard Cobden.

Faucher returned to Prussia in 1861, where he advocate strenuously for the liberty of domicile, free trade and freedom in industry. He was elected to the Abgeordnetenhaus (a semi-parliament) for the German Progress Party. In 1863, he founded the newspaper Vierteljahrzeitschrift für Volkswirtschaft und Kulturgeschichte (Quarterly Journal for Economics and Cultural History). During the Franco-Prussian War, he was correspondent of the London Daily News with the German armies.

In 1866, Faucher left the Progress Party and founded with 14 other Progress Party members and 9 members of the Zentrumspartei a new party, the National Liberal Party. The reason for the split-off was Otto von Bismarck's Indemnitätsvorlage as the Progress Party voted against it while the National Liberals were on the side of Chancellor Bismarck (who broke the budget law to finance the war against Austria).

== Works ==
- Ein Winter in Italien, Griechenland und Konstantinople ("A winter in Italy, Greece and Constantinople", 1876).
- Vergleichende Kulturbilder aus den vier europäischen Millionenstädten ("Comparative descriptions of culture in the four largest European cities", 1877).
- Streifzüge durch die Küsten und Inseln des Archipels und des ionischen Meeres ("Excursions through the coasts and island of the Ionian Sea", 1878).
- "Russian Agrarian Legislation of 1861" (in System of Land Tenure in Various Countries, 3rd ed., London, 1881).
