= Realpolitik =

Approach in diplomacy and politics

Realpolitik (/reɪˈɑːlpɒlɪˌtiːk/ ray-AHL-po-lih-teek German: [ʁeˈaːlpoliˌtiːk]) is the conduct of diplomacy or politics primarily based on consideration or circumspection of present circumstances and factors rather than on ideology or morality. Thus it is philosophically similar to realism and pragmatism.

While generally used as a positive or neutral term, realpolitik has been used pejoratively to refer to policies that are perceived as coercive, amoral, or Machiavellian. Prominent proponents of realpolitik include Otto von Bismarck, Henry Kissinger, George H. W. Bush, George F. Kennan, Zbigniew Brzezinski, Hans-Dietrich Genscher, Helmut Schmidt, Deng Xiaoping, Charles de Gaulle, Lee Kuan Yew and Robert Habeck. Realpolitik is often contrasted with Idealpolitik, which is guided by moral principles or ideals, and Gefühlspolitik, which is driven by and appeals to emotion or popular sentiment.

== Etymology ==
The term Realpolitik was coined by Ludwig von Rochau, a German writer and politician in the 19th century. His 1853 book Grundsätze der Realpolitik angewendet auf die staatlichen Zustände Deutschlands ("Principles of Realpolitik applied to the national state of affairs of Germany") describes the meaning of the term:

The study of the forces that shape, maintain and alter the state is the basis of all political insight and leads to the understanding that the law of power governs the world of states just as the law of gravity governs the physical world. The older political science was fully aware of this truth but drew a wrong and detrimental conclusion—the right of the more powerful. The modern era has corrected this unethical fallacy, but while breaking with the alleged right of the more powerful one, the modern era was too much inclined to overlook the real might of the more powerful and the inevitability of its political influence.

Historian John Bew suggests that much of what stands for modern Realpolitik today deviates from the original meaning of the term. Realpolitik emerged in mid-19th century Europe from the collision of the Enlightenment with state formation and power politics. The concept, Bew argues, was an early attempt at answering the conundrum of how to achieve liberal enlightened goals in a world that does not follow liberal enlightened rules.

Rochau coined the term in 1853 and added a second volume in 1869 that further refined his earlier arguments. Rochau, exiled in Paris until the 1848 uprising, returned during the revolution and became a well-known figure in the National Liberal Party. As the liberal gains of the 1848 revolutions fell victim to coercive governments or were swallowed by powerful social forces such as class, religion and nationalism, Rochau—according to Bew—began to think hard about how the work that had begun with such enthusiasm had failed to yield any lasting results.

He said that the great achievement of the Enlightenment had been to show that might is not necessarily right. The mistake liberals made was to assume that the law of the strong had suddenly evaporated simply because it had been shown to be unjust. Rochau wrote that "to bring down the walls of Jericho, the Realpolitiker knows the simple pickaxe is more useful than the mightiest trumpet". Rochau's concept was seized upon by German thinkers in the mid and late 19th century and became associated with Otto von Bismarck's statecraft in unifying Germany in the mid 19th century. By 1890, usage of the word Realpolitik was widespread, yet increasingly detached from its original meaning.

== History and branches ==
=== China ===
Even prior to the contemporary Realpolitik term, China has had a "realistic" tradition in its governance dating back thousands of years. Often referred to as Chinese Legalism, the spirit of its content may be most readily recognised by Western viewers through one of its kindred, The Art of War. Chinese administrative organisation significantly influenced other Asian nations as well as Western administrative practices not later than the 12th century, playing a significant role in the development of the modern state, including the usage of examinations (Note: Known as the imperial examination (simplified Chinese: 科举; traditional Chinese: 科舉) in China.) for entry to the civil service.

Starting in the Spring and Autumn period (771–476/403 BC), a trend of "realistic" reformers were taken on to advance the material interest of their respective states, with the Qin state founding the first Chinese Empire, Qin dynasty in 221 BCE, ending China's Warring States period. The political theory developed during the era, including that of Confucianism would influence every dynasty thereafter.

Those termed Legalist are more purely "Realpolitikal" (Note: Civilization and Realpolitik, by Prasenjit Duara, India International Centre Quarterly, Vol. 36, No. 3/4, INDIACHINA Neighbours Strangers (WINTER 2009 SPRING 2010), pp. 20-33.) in contrast to Confucianism and include non-legal Shen Pu-hai derived political technique, which charges the ruler engage in passive observation to determine facts rather than take on too much himself. Sinologist Herrlee G. Creel writes: "If one wishes to exaggerate, it would no doubt be possible to translate (foundational Realist) Shen Buhai's term Shu, or technique, as 'science', and argue that Pu-hai was the first political scientist," though Creel does "not care to go this far".

During the Spring and Autumn period, the prevalent philosophy had dictated war as a gentleman's activity; military commanders were instructed to respect what they perceived to be Heaven's laws in battle.

=== Germany ===
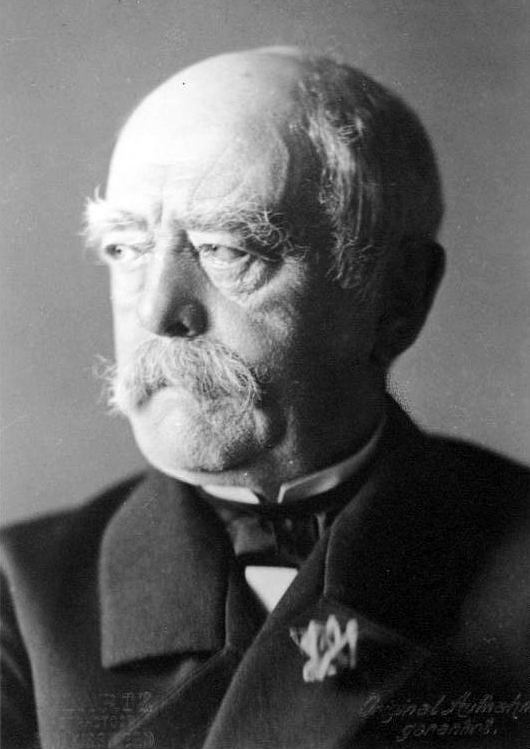
Otto von Bismarck, a German statesman often associated with Realpolitik

In the United States, the term is often analogous to power politics while in Germany Realpolitik has a somewhat less negative connotation, referring to realistic politics in opposition to idealistic (or unrealistic) politics. It is particularly associated with the era of 19th century nationalism. Realpolitik policies were employed in response to the failed Revolutions of 1848 as means to strengthen states and tighten social order.

The most famous German advocate of Realpolitik, what was uniquely possible and the applied means to achieve it, was Otto von Bismarck, the first Chancellor (1862–1890) to Wilhelm I of the Kingdom of Prussia. Bismarck used Realpolitik in his quest to achieve Prussian dominance in Germany.

Another example was his willingness to adopt some social policies of the socialists such as employee insurance and pensions; in doing so, he used small changes from the top down to avoid the possibility of major change from the bottom up. Likewise, Prussia's seemingly illogical move of not demanding territory from a defeated Austria, a move that later led to the unification of Germany, is an oft-cited example of Realpolitik.

=== Singapore ===
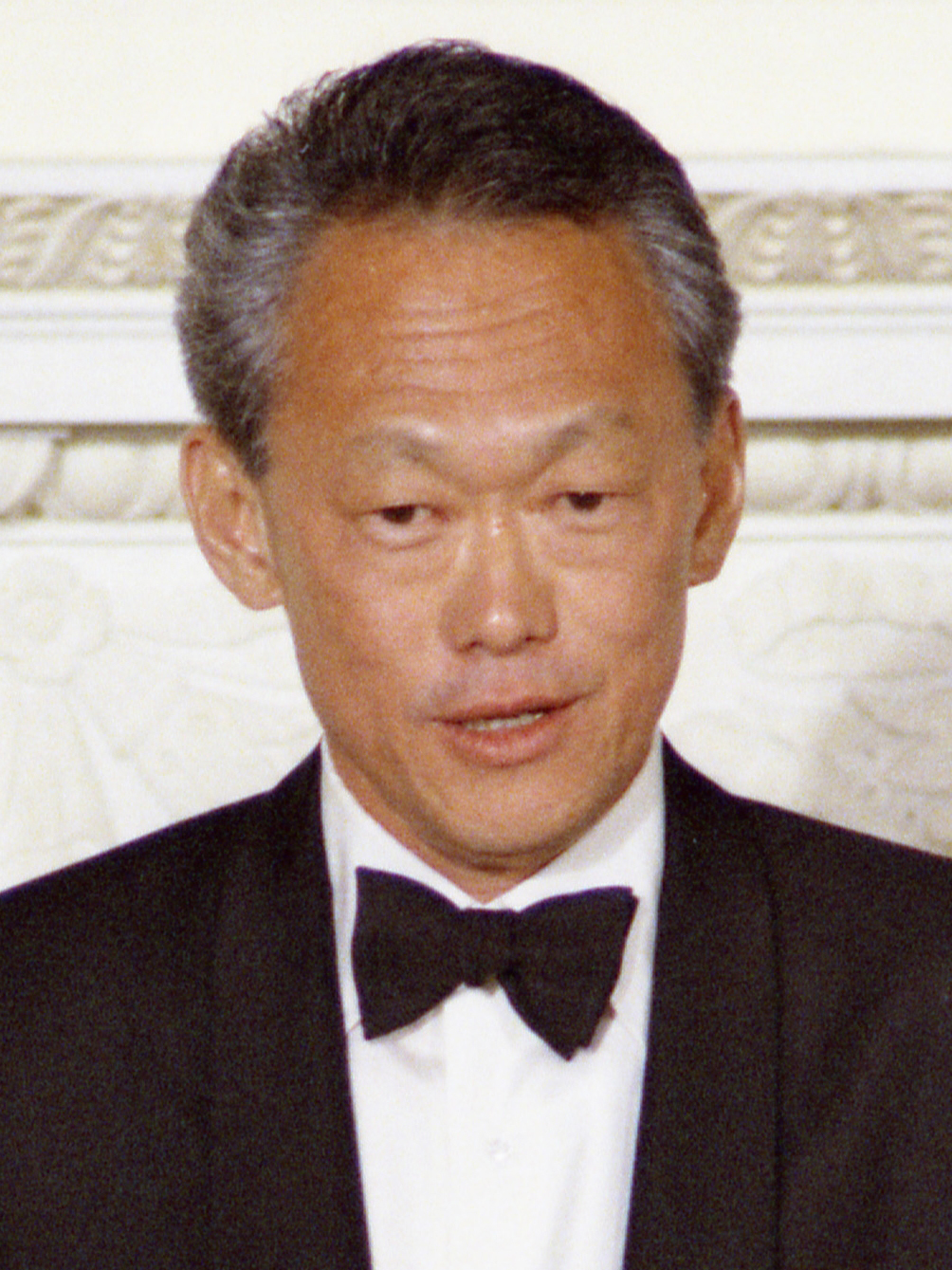
Lee Kuan Yew, first Prime Minister of Singapore and one of the founders of the People's Action Party

Singaporean statesman Lee Kuan Yew, who served as the country's first prime minister, has been considered by many political analysts as a pragmatist for his erudite policies in his governance of Singapore. He believed that the only way Singapore could survive as a relatively small nation as compared to its neighbours was to contrast itself from them, by building up a highly effective and non-corrupt government, in addition to a civil service, under a meritocratic system. He also believed that Singapore was to stay neutral but also possess a strong military capability, believing that it serves as a guarantor of the country's independence due to its strategic position. A strong advocate for Asian values, he argued that Asian societies had different values from Western societies and that practicing such values was vital to succeed as a nation, especially as an Asian country, which includes collectivism and communitarianism.

Lee described Singapore's only natural resources as being the grit of its people as well as their strong work ethic, propelling this mindset to all ethnic groups of the country. Although Lee supported left-wing ideas in his young adulthood, he was largely conservative as a leader, concluding that extensive state welfare and subsidies blunted the individual's drive to succeed. Nevertheless, his government still enacted social policies, which included free public education up until at least secondary school, state housing, a compulsory comprehensive savings and pension plan, as well as universal healthcare, in addition to a civic nationalist stance.

In 1975, Chan Heng Chee described Singapore as a depoliticised "administrative state", where ideology and politics had triumphantly been replaced by "rational and scientific modes of public administration". It is suggested that by doggedly describing itself as pragmatic, the Singaporean state is actually disguising its ideological work and political nature through an assertion of the absence of ideology and politics. Chua Beng Huat argued in 1995 that the rhetoric of pragmatism in Singapore is ideological and hegemonic in nature, adopted and disseminated in the public sphere by the People's Action Party government and institutionalised throughout the state in all its administrative, planning, and policy-making functions.

Many world leaders affirmed Lee's political knowledge as being pragmatist and "insightful". Former President of the United States, Barack Obama, stated that he "personally appreciated [Lee's] wisdom." Former Prime Minister of Japan, Shinzo Abe, who had also championed for Asian values, stated that Lee was "one of the greatest leaders of modern times that Asia has ever produced" and a "great Asian leader who laid the foundation for the prosperity of Singapore today." Former Prime Minister of Australia, Tony Abbott, mentioned that Lee was a "giant of our region" and that "thanks to his vision and determination, Singapore is one of the world's most successful countries." Henry Kissinger described Lee as one of the "world's most successful pragmatists".

=== United Kingdom ===
E. H. Carr was a liberal realist and left-wing British historian and international relations theorist who argued for realistic international over utopian policies. Carr described realism as the acceptance that what exists is right; he thus argued that in politics, realism meant that there is no moral dimension and that what is successful is right and what is unsuccessful is wrong. Carr was convinced that the Bolsheviks were destined to win the Russian Civil War and, under the grounds of Realpolitik, approved of British Prime Minister David Lloyd George's opposition to War Secretary Winston Churchill's support for military aid to the anti-Bolshevik White movement. In Carr's opinion, Churchill's support of the anti-Bolsheviks was folly, as Russia was likely to be a great power once more under the leadership of the Bolsheviks.

=== United States ===
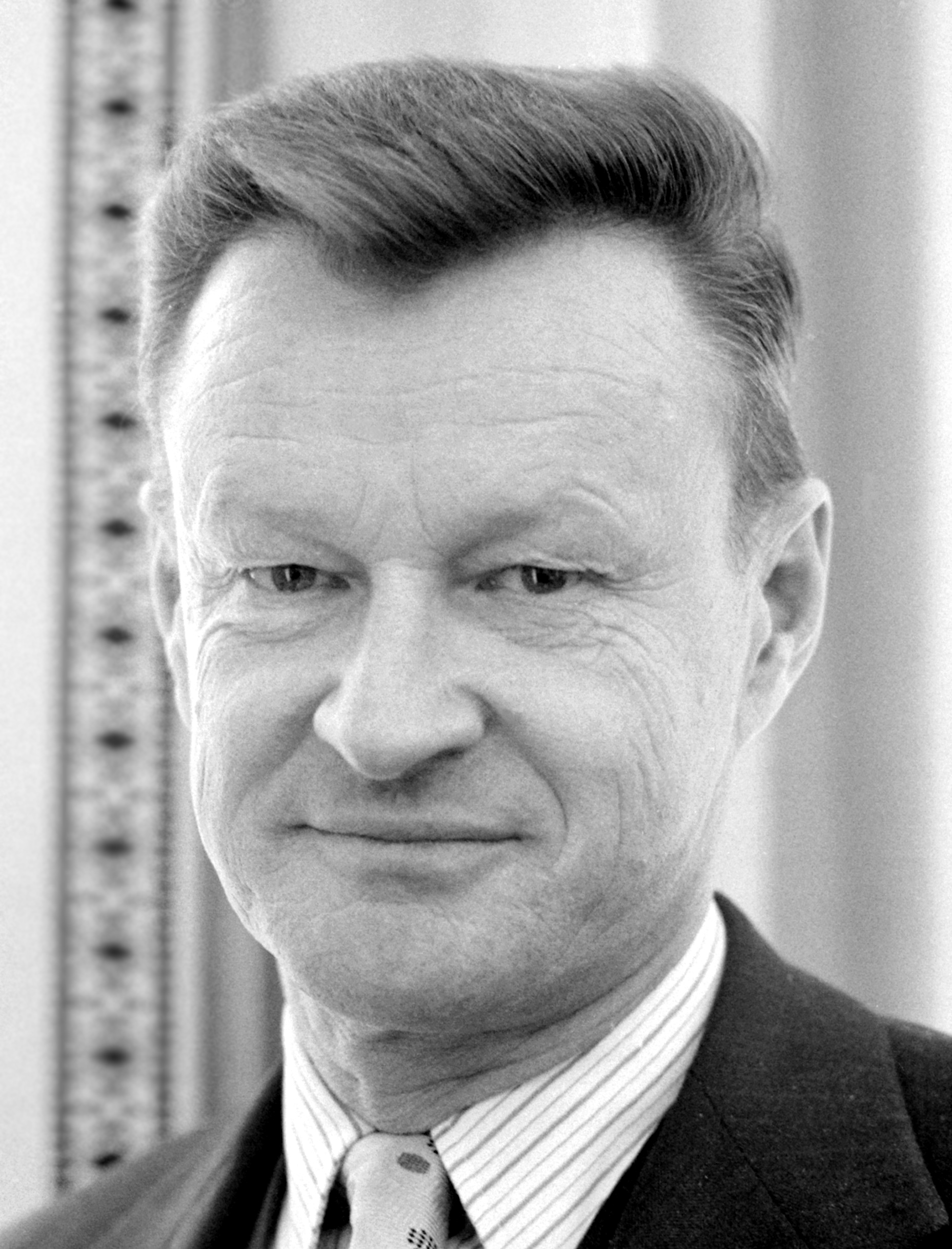
Zbigniew Brzezinski

American Realpolitik began in the 1960s with the influence of Polish-American Zbigniew Brzezinski, later National Security Advisor to Jimmy Carter. Contrary to McCarthy-era hostility and John Foster Dulles's talk of the military "liberation" of the Eastern Bloc, Brzezinski proposed "peaceful engagement" with the Soviet Union while he advised Presidents John F. Kennedy and Lyndon B. Johnson. Brzezinski, uninterested in promoting anti-Soviet propaganda for the benefit of the United States, felt the country would be more successful through frequent interactions with regimes and people under communist rule. Brzezinski knew the tough economic realities of those living in the Eastern Bloc, particularly the permanent shortage of goods, and that their attachment to the Soviet Union was born of historic necessity, rather than common ideology. Brzezinski suggested enticing these countries economically and through educational and cultural exchanges, which would appeal to intellectuals, followed by favouritism for regimes showing signs of liberalisation or less reliance on Moscow. Through that approach, Brzezinski "offered a realistic, evolutionary alternative to empty political rhetoric."

Henry Kissinger has been credited with formally introducing the policy of Realpolitik to the White House as Secretary of State to Richard Nixon. In that context, the policy meant dealing with other powerful nations in a practical manner, rather than on the basis of political doctrine or ethics such as Nixon's diplomacy with the People's Republic of China despite U.S. opposition to communism and the previous doctrine of containment.

Kissinger himself said that he had never used the term Realpolitik and stated that it is used by both liberal and realist foreign policy thinkers to label, criticise, and facilitate a choosing of sides. Kissinger had looked at what he implemented while he served as Secretary of State and National Security Advisor not in the confines of making Realpolitik a standard policy, but within the terms of being a statesman. That political mindset can be seen in Kissinger's book A World Restored and was pointed out by historian John Bew in his book Realpolitik. Kissinger went on to say that the role of the statesman is "the ability to recognize the real relationship of forces and to make this knowledge serve his ends."

In that context, one can see how Realpolitik principles can influence U.S. policy but not as standard policy. The reach and influence of Realpolitik is found instead in pragmatic and flexible policy that changes to the needs of the situation. That type of policymaking could be seen as recently as in the administration of Barack Obama. Bew made note of that direction in the Obama administration, when Obama's chief of staff, Rahm Emanuel, remarked in an article in The New York Times that everyone wanted to break it down into contrasts of idealist and realist, but "if you had to put him in a category, he's probably more realpolitik, like Bush 41 [...] You’ve got to be cold-blooded about the self-interests of your nation."

Realpolitik is distinct from ideological politics in that it is not dictated by a fixed set of rules but instead tends to be goal-oriented, limited only by practical exigencies. Since Realpolitik is ordered toward the most practical means of securing national interests, it can often entail compromising on ideological principles. For example, during the Cold War, the United States often supported authoritarian regimes that were human rights violators to theoretically secure the greater national interest of regional stability. After the end of the Cold War, this practice continued.

Most recently, former Ambassador Dennis Ross advocated that approach to foreign policy in his 2007 book Statecraft: And How to Restore America's Standing in the World. For the purposes of contrast and speaking in ideal types, political ideologues would tend to favor principle over other considerations. Such individuals or groups can reject compromises that they see as the abandonment of their ideals and so may sacrifice political gain, in favor of adhering to principles that they believe to be constitutive of long-term goals.

=== Pakistan ===
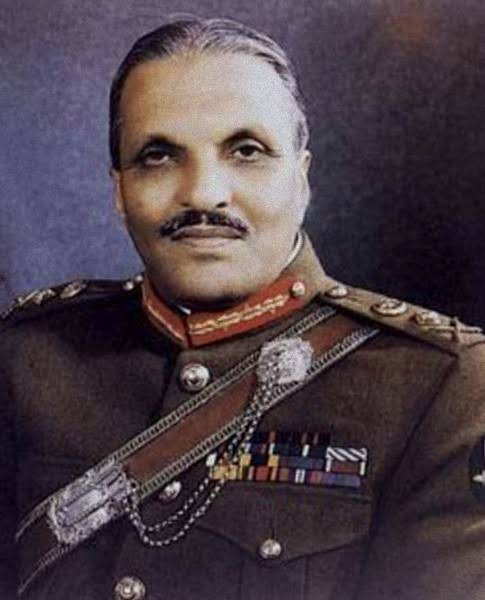
Muhammad Zia-ul-Haq

Relations between Pakistan and the U.S. were strained during the 1970s due to Pakistan's nuclear program and the controversial execution of President Zulfikar Ali Bhutto.

In the context of the Iranian Revolution, President Jimmy Carter desired to improve relations with Pakistan. General Muhammad Zia-ul-Haq came into power in 1977 after martial law was imposed in the country due to political turmoil. Zia recognised the immediate strategic interests that Pakistan may obtain by aligning with the U.S. amidst the Soviet–Afghan War.

Pakistan due to its strategic geopolitical location made it a subject of grave interest to the U.S., which supported Pakistan with financial and military assistance including General Dynamics F-16 Fighting Falcon and financial aid during the Soviet–Afghan War.

Zia initially declined the 400 million USD aid offered by the U.S. (under the Carter administration) dismissing it as "peanuts". However, when Ronald Reagan entered office and sought to increment the funding for Operation Cyclone and aid for Pakistan, the U.S. and Pakistan agreed on a US$3.2 billion military and economic aid package.

Under Zia's leadership, Pakistan played a pivotal role in training the Afghan mujahidin, in conjunction with Operation Cyclone to oppose the Soviet-backed government in Afghanistan.

One of the major Realpolitik decision of Zia's presidency was his role in the nuclear program of Pakistan. Amidst international pressure, he ignored threats of sanctions and prioritised the national interest over non-proliferation international norms. The development of nuclear weapons was seen as crucial for deterrence against Pakistan's historical rival, India, which had successfully conducted nuclear tests in 1974.

== See also ==
- Consequentialism
- Deterrence theory
- Monopoly on the legitimate use of physical force
- Noopolitik
- Power politics
- Weltpolitik

== Works cited ==
- John Bew: "The Real Origins of Realpolitik", The National Interest, 2014
- John Bew: "Real Realpolitik: A History", The John W. Kluge Center at the Library of Congress, April 10, 2014. Accessed July 29, 2014.
- David Robertson: The Routledge Dictionary of Politics. Routledge 2004. ISBN 978-0-415-32377-2, p. 420 (restricted online copy, p. 420, at Google Books)
- Hajo Holborn: History of Modern Germany: 1840–1945. Princeton University Press 1982, ISBN 978-0-691-00797-7, p. 117 (restricted online copy, p. 117, at Google Books)
- Ruth Weissbourd Grant: Hypocrisy and integrity: Machiavelli, Rousseau, and the ethics of politics. University of Chicago Press 1997, ISBN 978-0-226-30582-0, p. 40–41 (restricted online copy, p. 40, at Google Books)
- Frank Whelon Wayman (ed.), Paul Francis Diehl (ed.): Reconstructing Realpolitik. University of Michigan Press 1994, ISBN 978-0-472-08268-1 (restricted online copy at Google Books)
- Federico Trocini: L’invenzione della «Realpolitik» e la scoperta della «legge del potere». August Ludwig von Rochau tra radicalismo e nazional-liberalismo, il Mulino, Bologna 2009
