= Karl Braun (politician, 1822) =

German politician and writer (1822–1893)

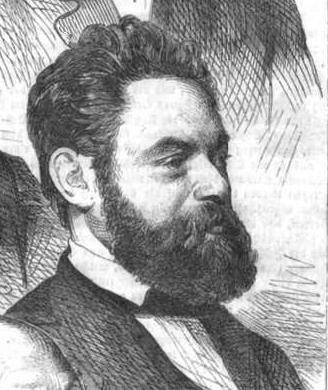

Karl Joseph Wilhelm Braun [sometimes referred to as Braun-Wiesbaden to differentiate him from other Karl Brauns] (20 March 1822 – 14 July 1893) was a German liberal politician and writer.

== Biography ==
He was born at Hadamar, in the Duchy of Nassau, and studied classical philology and history at Marburg, and law and political economy at Göttingen. He was president of the Nassau Chamber of Deputies from 1859 to 1866, and as the leader of the Liberals advocated German unity and industrial freedom.

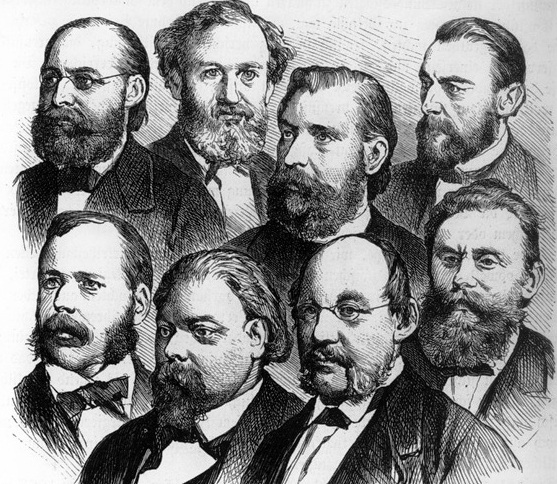
Leading politicians of the National Liberal Party of Germany (woodcut c. 1878): Top row (L-R): Wilhelm Wehrenpfennig, Eduard Lasker, Heinrich von Treitschke, Johannes von Miquel; Bottom row (L-R): Franz von Roggenbach, Karl Braun, Rudolf Gneist, Ludwig Bamberger.

He was one of the founders of the Volkswirtschaftlicher Kongress (“Congress of German Economists”), and was elected its permanent president in 1859. In 1863 he established the Vierteljahrschrift für Volkswirtschaft und Kulturgeschichte (“Quarterly for Political Economy and History”) , the representative organ of the Free-Trade Party of Germany . He edited this publication until 1887. As a deputy in the Reichstag, he was successively identified with the National Liberal, Secessionist, and German Liberal parties.

He published a great variety of works, among which Bilder aus der deutschen Kleinstaaterei (“Vignettes from the times of the small German principalities,” 1881) is the most notable.
