= Democratic People's Party (Germany) =

Two political parties in Germany

The Democratic People's Party (German: Demokratische Volkspartei, DVP) was the name of two liberal parties in Germany that were active from 1863 to 1866 and after the Second World War. It is not to be confused with the Deutsche Volkspartei of 1918–1933, which used the same abbreviation DVP.

Between 1863 and 1866, a Demokratische Volkspartei or Württembergische Volkspartei was active in the Kingdom of Württemberg. It was a more left-liberal party that had broken from the German Progress Party of 1861 with the primary goal of establishing a loosely federal Germany free from the "hegemony" of Prussia and Austria. In 1868, after Prussia defeated Austria in the Austro-Prussian War of 1866, it became part of the German People's Party (Deutsche Volkspartei ) along with other liberal parties of southern Germany that had supported Austria. In 1910, the party merged with two similar parties to form the Progressive People's Party (Fortschrittliche Volkspartei), which in 1918 became the German Democratic Party; the party dissolved in 1933.

After the Second World War, liberals in the State of Württemberg-Baden re-founded a party with the name Demokratische Volkspartei. In 1948 it joined with other state parties in the Free Democratic Party. For historical reasons, the state party in Baden-Württemberg still uses the old name together with the national name (FDP/DVP).
