= German People's Party (1868) =

Defunct political party in the German Reich

German People's Party Deutsche Volkspartei
- Founded: 20 September 1868; 157 years ago
- Dissolved: 6 March 1910; 115 years ago
- Preceded by: Democratic People's Party
- Merged into: Progressive People's Party
- Newspaper: Frankfurter Zeitung (unofficial)
- Ideology: Social liberalism Republicanism; Radicalism; Federalism
- Political position: Centre-left to left-wing 1868–1890s: Left-wing to far-left (Note: The DtVP was more radical than the left-wing Progress Party, particularly in its rejection of the Prussian-led unification and its advocacy for a more democratic federalism.)
- Colors

The German People's Party (German: Deutsche Volkspartei, DtVP) was a German liberal party created in 1868 by the former wing of the German National Association which during the conflict about whether the unification of Germany should be led by the Kingdom of Prussia or Austria-Hungary supported Austria. The party was most popular in Southern Germany.

Initially, the South German democrats supported the Greater German solution of the German Question. After the establishment of the German Empire in 1871 under Prussia, the solution which excluded Austria, it advocated federalist structures and defended the South German states' rights against increasing strengthening of the central government in Berlin. Insistently, the party demanded democratic reforms, in particular strengthening of the position of the parliament, which had no say in the formation of the government and no influence on government policies as the government was appointed and dismissed by the emperor alone.

In contrast to the National Liberal Party, the party stood in staunch opposition against the policy of Otto von Bismarck from the establishment of the German Empire. The party put the liberal notion of liberty above the prospect of a German unification led from above. The party was highly critical of the Prusso-German monarchy and advocated the separation of church and state. Still, it rejected Bismarck's Kulturkampf against the Catholic Church as well as the Anti-Socialist Laws. The German People's Party was the most leftist among non-Marxist parties and closest to the social democracy. It was the sole liberal party to cooperate with the socialists in the Reichstag.

Most of the party's members were craftsmen, small traders, farmers and clerks. However, the leadership consisted of upper-class intellectuals. Leopold Sonnemann (proprietor of the newspaper Frankfurter Zeitung) and the lawyer Friedrich von Payer served as Chairmen. In 1910, the party merged with the Free-minded People's Party and the Free-minded Union to form the Progressive People's Party. A notable member of both the German People's Party, the Progressive People's Party and its successor the German Democratic Party was Ludwig Quidde, the Nobel Peace Prize winner in 1927.

The most influential among the German People's Party's state organisations was the Democratic People's Party in Württemberg. After the German People's Party was disbanded, it continued as the regional branch of the Progressive People's Party, the German Democratic Party and is still part of the full name of the liberal Free Democratic Party in the state of Baden-Württemberg. In contrast to the South German People's Party of 1868–1910, the German People's Party in the Weimar Republic (1919–1933) was a monarchist successor to the imperial National Liberal Party.

== See also ==
- Contributions to liberal theory
- Liberal democracy
- Liberalism
- Liberalism in Germany
- Liberalism worldwide
- List of liberal parties

Preceded by Democratic People's Party	German People's Party; 1868–1910	Succeeded by Progressive People's Party
