= Lückentheorie =

Academic theory

"Lückentheorie" (German pronunciation: [ˈlʏkən.teoˌʁiː], gap theory), is a term proposed by German jurist and politician Friedrich Julius Stahl. It was employed by Otto von Bismarck in order to resolve the constitutional conflict in Prussia from 1862-1866 with the Landtag in the favor of the King. The theory implied that when the Prussian Constitution of 1850 did not come to an agreement on the vote of the budget, there is a legal gap that can be filled by the "monarchical principle". The Lückentheorie affirms the King as the sole one with the power to decide on matters of the Constitution, and that the King could overrule Landtag opposition. Since the Minister President of Prussia belonged to the royal government, as an extension of the King, he was by extension superior to the Landtag in case of conflict.

== Historical uses ==
In 1861, while the liberals dominated the Prussian parliament, a project of military reform was blocked by their opposition. With no conciliatory solution in sight, Otto von Bismarck decided to employ the Lückentheorie in order to circumvent the opposition of the parliament. He announced his decision in his famous "Blood and Iron" speech. He thereby declared:

"The great questions of our times will not be decided by discussions and majority votes, but by blood and iron".

He continued to govern without a legally voted budget for the next four years, despite continuing parliamentary opposition.

== Separation of military and political domain in Prussia ==
It was not by accident that this grave conflict emerged in the military domain, which constituted a particularly sensitive domain in Prussia. As noted by Thomas Nipperdey, in Prussia and in the German Empire afterwards, the king and the Emperor respectively were considered the only common denominator between the army and the political domain. Neither the Chancellor, nor the Minister of War were in charge of supervising the army. The Franco-Prussian war of 1870 and ultimately the First World War highlighted this relationship, with the domination of the Oberste Heeresleitung (OHL) on then-Chancellor Theobald von Bethmann Hollweg.

== End of the theory's historical use ==
After the Austro-Prussian War of 1866, which was ended by Bismarck despite the king's opposition, the Chancellor managed to gain the support of the national liberals. They therefore passed a "law of indemnities" on the military spending of 1862–1866, while showing their recognition to Bismarck for having paved the path for German unity.
