= Landtag of Prussia =

Parliament of Prussia from 1849 to 1934

Coordinates: 52°30′29″N 13°22′55″E

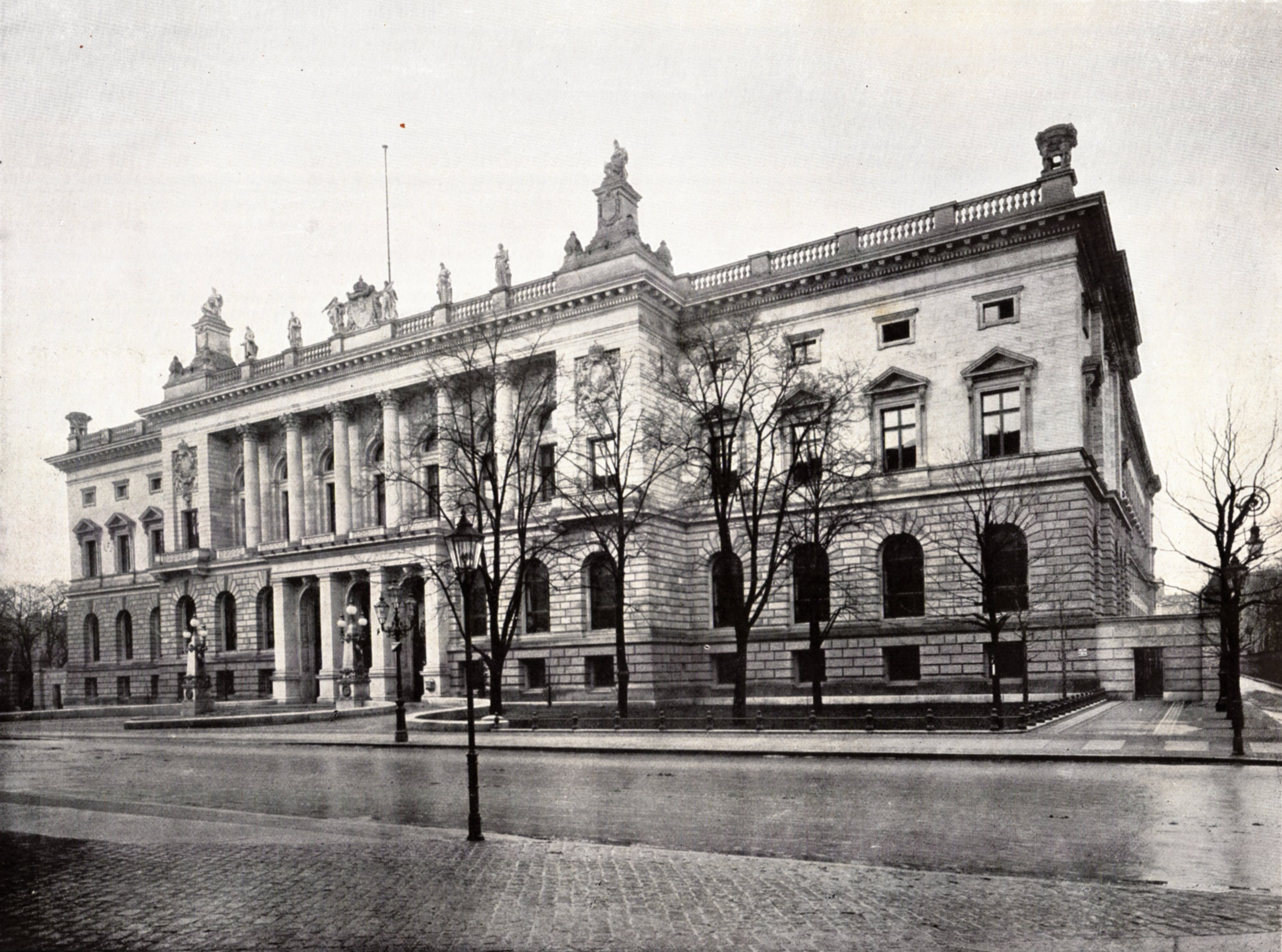
Prussian House of Representatives at Dönhoffplatz, about 1900

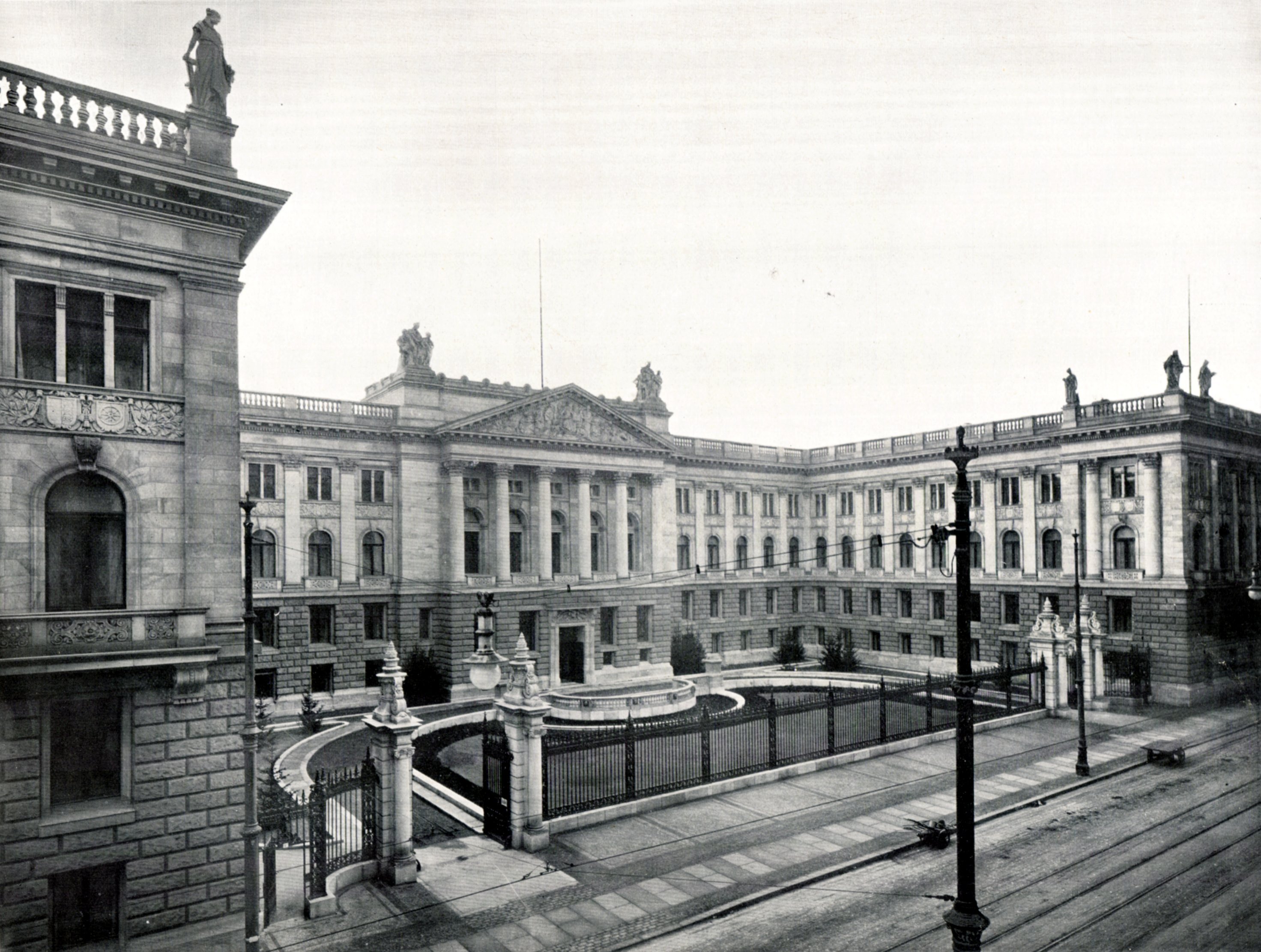
Prussian House of Lords at Leipziger Straße, about 1900

The Landtag of Prussia (German: Preußischer Landtag) was the representative assembly of the Kingdom of Prussia implemented in 1849, a bicameral legislature consisting of the upper House of Lords (Herrenhaus) and the lower House of Representatives (Abgeordnetenhaus). After World War I and the German Revolution of 1918–19 the Landtag diet continued as the parliament of the Free State of Prussia between 1921 and 1934, when it was abolished by the Nazi regime.

== History ==
=== Kingdom of Prussia ===
In the course of the 1848 Revolution, King Frederick William IV of Prussia and his Minister President Gottfried Ludolf Camphausen had agreed to call for the general election of a national assembly in all Prussian provinces. The Prussian National Assembly however was dismissed by royal decree of 5 December 1848 and the King imposed the 1848 Constitution of Prussia. It contained a catalog of fundamental rights that included freedom of religion, speech and the press, and provided for a bicameral parliament consisting of a First Chamber (Erste Kammer, called House of Lords from 1855), as well as a Second Chamber (Zweite Kammer, from 1855 House of Representatives) whose members were elected by universal manhood suffrage according to the three-class franchise system that weighted votes based on amount of taxes paid. Both houses and the King of Prussia had the right to introduce bills, although the king remained the most powerful element in the government. The first Parliament, which met in 1849, modified the constitution in mostly minor ways. The resulting 1850 Constitution of Prussia, amended numerous times, remained Prussia's basic law until 1918.

Under the regency of Prince William I and his liberal prime minister Prince Karl Anton von Hohenzollern from 1858 (the "New Era"), the House of Representatives led by the newly established German Progress Party gradually developed into a serious political actor, culminating in a constitutional conflict in 1861: William I, who had just acceded to the Prussian throne, and his war minister Albrecht von Roon requested approval for an increment of the military budget, which the deputies refused. Roon urged the king to appoint Otto von Bismarck as Minister President. Bismarck acted on an alleged gap in the constitution (Lückentheorie) and openly sidestepped any power of the purse of the Prussian representatives, saying that "not by speeches and votes of the majority are the great questions of the time decided (...) but by iron and blood." The assembly raised a blistering protest and over the following years Bismarck's cabinet had to govern without a government budget passed by the legislature. In September 1866 the Minister President, at a peak of his power after the Battle of Königgrätz, reached the passage of the Indemnity Act (Indemnitätsgesetz) subsequently legalising his budget management. The balloting led to the split-off of the National Liberal Party which became a loyal supporter of Bismarck's policies.

=== Free State of Prussia ===
During the German Revolution of 1918–19 the new Prussian government of Majority Social Democrats (MSPD) and Independent Social Democrats (USPD) under Paul Hirsch had the bicameral legislature abolished. A constitutional convention (Preußische Landesversamlung) was elected on 26 January 1919, after the introduction of equal franchise for all men and women. After the failed Kapp Putsch of 1920, the assembly confirmed the first cabinet of Minister-president Otto Braun and finally adopted the new Prussian constitution on 30 November. The Preußischer Landtag was re-established as the parliament of the Free State of Prussia in 1921. The provinces were represented in the Prussian State Council, which succeeded the former Herrenhaus as a kind of upper house. The Cologne mayor Konrad Adenauer served as its president until 1933.

A legislative period lasted for no longer than four years. The parliament could be dissolved early by joint resolution of the prime minister and the presidents of the Landtag and the State Council or by a plebiscite. In 1931 just such a referendum, intended to dissolve the Prussian Landtag, took place on the initiative of the "Stahlhelm" veterans' organization, with the support of the Nazi Party and the German Communist Party. The referendum failed. Landtag elections took place on 20 February 1921, 7 December 1924, 20 May 1928, 24 April 1932, and 5 March 1933. The last Prussian Landtag convened on 22 March 1933, and again on 18 May 1933 for the final time. A year after coming to power in Germany, the Nazi Party passed the "Law on the Reconstruction of the Reich," effective on 30 January 1934. Directed at replacing the German federal state with a unitary government, this law abolished the Prussian Landtag, along with all other state legislatures.

== Building complex ==
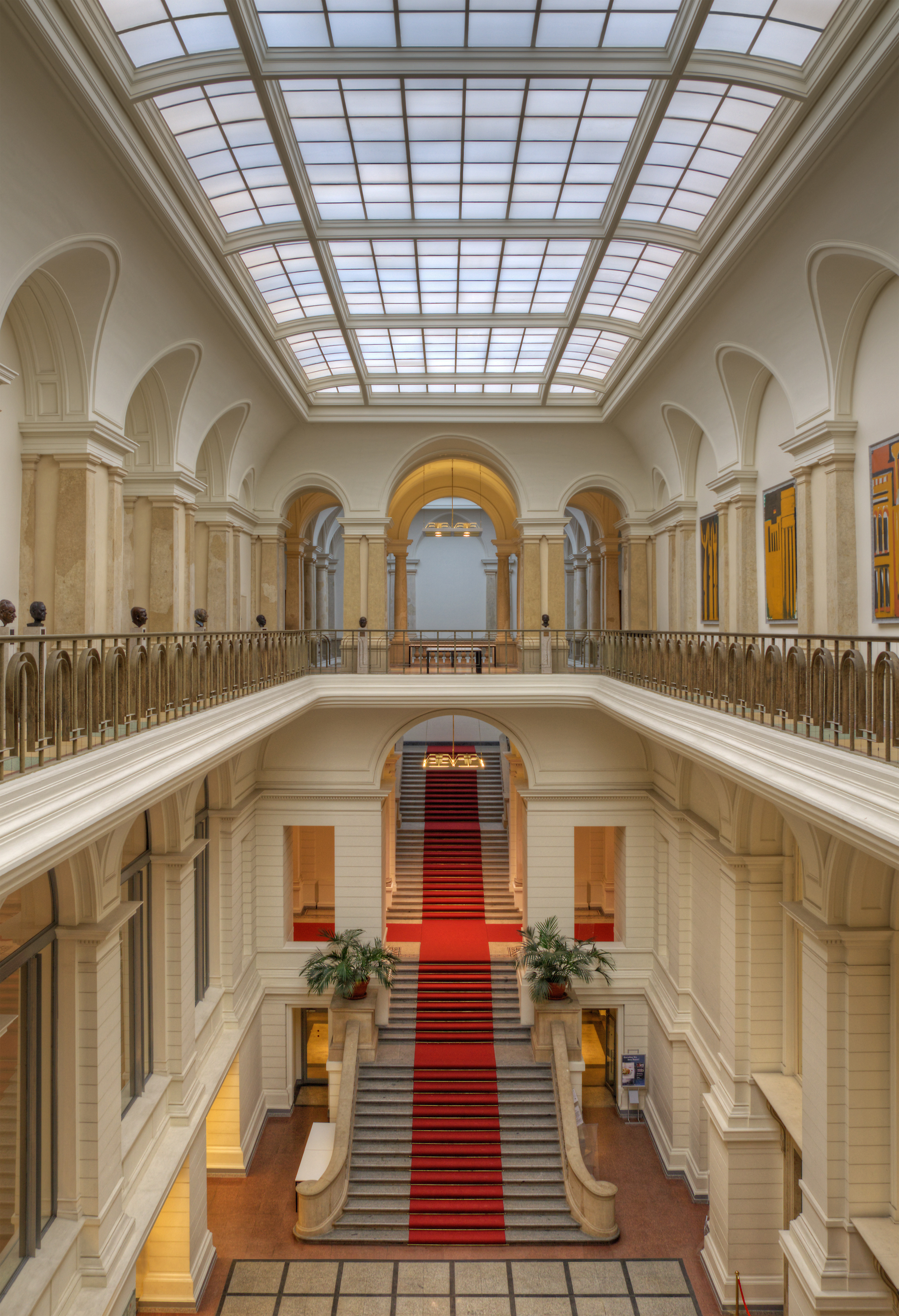
House of Representatives, staircase

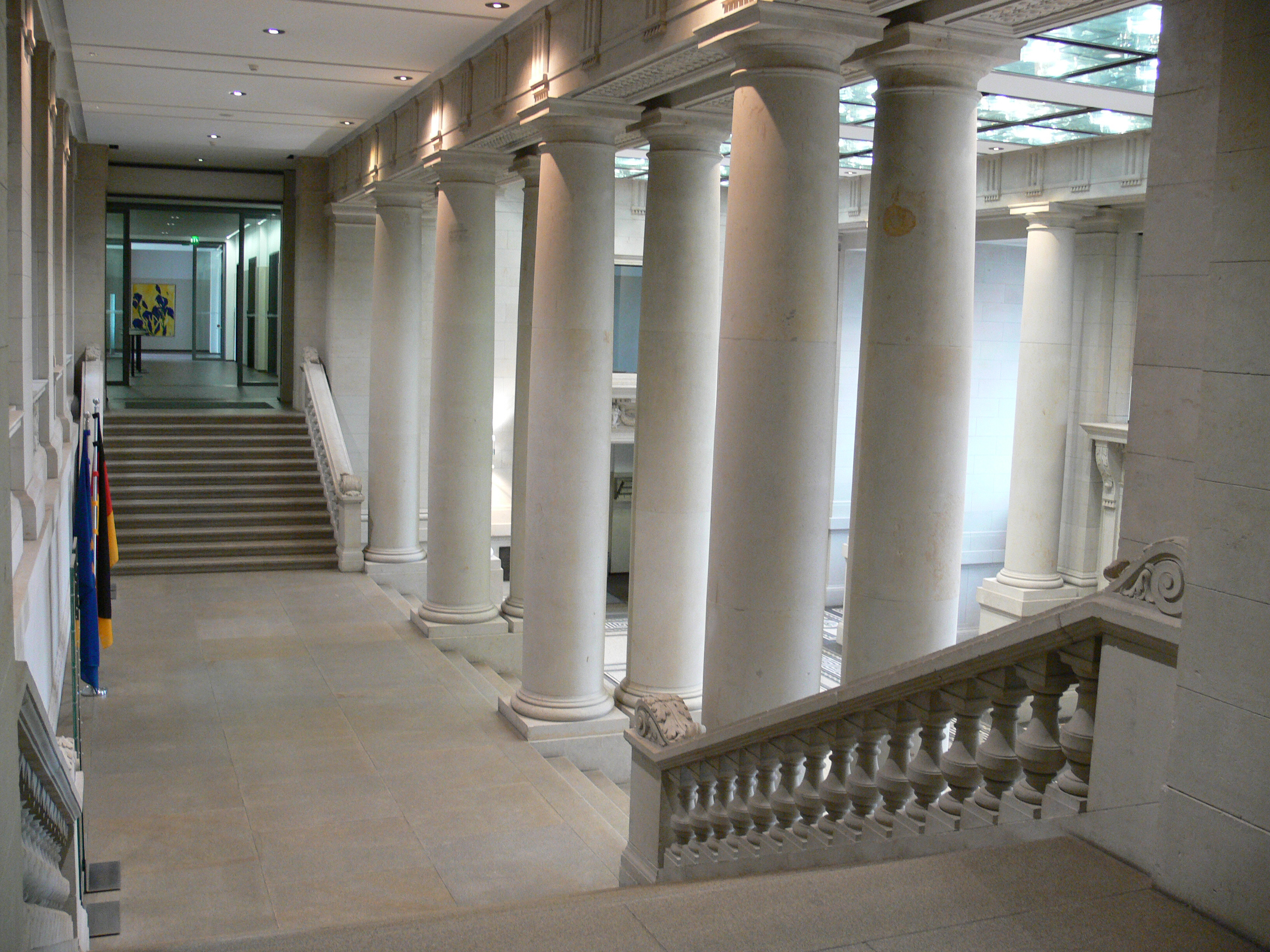
House of Lords, entrance hall

In 1899, the House of Representatives (Abgeordnetenhaus) moved into a building on Prinz-Albrecht-Straße No. 5 (present-day Niederkirchnerstraße), close to Potsdamer Platz and situated opposite to the Martin Gropius Bau. During the German Revolution of 1918–19 the Reichsrätekongress (national Workers' and Soldiers' Council) held its assemblies here from 16 to 20 December 1918. On 1 January 1919, the Communist Party of Germany was founded here. Since 1993 the building has been the seat of the Abgeordnetenhaus of Berlin: colloquially it is still named Preußischer Landtag just as the nearby building accommodating the Bundestag is still generally referred to as the Reichstag.

The seat of the Prussian House of Lords on Leipziger Straße was inaugurated in 1904. Both buildings were built back-to-back according to plans designed by Friedrich Schulze, they intercommunicate via a common restaurant wing. Upon the Nazi Machtergreifung, the Herrenhaus building served as an annex of the neighbouring Ministry of Aviation and Hermann Göring's Preußenhaus foundation. After World War II it housed several departments of the (East) German Academy of Sciences and since 29 September 2000 is the seat of the German Bundesrat.

== Presidents of the Prussian Landtag (Free State of Prussia) ==
Political Party: SPD NSDAP

Portrait	Name	Political Party	Term of Office
President of the Preußische Landesversammlung
	Robert Leinert	Social Democratic Party of Germany	1919–1921
Presidents of the Landtag of Prussia
	Robert Leinert	Social Democratic Party of Germany	1921–1924
	Friedrich Bartels	Social Democratic Party of Germany	1924–1928
	Friedrich Bartels	Social Democratic Party of Germany	1928–1931
	Ernst Wittmaack	Social Democratic Party of Germany	1931–1932
	Hanns Kerrl	National Socialist German Workers' Party	1932–1933
	Hanns Kerrl	National Socialist German Workers' Party	1933

== See also ==
- Elections in the Free State of Prussia
- List of presidents of the State Council of Prussia
- List of presidents of the House of Deputies of Prussia
- Prussian House of Representatives
  - Members of the Prussian House of Representatives
- Prussian House of Lords
  - Members of the Prussian House of Lords

== Bibliography ==
- Hans Wilderotter: Das Haus der Abgeordneten: Ein Denkmal preußischer und deutscher Geschichte in der Mitte Berlins. Philo Fine Arts, Dresden 2001, ISBN 3-364-00378-5
