= Eduard Lasker =

19th-century German politician and jurist

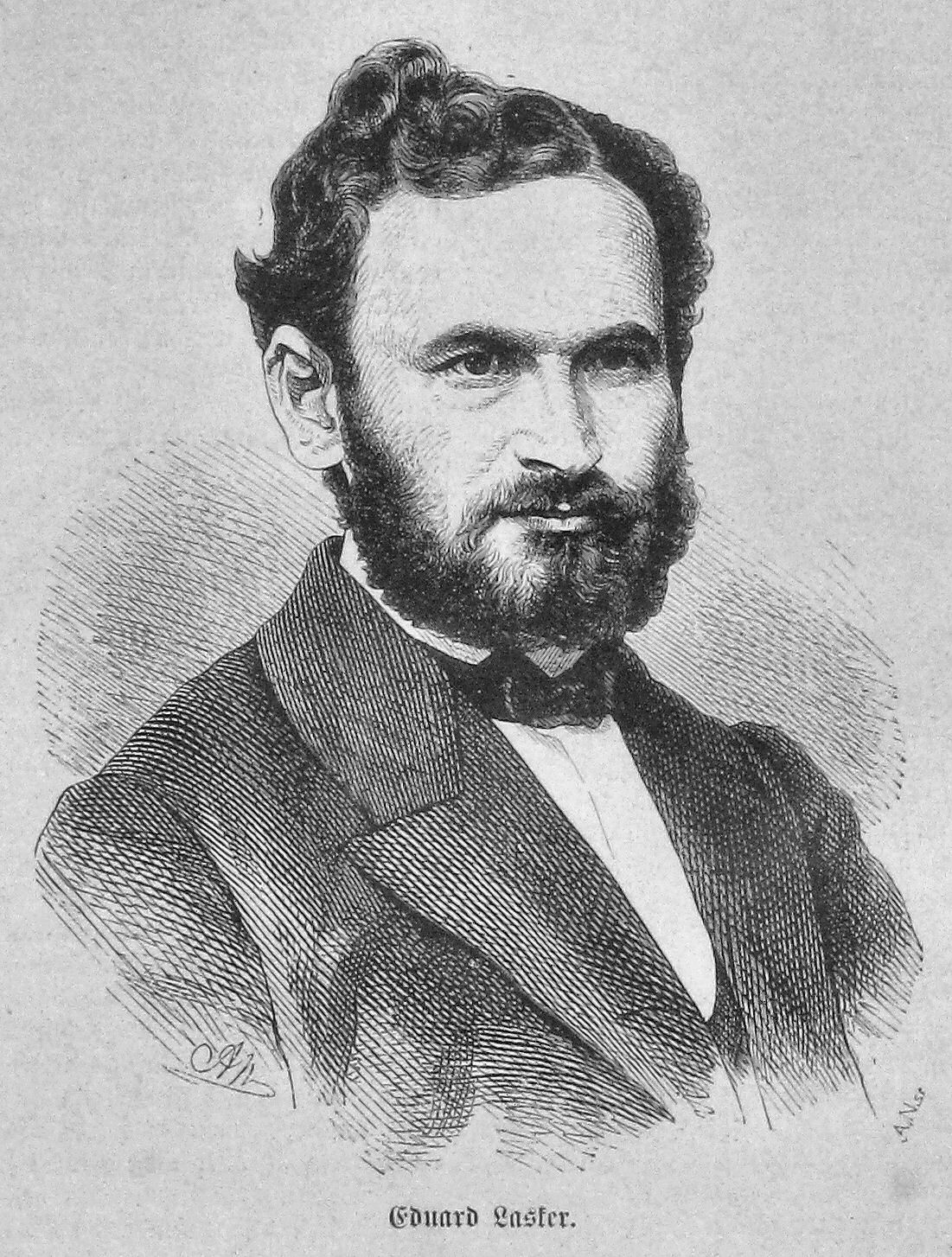
- Portrait of Eduard Lasker

Member of the Reichstag (German Empire)
- In office 21 March 1871 – 5 January 1884
- Constituency: Sachsen-Meiningen 2 (1881–1884); Meiningen 2 (1871–1881)

(North German Confederation)
- In office 1867–1871
- Constituency: Sachsen-Meiningen 2

Personal details
- Born: Jizchak Lasker; 14 October 1829 Jarotschin, Province of Posen, Prussia
- Died: 5 January 1884 (aged 54) New York, New York, United States
- Party: Liberal Union
- Other political affiliations: National Liberal Party
- Occupation: Politician, jurist

Eduard Lasker (born Jizchak Lasker) (14 October 1829 – 5 January 1884) was a German politician and jurist. Inspired by the French Revolution, he became a spokesman for liberalism and the leader of the left wing of the National Liberal party, which represented middle-class professionals and intellectuals. He promoted the unification of Germany during the 1860s and played a major role in codification of the German legal code. Lasker at first compromised with Chancellor Otto von Bismarck, who later strenuously opposed Lasker regarding freedom of the press. In 1881, Lasker left the National Liberal party and helped form the new German Free-minded Party.

== Biography ==
He was born at Jarotschin, a village in Posen, the son of a Jewish tradesman. He attended the gymnasium, and afterwards the University of Breslau. In 1848, after the outbreak of the revolution, he went to Vienna and entered the student's legion which played a prominent role in the disturbances; he fought against the imperial troops during the siege of the city in October. He then continued his legal studies at Breslau and Berlin, and after a visit of three years to England, then the model state for German liberals, entered the Prussian judicial service.

=== National Liberal Party ===
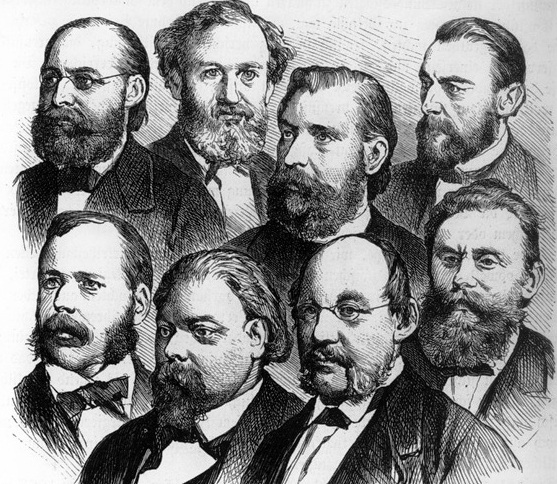
Eduard Lasker (top row, second from left) amongst other leadership figures of the National Liberal Party.

In 1870 he left the government service, and in 1873 was appointed to an administrative post in the service of the city of Berlin. He had been brought to the notice of the political world by some articles he wrote from 1861 to 1864, which were afterwards published under the title Zur Verfassungsgeschichte Preußens (Leipzig, 1874), and in 1865 he was elected member to the Prussian House of Representatives. He joined the radical German Progress Party, and in 1867 was also elected to the German parliament, but he helped to form the National Liberal Party, and in consequence lost his seat in Berlin, which remained faithful to the radicals; after this he represented Magdeburg and Frankfurt in the Prussian, and Meiningen in the German parliament. He threw himself with great energy into his parliamentary duties, and quickly became one of its most popular and most influential members.

After the Battle of Koniggratz. Lasker and the National Liberal Party worked toward building the North German Confederation, and Lasker came to know Bleichroeder, Otto von Bismarck's close financial consultant. Lasker and Bleichroeder were considered friends, and this connection gave rise to rumors in Berlin that Lasker had a financial relationship with Bleichroeder. In December 19, Lasker wrote to Bleichroeder about this gossip: "I am supposed to receiving thousands from you annually, for I don't know what services, and to be concerned particularly with your financial operations....I have always regarded our relations as purely personal and have been honored especially by the tie of personal friendship." He further wrote that he wanted to avoid any suggestion that he may have had any "partiality that was in any way connected with parliamentary activity." The evidence thus suggests that Lasker was scrupulous in separating personal benefit from public office, which was unusual for politician's at that time.

An optimist and idealist, he joined to a fervent belief in liberty an equal enthusiasm for German unity and the idea of the German state. His motion that Baden should be included in the North German Confederation in January 1870 caused much embarrassment to Bismarck, but was not without effect in hastening the crisis of 1870.

=== Judicial reform ===
His great work, however, was the share he took in the judicial reform during the ten years 1867 to 1877. The codification of the law during this period is attributable more to him than to any other single individual. While he again and again was able to compel the government to withdraw or amend proposals that seemed dangerous to liberty, he opposed those liberals who, unable to obtain all the concessions they called for, refused to vote for the new laws as a whole.

=== Breaking with his party ===
A speech made by Lasker on 7 February 1873, in which he attacked the management of the Pomeranian railway, caused a great sensation, and his exposure of the financial mismanagement brought about the fall of Hermann Wagener, one of Bismarck's most trusted assistants. By this action he caused, however, some embarrassment to his party. This is generally regarded as the beginning of the reaction against economic liberalism by which he and his party were to be deprived of their influence. He refused to follow Bismarck in his financial and economic policy after 1878; always unsympathetic to the chancellor, he was now selected for his most bitter attacks.

=== Last years ===
Between the radicals and socialists on the one side and the government on the other, like many of his friends, he was unable to maintain himself. In 1879 he lost his seat in the Prussian parliament; he joined the Secession, but was ill at ease in his new position. Broken in health and spirits by the incessant labors of the time when he did half the work of the Reichstag, he went in 1883 for a tour in America, and died suddenly in New York City in January 1884. Carl Schurz spoke at his New York funeral.

Lasker's death was the occasion of a curious episode, which caused much discussion at the time. The United States House of Representatives adopted a motion of regret, and added to it these words:

That his loss is not alone to be mourned by the people of his native land, where his firm and constant exposition of, and devotion to, free and liberal ideas have materially advanced the social, political and economic conditions of these people, but by the lovers of liberty throughout the world.

This motion was sent through the American minister at Berlin to the German foreign office, with a request that it might be communicated to the president of the Reichstag. It was to ask Bismarck officially to communicate a resolution in which a foreign parliament expressed an opinion in German affairs exactly opposed to that which the emperor at his advice had always followed. Bismarck therefore refused to communicate the resolution, and returned it through the German minister at Washington. Further, Bismarck forbade civil servants and public officers to attend Lasker's funeral.

== Work ==
- Zur Geschichte der parlamentarischen Entwickelung Preußens (Leipzig, 1873)
- Die Zukunft des Deutschen Reichs (Leipzig, 1877)
- Wege und Ziele der Kulturentwicklung (Leipzig, 1881)
- Fünfzehn Jahre parlamentarischer Geschichte 1866-1880 appeared edited by W. Cahn (Berlin, 1902). See also
