= Benedikt Waldeck =

German politician (1802–1870)

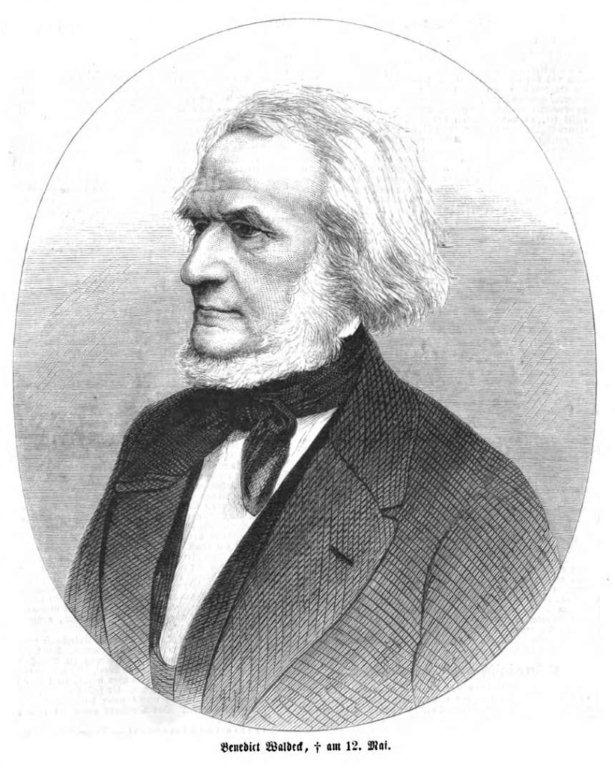
- Born: Benedikt Franz Leo Ignatz Waldeck; 31 July 1802; Münster, Holy Roman Empire
- Died: 12 May 1870 (aged 67); Berlin, Prussia, North German Confederation
- Burial place: Berlin, St. Hedwig's cemetery
- Education: Gymnasium Paulinum in Münster (Abitur); University of Münster; University of Göttingen (PhD, 1822)
- Political party: German Progress Party

Benedikt Franz Leo Ignatz Waldeck (31 July 1802 – 12 May 1870) was a left-leaning deputy in the Prussian National Assembly and later in the Second Chamber of the Landtag of Prussia. He is considered one of the leading left-wing liberals in Prussia during the German revolutions of 1848–1849. In May 1849 he was arrested in Berlin for high treason, but was acquitted in December. Waldeck is an important figure in German constitutional history and in the 1860s he became one of Otto von Bismarck's most important domestic political opponents.

== Life ==
=== Family, education and career ===
His father, Johann Heinrich Waldeck, was a professor of law in Münster. His mother, Gertrudis Lindenkampf, came from a Westphalian patrician family. On 1 August 1802 Benedikt Waldeck was baptised in the Roman Catholic St. Lambert's Church in Münster.

Waldeck attended the Gymnasium Paulinum in Münster, finishing his schooling in 1817. Afterwards he attended philosophical lectures at the University of Münster. He then began studying law at the University of Göttingen in 1819. In 1822 he completed his studies in Göttingen with a doctorate at the age of only 19.

After that he continued his legal training in Münster. In 1828, he passed the major state examination and was appointed Assessor. He then began working as a judge in Halberstadt, Paderborn and Vlotho. During this time he married Juliana Antonetta Catharina Langen in Paderbon in 1832. With her he had nine children, four of whom died young.

From 1836 to 1844 he worked as a judge at the Oberlandesgericht in Hamm. In 1844 he was appointed to the Preußisches Obertribunal, the Prussian Supreme Tribunal, in Berlin.

=== Political activity ===
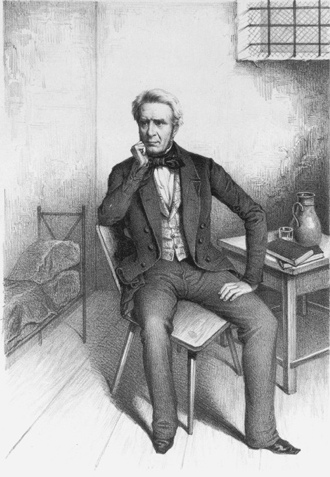
Waldeck in the dungeon, 1849 (contemporary depiction)

In the course of the German revolutions of 1848–1849, Waldeck became politically active. He was elected to the Prussian National Assembly in 1848. After the dissolution of the Prussian National Assembly in 1849, he joined the Second Chamber of the Landtag of Prussia.

In July 1848 he created a liberal constitution for the Kingdom of Prussia, the so-called "Charte Waldeck". A weakened form of this draft was signed by King Frederick William IV of Prussia in December 1848.

In May 1849 he was arrested in Berlin for high treason, but was acquitted in December. Sir John Retcliffe (real name: Hermann Goedsche) was centrally involved in a forgery scandal to discredit Waldeck and then lost his government position for his criminal participation.

Despite his acquittal, Waldeck and other democrats were unable to remain politically active after the failed revolution under the government of Otto Theodor von Manteuffel. However, he was able to retain his position as a judge at the Prussian Supreme Tribunal.

Only after the later King and Emperor William I had taken over the regency in 1858 did Waldeck stand for election again in 1861. This brought him back into the Prussian parliament, where he became one of the leaders of the German Progress Party. In political opposition, he also became one of Bismarck's most important domestic opponents in the 1860s.

Due to a stomach illness, he had to end his political and professional activities.

== Death and afterlife ==
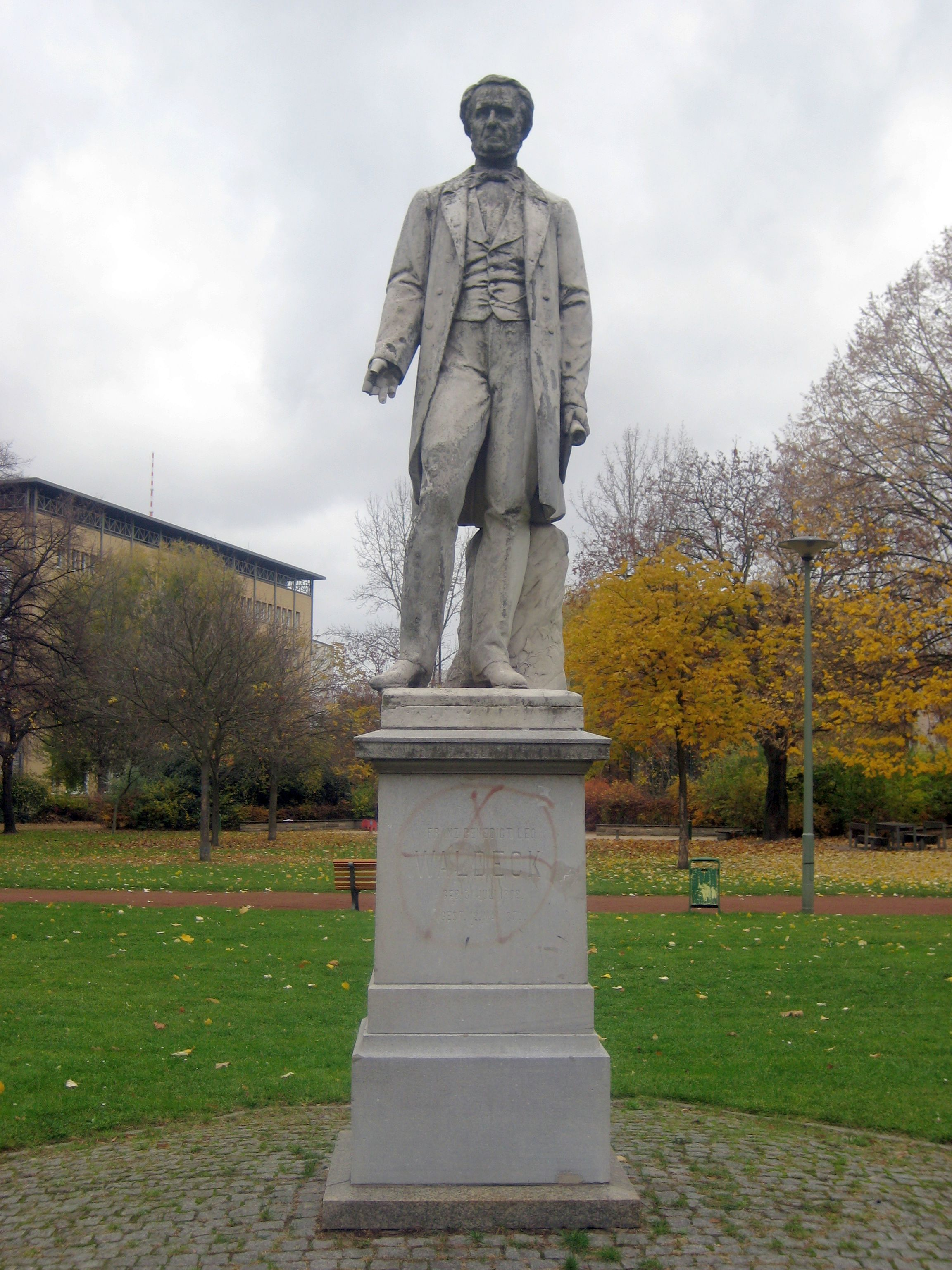
Waldeck-Monument in the Waldeckpark in Berlin-Kreuzberg

His stomach ailment, which is said to have been cancerous, was the cause of his death on 12 May 1870. His funeral in May 1870 was attended by up to 400,000 people, according to some reports. This would have been half the population of Berlin at that time. He was buried at St. Hedwig's Cemetery on Liesenstraße in Berlin. In 1890 a statue was erected in Berlin-Kreuzberg in the Waldeckpark, which is named after him.
