= List of presidents of the House of Deputies of Prussia =

Presidents of the Prussian House of Deputies

| Name | Period |
|---|---|
| Wilhelm Grabow | 1849; 1862-1866 |
| Max von Forckenbeck | 1866–1873 |
| Rudolf von Bennigsen | 1873–1879 |
| Georg von Köller | 1879–1897 |
| Jordan von Kröchen | 1898–1911 |
| Hermann von Erffa | 1912 |
| Hans von Schwerin-Löwitz | 1913–1918 |

== Sources ==
- Pöls, Werner: Grabow, Wilhelm in Neue Deutsche Biographie
- Nordisk Familjebok
- Herzfeld, Hans: Bennigsen, Karl Wilhelm Rudolf von in Neue Deutsche Biographie
- Biographische Handbuch für den Preußische Abgeordnetenhaus 1867-1918 (Edited by Bernhard Mann, assisted by Martin Doerry, Cornelia Rauh and Thomas Kühne), Düsseldorf 1988, ISBN 3-7700-5146-7
