= Johann Jacoby =

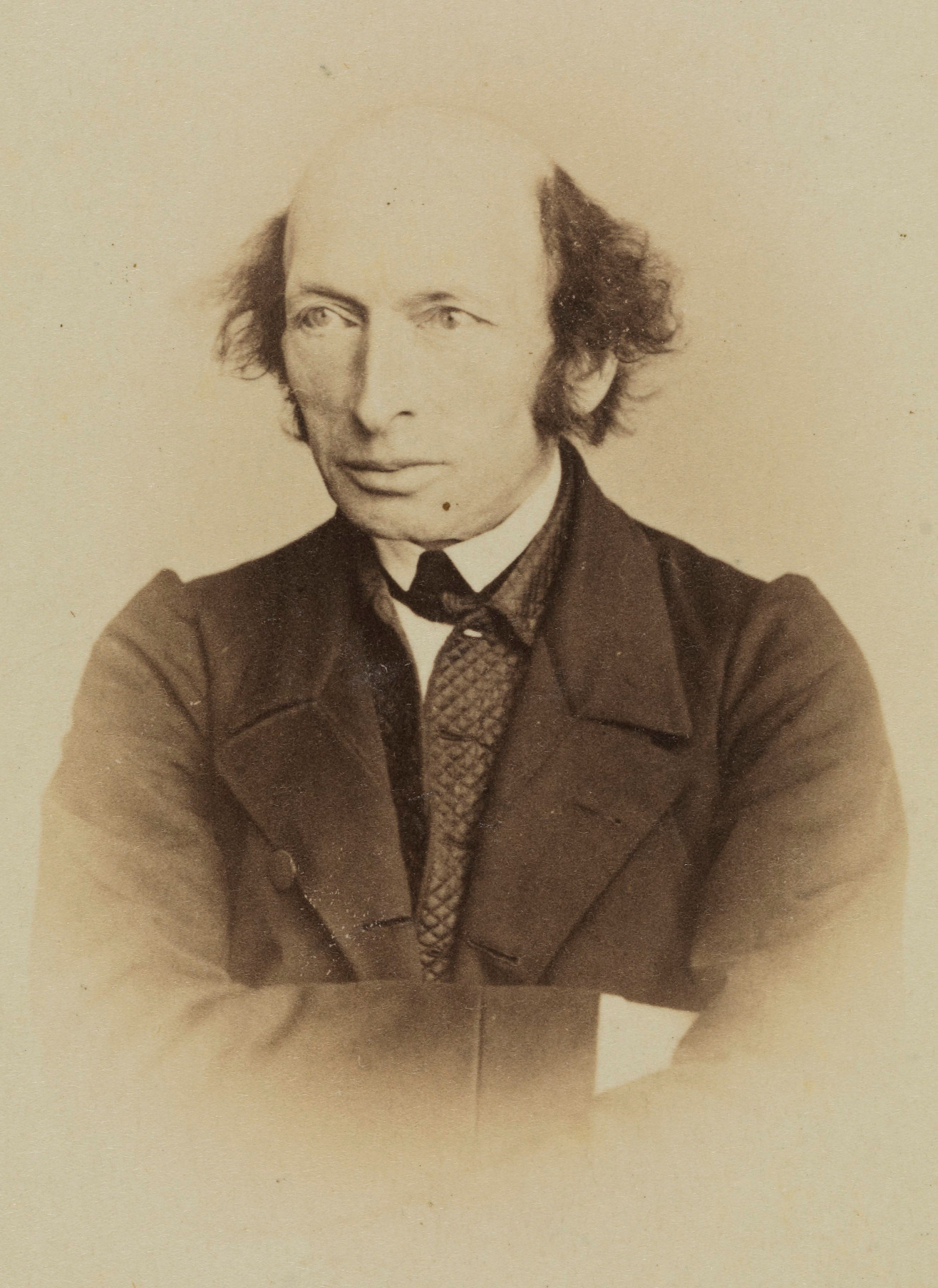
Johann Jacoby

Johann Jacoby (1 May 1805 – 6 March 1877) was a left-liberal German politician. He was also a medical doctor.

== Biography ==
The son of a Jewish Königsberg (now Kaliningrad) merchant, Gerson Jacoby, and his wife, Lea Jonas, Jacoby studied medicine at the Albertina University of Königsberg and in 1830 started practicing in his native city, but soon became involved in political activities in a liberal interest, which involved him in prosecutions and made him well known throughout Germany.

His first published brochures called for Emancipation of the Jews. Unlike some other contemporary writers on that subject, he vehemently held that granting equal right to Jews was not a special favor, but their natural right as human beings.

In later writings he called for reform of the medical services in Prussia, attacked the judicial system which he considered oppressive as well as the state censorship, and upheld "The Right of the Prussian People for a Constitution". These writings got him prosecuted on charges of Lèse majesté, but he was eventually acquitted.

His reputation as a man of fearless honesty was greatly enhanced during the revolutionary upheaval of 1848–1849. He was a delegate in both the Prussian National assembly and the All-German Frankfurt Parliament, and was reckoned among the conspicuous leaders of the Left in both of them.

A particular event connected with his name was when King Frederick William IV of Prussia refused to listen to the criticism made by deputies of the Prussian National Assembly during an audience in 1848. Jacoby, one of the deputies (some accounts described him as leader of the delegation) had the courage to say to the King: It is the misfortune of Kings that they will not listen to the truth!, a saying which got widely published and soon made him very popular in the public.

After the Frankfurt Parliament was dissolved and its members driven out of Frankfurt, Jacoby was among the most radical members, who fled to Stuttgart and there set up a rump parliament with the aim of proclaiming a German republic – considered at the time a highly revolutionary idea. After this body was dissolved by the Württemberg military, Jacoby was prosecuted again for his membership in it, but was acquitted.

Later, Jacoby distinguished himself as an outspoken opponent of Otto von Bismarck. As a member of the Prussian Legislature he was in the radical left of the German Progress Party. In 1864 he delivered, in the presence of the King, a strong anti-Bismarck speech calling for tax refusal. For that, he was prosecuted and served six months behind bars.

Unlike other German Liberals, whose attitudes towards the "Iron Chancellor" were mollified after Bismarck's success in achieving the Unification of Germany, Jacoby remained steadfast in opposing Bismarck's warlike policies and was especially conspicuous in protesting against the annexation of Alsace-Lorraine, for which he was again imprisoned.

After the creation of the new German Empire, he joined the German Social Democratic Party. In 1874, three years before his death, he was elected on its behalf to the Reichstag but demonstratively refused to take his seat as an act of political protest.

Jacoby was also involved in internal Jewish affairs. Among other things, in 1838 he had been a member of a commission appointed by the Königsberg Jewish Community to look into reforms in public worship at the synagogue. However, his reputation is mainly as a Prussian and German political activist dealing with general German political and social issues. He died in Königsberg.

== Jacoby on Direct Democracy ==
Jacoby's contributions to direct democracy are not well documented but several sources can be found. In general he had a positive view on direct democracy e.g. in his speeches (Gesammelten Reden und Schriften von 1872):

- According to his view, final decisions must be made by the whole sovereign/population (Bd. 2, S. 25)
- Citizens have a right to participate decisively in every aspect of lawmaking (Bd. 2, S. 56)
- He wanted: selfgovernment, participation on all public affairs, generall and direct participation in lawmaking and government by the people (May, 28th 1868, Bd. 2, Sl 336–339)
- Citizens are sovereign if the law and administration depends on the direct approval and decision (June, 17th 1868, Bd. 2, S. 340–342)
- Self-government is not the discussion on each phrase of a law and its formulation but the right to adopt or repeal or revise a law! (Bd. 2, S. 341)

== Literature in German ==
- Adam, R.: "Johann Jacobys politischer Werdegang". In: Historische Zeitschrift 143, 1931.
- Engelmann, Bernt: Die Freiheit. Das Recht. Johann Jacoby und die Anfänge unserer Demokratie. Goldmann München 1987
- ibid., "Johann Jacoby. Ein Radikaler im öffentlichen Dienst". In: Barmer, Wilfried (Hrsg.): Literatur in der Demokratie. Für Walter Jens zum 60. Geburtstag, München 1983, S. 345–354.
- Hamburger, Ernst: Juden im öffentlichen Leben Deutschlands. Regierungsmitglieder, Beamte und Parlamentarier in der monarchischen Zeit 1848–1918. Tübingen, 1968.
- Helms, Hans G.: "Johann Jacoby – ein liberaler Politiker des Vormärz in der Bismarck-Ära". In: Zeitschrift für Marxistische Erneuerung. Vierteljahresschrift. Forum Marxistische Erneuerung e. V. (FFM), IMSF e. V. (Hrsg.), Heft 35, S. 97–109, 1998.
- Matull, Wilhelm: "Johann Jacoby und Eduard von Simson. Ein Vergleich". In: Jahrbuch der Albertus-Universität zu Königsberg/Pr., von Hoffmann, Friedrich/ Selle, Götz von. Bd. 21, 1971, S. 18–35)
- Mayer, Dr. Gustaf, "Die Anfänge des politischen Radikalismus im vormärzlichen Preußen". In: Zeitschrift für Politik (1913), Bd. 6, Berlin, S. 1–91.
- Silberner, Edmund: Johann Jacoby. Politiker und Mensch. Bonn-Bad Godesberg: Neue Gesellschaft 1976
- Weber, Rolf: Johann Jacoby. Eine Biographie. Köln, 1988.
