= Leopold Sonnemann =

German journalist and publisher (1831–1909)

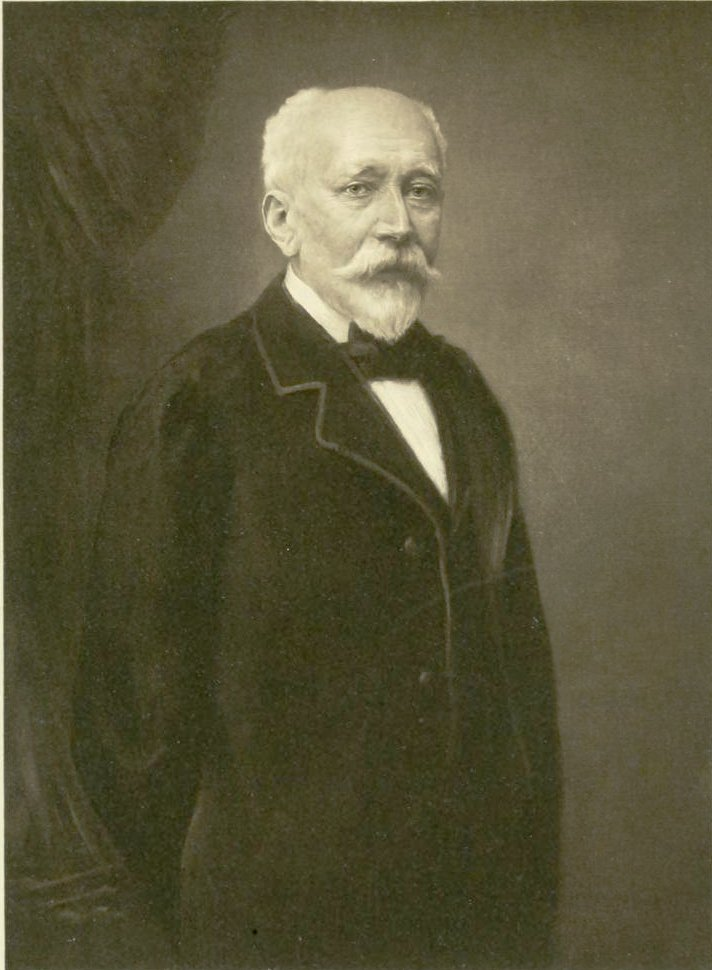
Sonnemann was "a large, portly man, with whiskers like Lord Dundreary," wrote an English contemporary, but "he dresses with a neatness and elegance quite un-Teutonic."

Leopold Sonnemann (29 October 1831 – 30 October 1909) was a German journalist, newspaper publisher, and political party leader during the periods of the North German Confederation and the German Empire. Publisher and editor of the Frankfurter Zeitung, Sonnemann also served as a deputy to the Reichstag and was a founding member of the German People's Party.

== Career ==
Leopold Sonnemann was born to Jewish parents in Höchberg, Bavaria, in 1831. Well-educated in his youth, he became an astute businessman and organizer. He built upon his family business and amassed enough wealth by 1856 to purchase a Bavarian market publication, the Neue Frankfurter Zeitung. Rechristening it to simply Frankfurter Zeitung, Sonnemann devoted himself wholeheartedly to the paper as owner, editor, and contributing writer. The paper developed an influential position in the business community of southern Germany.

Sonnemann was an active organizer and an effective orator. Though he could be clinically described as a social democrat, Sonnemann projected a highly individualized political presence which was regarded by contemporaries as somewhat esoteric. He helped to found the German People's Party in 1868 and, from 1871, served as its first delegate to the Reichstag.

== Legacy ==
The Frankfurter Zeitung was kept running by Sonnemann's coterie, providing an alternative national media outlet for the German left. It survived precariously after the Nazi assumption of power, but was finally acquired by a subsidiary of the Nazi publishing organ, Eher Verlag, in 1938, and ultimately closed by Adolf Hitler's orders in August, 1943.
