= John Prince-Smith =

German politician (1809–1874)

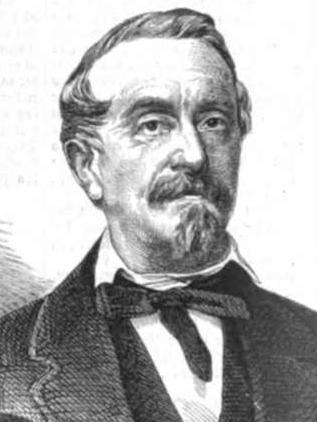
- Born: 20 January 1809; London, England
- Died: 3 February 1874 (aged 65)
- Education: Eton College
- Occupation: Politician

John Prince-Smith (London, 20 January 1809 – Berlin, 3 February 1874) was an English-born, German free trade liberal and politician.

== Life ==
Prince-Smith was born in London, England, where his well to do father worked as a barrister. John grew up in British Guiana, then went to Eton in 1820, but after his father's death two years later, he found work in various jobs as an apprentice. In 1830, he moved to Hamburg, and found work in Elbing, where he worked from 1831 to 1840 as an English language teacher.

He then moved to Berlin. The (liberal) merchants in the port cities of Prussia suffered from the protectionist measures of the Zollverein, and Prince-Smith soon found himself politically involved, becoming one of the more outspoken proponents of Manchester capitalism free trade. Prince-Smith believed protectionist tariffs to be harmful in general, and argued that worldwide free trade would lead to universal peace. With the advent of the Anti-Corn Law League in Britain in the 1840s, a likewise movement was started in the Prussian port cities. Prince-Smith became mentor of such later free traders as Julius Faucher and Max Wirth. In 1860, at an economic conference in Cologne, the free trade movement was successful in getting essential reforms put forth to the Zollverein.

Prince-Smith was elected to the first Reichstag in 1870.
