= Ludwig von Rochau =

German journalist and politician

August Ludwig von Rochau (20 August 1810 in Wolfenbüttel – 15 October 1873 in Heidelberg) was a German journalist and politician. He engaged in the Frankfurter Wachensturm of 1833 and subsequently spent ten years of exile in France. He published the famous Grundsätze der Realpolitik, angewendet auf die staatlichen Zustände Deutschlands ("Practical Politics: an Application of its Principles to the Situation of the German States") in 1853.

== Biography ==
Rochau was born out of wedlock in northern Germany in 1810. Rochau studied law, history, and political science in Jena and Göttingen. He was among the fifty students who stormed the Hauptwache (guard house or police headquarters) in Frankfurt. After the failure of the uprising, Rochau was arrested and condemned to prison for life. However, his friends helped him escape to France, where he lived in exile for the next ten years and wrote essays for liberal German newspapers. He operated as a political journalist during the Revolutions of 1848. With the restoration of power by Otto von Bismarck and King Frederick William IV of Prussia in Berlin, Rochau fled to Italy. From Heidelberg in 1853, he wrote his most famous essay, the Principles of Realpolitik.

In 1869 he became a deputy to the North German Reichstag following a by-election, and was elected to the first German Reichstag in 1871, as a member of the National Liberal Party.

== Writings ==
Rochau wrote eleven books, his most celebrated of those being Grundsätze der Realpolitik (1853). An expanded version of the book was re-published in 1869.

=== English translation ===
- Realpolitik, translated by Victor Van Brandt, Perth, Australia, Imperium Press, 2026.
