= German National Association =

Organization

The German National Association, or German National Union (German: Deutscher Nationalverein) was a liberal political organisation, precursor of a party, in the German Confederation that existed from 1859 to 1867. It was formed by liberals and moderate democrats and aimed at forming a liberal, parliamentary Lesser German ("kleindeutsch"), Prussia-led national state.

== Establishment ==
The league's representatives came from the educated middle and upper classes. The establishment has to be seen against the background of the Prussian "New Era" politics under prince regent William with slight liberalisations and concessions to the bourgeoisie that started in 1858. Liberals and democrats, who met separately until 1859, united on 14 August 1859 in Eisenach and drafted the 2nd Eisenach Declaration calling for nationwide elections, creation of a central authority and end of the confederation. If necessary, the diplomatic and military powers of the German Confederation should be transferred to the Prussian government.

Prominent members included Rudolf von Bennigsen, Schulze-Delitzsch, and Ludwig von Rochau. Feodor Streit, an outspoken democrat, was the society's executive secretary until 1865.

The official foundation took place in Frankfurt on 15/16 October 1859. While the organisational structure was established, the association fund-raised to buy up the German fleet (Reichsflotte) of 1848 to forward the unification. After successful raising, the funds were given to Prussian minister of War Albrecht von Roon.

== End of "New Era" ==
When the moderate liberal "New Era" in Prussia ended in 1862, and the Prussian government refrained from any steps to German unification, the German National Assembly had to change its strategy. The new minister-president Otto von Bismarck aggravated the Prussian constitutional conflict concerning the army reform by ignoring the rights of the parliament, and the liberal organisation could not longer sympathise with the Prussian government. In 1862 the National union raised the democratic constitution of 1849 (Paulskirchenverfassung) to its political programme, illustrating the organisation's swing to the left.

Parallel, in 1861 the National association established the German Progress Party (Deutsche Fortschritsspartei, or DFP) as a registered party in Prussia, constituting the society's "executive branch". In many South and Central German small and middle states Progress Parties were founded in the following years. The DFP was immediately successful in the Prussian parliamentary election. The strategy was to exert pressure to the German states' governments on a parliamentary way to promote German unification.

The union got into a crisis during the Schleswig crisis. The "Committee of 36", close to the National union, strived for a reconquest of Schleswig and Holstein by nationalist volunteer forces. But Bismarck decided to ally with Austria, and their regular armies conquered the territories. So, the liberals' agitation was duped.

== Dissolution ==
During the Austro-Prussian War and the foundation of the North German Confederation, the conflict between the left liberals and National liberals inside the union grew more and more heavy on the question whether or not to seek a compromise with Bismarck. Ultimately the right wing decided to accept the Indemnity bill (Indemnitätsvorlage) in 1866, leading to the final split of the left liberal, staunchly oppositional German Progress Party and the pro-government National Liberal Party, that was established in 1867. Thus, the German National Association ceased to exist.

== See also ==
- Liberalism in Germany
