= German Progress Party =

German Progress Party Deutsche Fortschrittspartei
- Leaders: Hans Victor von Unruh, Johann Jacoby, Adolph Diesterweg, Eugen Richter, Rudolf Virchow, Albert Hänel & Albert Traeger.
- Founded: 6 June 1861; 164 years ago
- Dissolved: 5 March 1884; 142 years ago
- Preceded by: Old Liberal group, German National Association
- Merged into: German Free-minded Party
- Headquarters: Berlin
- Newspaper: Der Volksfreund (1868–1872), Der Reichsfreund (1882–1884)
- Ideology: Liberalism (German); Federalism
- Political position: Left-wing
- Colours: Yellow

The German Progress Party (German: Deutsche Fortschrittspartei, DFP) was the first modern political party in Germany, founded by liberal members of the Prussian House of Representatives (Abgeordnetenhaus) in 1861 in opposition to Minister President Otto von Bismarck.

== History ==
Upon the failed Revolutions of 1848, several deputies in the Landtag diet of Prussia maintained the idea of constitutionalism as it had been developed in the Vormärz era. In the 1850s, these Old Liberals gathered in a parliamentary group around Georg von Vincke, an originally conservative Prussian official and landowner (Junker). Vincke, former member of the Frankfurt Parliament, a polished orator and firebrand, had fallen out with Prime Minister Otto Theodor von Manteuffel over his reactionary policies and in 1852 even fought a duel with Bismarck after a heated verbal exchange in parliament (both men missed).

When under the regency of William I of Prussia from 1858 the Prussian policies of the new era turned towards a more centrist stance, a left-wing group under Max von Forckenbeck seceded and allied with members of the German National Association to form the German Progress Party. The founders were Rudolf Virchow, Theodor Mommsen, Werner von Siemens, Benedict Waldeck, Hermann Schulze-Delitzsch, Hans Victor von Unruh, Wilhelm Loewe and Johann Jacoby.

In its program, the party responded to the German Question by proposing the unification of the German states with the central power in Prussia (Kleindeutsche Lösung, unification without Austria). It demanded representative democracy—though not universal suffrage—implementation of the rule of law and larger responsibility for the local government. Before the rise of the Social Democrats, it was the main left-wing party in Germany and it was also the first German party with its candidates and deputies acting on a common party platform.

Supported by the rising bourgeois middle class, the Progressives had the largest group in the Prussian Lower House between 1861 and 1865. In 1862, their refusal to furthermore pass the government budget for a re-organisation of the Prussian Army instigated by War Minister Albrecht von Roon led to the resignation of the centrist Prime Minister Karl Anton, Prince of Hohenzollern. On the verge of his abdication, King William was persuaded by Roon to appoint the young conservative Otto von Bismarck Prussian Minister President. Bismarck ignored the parliament's blockade by proclaiming his Lückentheorie ("gap theory"), whereafter in a deadlock situation between the king and the assembly, for want of provision by the Prussian Constitution, the decision of the monarch had to tip the balance.

Bismarck was able to keep the public indignation covered, accompanied by his famous "Blood and Iron" speech in the Prussian Abgeordnetenhaus. He continued to rule against the parliamentary majority while the parliament members of the Progressive Party found themselves unable to overthrow his government. Upon the Prussian victory at the Battle of Königgrätz ending the Austro-Prussian War in 1866, Bismarck initiated a law confirming the parliament's power of the purse, but also granting an amnesty for the arbitrary conduct of his government. Meant as an attempt for reconciliation, a vast majority of the parliament approved it, but the liberals were at strife among themselves and the Progressive Party finally split apart—the right-wing which supported Bismarck's policy seceded to form the National Liberal Party in 1867 while a democratic-republican wing in Southern Germany seceded to form German People's Party in 1868.

The remaining Progressive parliament members under Benedict Waldeck principally supported Bismarck's formation of the North German Confederation, directed at the establishment of a Prussian-led German nation state, though they rejected the Imperial Constitution of 1871 as undemocratic. In the first federal election of 1871, the party gained 8.8% of the votes cast and 46 seats in the Reichstag parliament, largely outnumbered by its National Liberal rivals. Later on, the Progressives approached towards the policy of the new Chancellor. To characterize Bismarck's politics toward the Catholic Church, the pathologist and parliament member Rudolf Virchow used the term Kulturkampf the first time on 17 January 1873 in the Prussian House of Representatives. In the later years of Bismarck's incumbency, the Progressives again kept their distance to his government. Under the new board of Eugen Richter, Ludwig Loewe, Albert Hänel and Albert Traeger, the party developed to a pan-German liberal democratic party, rejecting Bismarck's Anti-Socialist Laws as well as his free trade restrictions. In the federal election of 1881, the Progress Party reached its best results ever with 12.7% of the votes cast and 56 seats in the Reichstag, becoming the second strongest faction after the Catholic Centre Party.

To unite the left-wing liberal forces, the party finally merged on 5 March 1884 with the Liberal Union (a splinter of the National Liberals) into the German Free-minded Party.

== See also ==
- Contributions to liberal theory
- Liberal democracy
- Liberalism worldwide
- List of liberal parties
