= Rudolf von Bennigsen =

German politician (1824–1902)

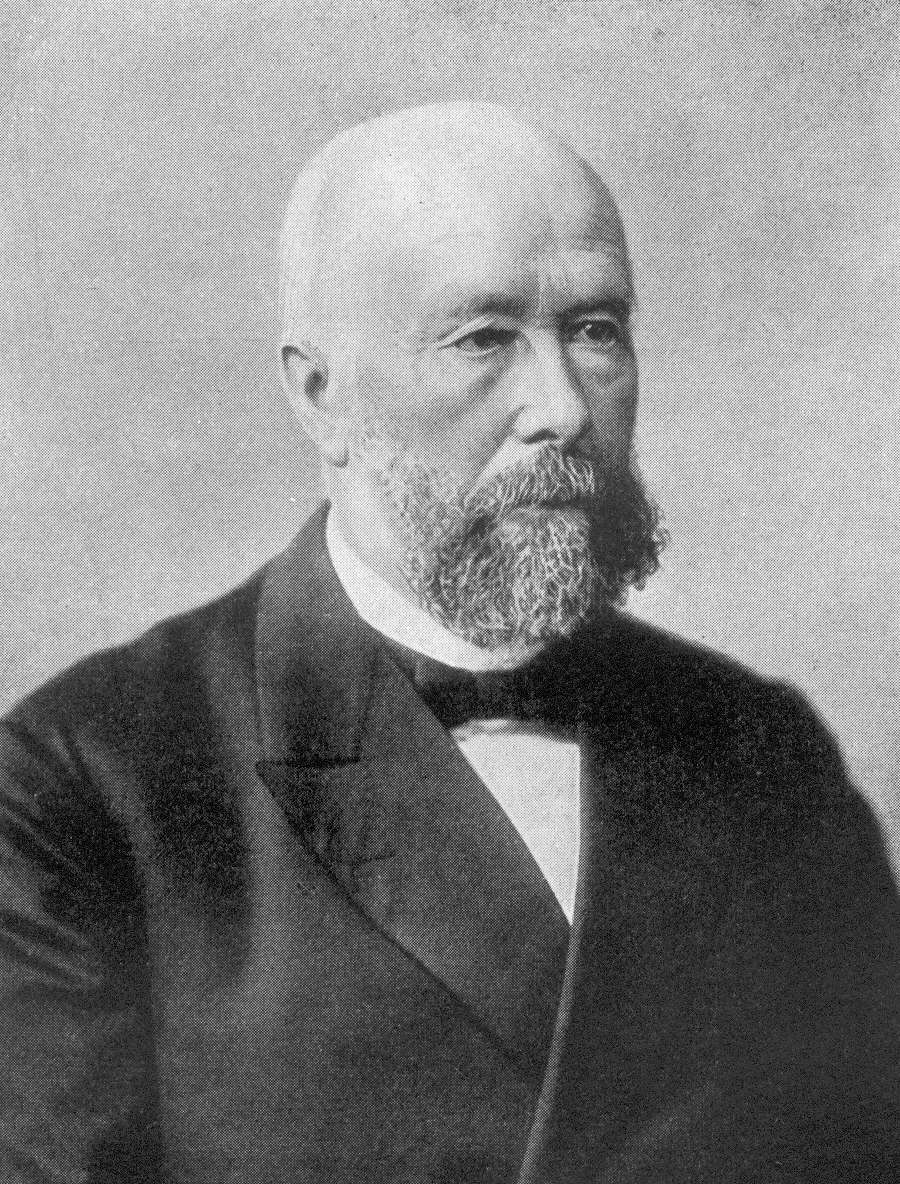
- Bennigsen in 1900

Personal details
- Born: Karl Wilhelm Rudolf von Bennigsen; 10 July 1824 Lüneburg, Kingdom of Hanover
- Died: 7 August 1902 (aged 78) Bennigsen, Province of Hanover, Kingdom of Prussia, German Empire
- Party: National Liberal Party

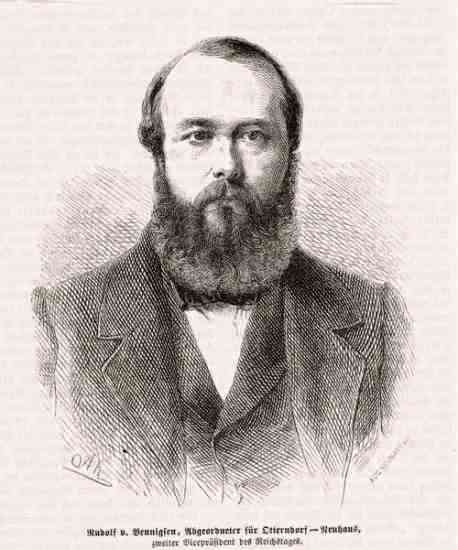
Bennigsen in 1871

Karl Wilhelm Rudolf von Bennigsen (10 July 1824 – 7 August 1902) was a German politician descended from an old Hanoverian family.

== Biography ==
Bennigsen was born at Lüneburg on 10 July 1824. He was descended from an old Hanoverian family, his father, Karl von Bennigsen, was an officer in the Hanoverian Army who rose to the rank of general and also held diplomatic appointments. The anthropologist Moritz von Leonhardi was his nephew.

After studying at the University of Göttingen, where he became a member of the Corps Hannovera, Bennigsen entered the Hanoverian civil service. In 1855, he was elected a member of the second chamber, and because the government refused to allow him leave of absence from his official duties, he resigned his post in the public service. He at once became the recognized leader of the Liberal opposition to the reactionary government, but should be distinguished from Alexander Levin, Count of Bennigsen, a member of the same family and son of the distinguished Russian General Bennigsen, who was also one of the parliamentary leaders at the time, serving as Hanover's minister-president between 1848 and 1850 and afterwards as president first of the first chamber, then of the second chamber of the Estates Assembly of the Kingdom of Hanover (parliament).

What gave Bennigsen his importance not only in Hanover, but throughout the whole of Germany, was the foundation of the German National Association, which was due to him, and of which he was president. This society, which arose out of the public excitement created by the Austro-Sardinian War, had for its object the formation of a national party which should strive for the unity and the constitutional liberty of the whole Fatherland. It united the moderate Liberals throughout Germany, and at once became a great political power, notwithstanding all the efforts of the governments, and especially of King George V of Hanover to suppress it. Bennigsen was also one of the founders of the Protestantenverein in 1863.

In 1866 Bennigsen, then leader of the liberal opposition in the second chamber of the Estates Assembly, used all his influence to keep Hanover neutral in the Austro-Prussian War, but in vain. He took no part in the war, but his brother, who was an officer in the Prussian Army, was killed in Bohemia. In May of this year he had an important interview with Bismarck, who wished to secure his support for the reform of the German Confederation, and after the war was over at once accepted the position of a Prussian subject, taking his seat in the diet (parliament) of the North German Confederation and in the Prussian House of Representatives. He used his influence to procure as much autonomy as possible for the province of Hanover, but was a strong opponent of the Guelph Party. He was one of the three Hanoverians, Ludwig Windthorst and Johann von Miquel being the other two, who at once won for the representatives of the conquered province the lead in both the Prussian and North German parliaments. The Nationalverein, its work being done, was now dissolved; but Bennigsen was chiefly instrumental in founding a new political party, the National Liberals, who, while they supported Bismarck's national policy, hoped to secure the constitutional development of the country.

For the next thirty years Bennigsen was president of the party, and was the most influential of the parliamentary leaders. It was chiefly owing to him that the building up of the internal institutions of the empire was carried on without the open breach between Bismarck and the parliament, which was often imminent. Many amendments suggested by him were introduced in the debates on the constitution; in 1870 he undertook a mission to Southern Germany to strengthen the national party there, and was consulted by Bismarck while at Versailles. It was he who brought about the compromise on the military bill in 1874. In 1877 he was offered the post of vice-chancellor with a seat in the Prussian ministry, but refused it because Bismarck or the king would not agree to his conditions. From this time his relations with the government were less friendly, and in 1878 he brought about the rejection of the first Socialist Bill.

In 1883 he resigned his seat in parliament owing to the reactionary measures of the government, which made it impossible for him to continue his former co-operation with Bismarck, but returned in 1887 to support the coalition of national parties. One of the first acts of the Emperor Wilhelm II was to appoint him Oberpräsident of the Province of Hanover. In 1897 he resigned this post and retired from public life. He died on 7 August 1902.
