= Blood and Iron (speech) =

1862 speech by Otto von Bismarck

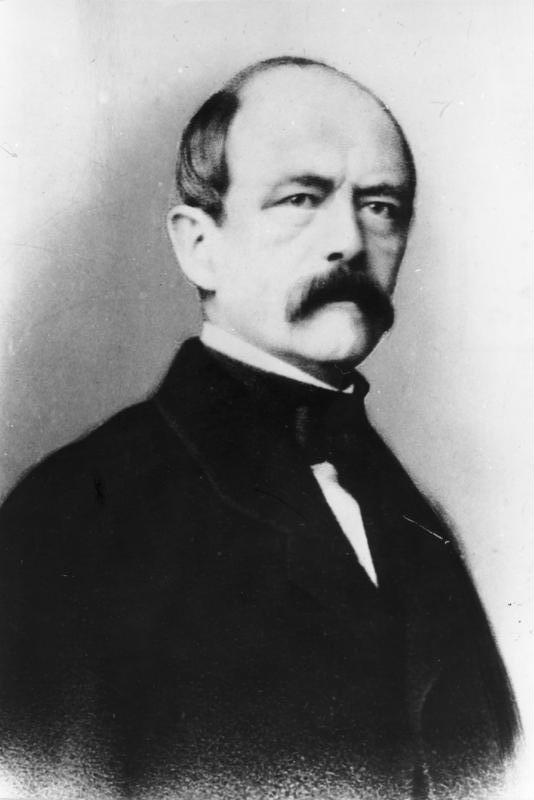
Minister President Bismarck, 1862

Blood and Iron (German: Blut und Eisen) is the name given to a speech made by Otto von Bismarck given on 30 September 1862, at the time when he was Minister President of Prussia, about the unification of the German territories. It is also a transposed phrase that Bismarck uttered near the end of the speech that has become one of his most widely known quotations.

In September 1862, when the Prussian House of Representatives were refusing to approve an increase in military spending desired by King Wilhelm I, the monarch appointed Bismarck Minister President and Foreign Minister. A few days later, Bismarck appeared before the House's Budget Committee and stressed the need for military preparedness to solve the German Question. He concluded his speech with the following statement:

The position of Prussia in Germany will not be determined by its liberalism but by its power [...] Prussia must concentrate its strength and hold it for the favourable moment, which has already come and gone several times. Since the treaties of Vienna, our frontiers have been ill-designed for a healthy body politic. Not through speeches and majority decisions will the great questions of the day be decided—that was the great mistake of 1848 and 1849—but by iron and blood (Eisen und Blut).

This phrase, relying on a patriotic poem written by Max von Schenkendorf during the Napoleonic Wars, was popularized as the more euphonious Blut und Eisen ("Blood and Iron"), and became symbolic of Bismarckian Machtpolitik ("Power politics").

Although Bismarck was an outstanding diplomat, the phrase "blood and iron" has become a popular description of his foreign policy partly because he did on occasion resort to war to further the unification of Germany and the expansion of its continental power. Therefore, he became known as "the iron chancellor."

There is a recent spate of books, that are variously titled with the words "blood" and "iron" in their title, albeit sometimes reversed,—reflecting a common long standing and evolving linguistic meme.
