= National Liberal Party (Germany) =

National Liberal Party Nationalliberale Partei
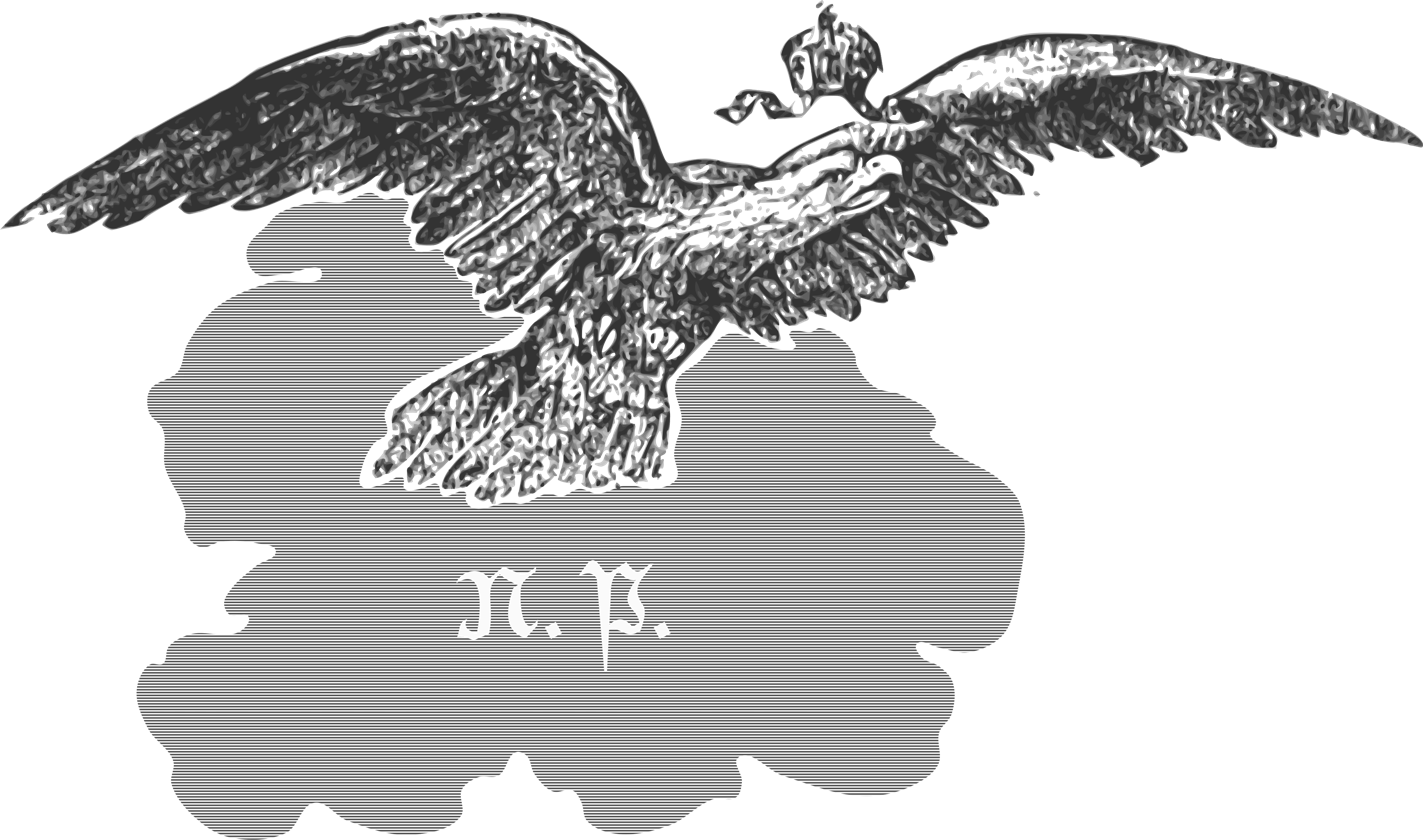
- Historic Leaders: Wilhelm Wehrenpfennig; Eduard Lasker; Heinrich von Treitschke; Johannes von Miquel; Franz von Roggenbach; Karl Braun; Rudolf Gneist; Ludwig Bamberger
- Founded: February 12, 1867; 159 years ago
- Dissolved: December 15, 1918; 107 years ago
- Split from: German Progress Party
- Succeeded by: German People's Party
- Ideology: National liberalism Free trade 1867–1879: Liberalism (German)
- Political position: Centre to centre-right 1867–1879: Centre to centre-left (Note: In the early years of the German Empire (1871–1879), the party sat on the left side ("Liberal Bloc") of the Reichstag alongside the Progress Party, representing the broader liberal movement. However, following the internal split of 1880 and the party's support for Bismarck's protectionist policies, its seating and political stance shifted significantly to the right.)
- Colours: Green

The National Liberal Party (German: Nationalliberale Partei, NLP) was a liberal party of the North German Confederation and the German Empire which flourished between 1867 and 1918.

During the Prussian-led unification of Germany, the National Liberals became the dominant party in the Reichstag. While supporting the common ideals of liberalism and nationalism, the party contained two wings, which reflected the conflicting claims of its Hegelian and idealistic heritage: one emphasized the power of the state through the Nationalstaat, and the other emphasized the civil liberties of the Rechtsstaat. Although that cleavage later proved fatal for its unity, the National Liberals managed to remain the pivotal party in the decades after unification by cooperating with both the Progressives and the Free Conservatives on various issues.

== Origins ==
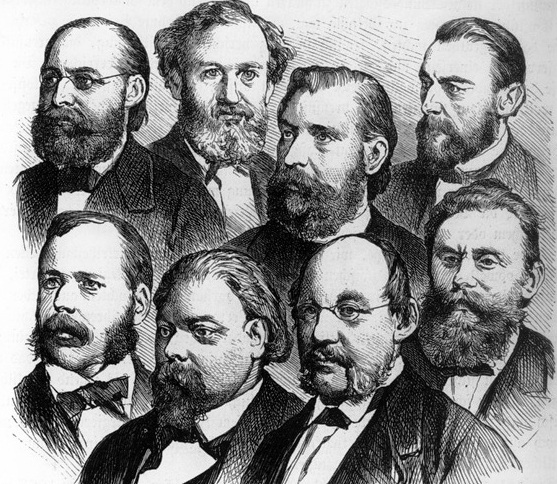
Leading politicians of the National Liberal Party from left to right: Wilhelm Wehrenpfennig, Eduard Lasker, Heinrich von Treitschke and Johannes von Miquel; bottom row from left to right: Franz von Roggenbach, Karl Braun, Rudolf Gneist and Ludwig Bamberger (woodcut c. 1878)

A first national liberal parliamentary group arose among right-wing deputies of the liberal German Progress Party in the Prussian House of Representatives during a constitutional conflict sparked by Minister President Otto von Bismarck: In 1862, he had overruled the Liberal opposition in parliament using the so-called Lückentheorie ("Gap Theory") to justify proceeding with taxes for military reforms of the Prussian Army, accompanied by his martial "Blood and Iron" speech. In the following years, he aimed to reconcile with his opponents by strengthening Prussian hegemony, which culminated in the Seven Weeks' War of 1866.

Upon the victory over the Austrian forces at the Battle of Königgrätz on 3 July, many of the liberals finally put aside their differences due to their support for Bismarck's highly successful foreign policy. Seizing the opportunity, he introduced a bill that subsequently formalized his circumvention of parliamentary budgetary rights.

At voting time on 3 September, the political division of the liberals was confirmed when 19 National Liberal deputies opted for his Indemnity Law. While the Liberals who opposed the bill argued that Bismarck was asking them to compromise on constitutional government, the bill’s supporters believed opposition was fruitless because Bismarck had the firm support of King Wilhelm I (under the constitution, the minister-president was responsible to the king, not parliament). They believed that if they accepted the Indemnity Law, they would be in a better position to press for greater freedom. This, the first National Liberal faction in the Prussian parliament was formed on 17 November around Eduard Lasker and Hans Victor von Unruh.

The National Liberal Party was founded in the course of the North German federal election held on 12 February 1867. They gathered support from the Prussian annexed territories of Hanover and Hesse-Nassau as well as from the other states of the Confederation, emerging as the largest faction in the North German Reichstag. An inaugural declaration was adopted on 12 June. The first party chairman was Rudolf von Bennigsen.

The party strongly advocated the interests of the Grand Burgher (German: Großbürger) dynasties and business magnates as well as nationalist-minded Protestant circles of the educated bourgeoisie (Bildungsbürgertum). The key points of the party manifesto focused on national unification and Bismarck's policies, which resulted in the emergence of a German nation state as a constitutional monarchy and highly industrialized country.

== Dominance in the 1870s ==
The National Liberals' period of great dominance was between 1871 and 1879, when they were Bismarck's chief allies in the Reichstag where they were avid supporters of the anti-Catholic Kulturkampf measures and the Anti-Socialist Laws. In the first all-German federal election held on 3 March 1871, the party reached 30.1% of the votes, becoming the strongest group in the Reichstag parliament with 119 seats. The Reichstag faction remained the political centre of power as the party never attained a large number of members. Chairman of National Liberal Party was Rudolf von Bennigsen.

The stabilization of the new state was in a large degree only feasible because of National Liberals' support as de facto ruling party and their guidance of Bismarck's domestic policies, especially in regards to national economics and the legal foundations of the German Empire. Weights and measurements were standardized, a common German market and a national bank, the Reichsbank, created and the numerous regional currencies replaced with the Goldmark. The liberal economic policies, although temporarily unpopular in the recession of the 1870s, laid the groundworks for the economic boom the German nation experienced at the turn of the 19th century.

== Decline ==
In 1879, Bismarck's alliance with the National Liberals broke over his abandonment of free trade by the adoption of a tariff. In the economic crisis following the Panic of 1873, several lobbying associations exerted pressure on Bismarck who increasingly favoured a more protectionist approach. However, these policies violated the liberal principles of both the National Liberals and the more left-leaning liberal German Progress Party. The shift was so important that it has been characterized as Bismarck's conservative turn. This meant an enduring shift of the Chancellor to the right, which changed the political climate of the fledgling nation and soured relations between Bismarck and a number of leading German liberals.

The National Liberals lost their status as the dominant party in 1880, when the left-wing represented by the Liberal Union split off and merged with the Progress Party into the German Free-minded Party by 1884. The remaining partisans approached to the Conservatives, later the strongest supporters of Alfred von Tirpitz's various Fleet Acts starting in 1898, which pushed Great Britain into an arms race with Germany until World War I. In the federal election of 1887, a right-wing cartel of National Liberals, Conservatives and Free Conservatives once again ensured a parliamentary majority for Bismarck until his resignation in 1890.

As for the Kulturkampf, Bismarck deserted the liberals, came to terms with a new less confrontational Pope and started working politically with the Catholic Centre Party. Historian Hajo Holborn examines the contradictions between the Kulturkampf and liberal values:

[O]nly those laws that separated state and church could be defended from a liberal point of view. Full state control over schools was a liberal ideal. It was also logical to introduce the obligatory civil marriage law and entrust civil agencies with the keeping of vital statistics. [...] But all the other measures constituted shocking violations of liberal principles. German liberalism showed no loyalty to the ideas of lawful procedure or of political and cultural freedom which had formerly been its lifeblood. With few exceptions the German liberals were hypnotized by the national state, which they wished to imbue with a uniform pattern of culture. They were unable to recognize that the Kulturkampf was bound to undermine the belief in the Rechtsstaat (government by law) and to divide the German people profoundly.

David Blackbourn says the liberal attacks on the Catholic Church "left a political legacy that was the opposite of what liberals wanted. It made them beholden to Bismarck; and helped consolidate political Catholicism in Germany".

== Allies of big business ==
In 1905, Ernst Bassermann became chairman of National Liberal Party. He followed chairman Johannes von Miquel. The National Liberals came to be closely associated with the interests of big business, maintaining strong relations with mighty industrialist advocacy groups as well as with imperialist and nationalist associations like the Pan-German League. Increasingly threatened by the growing strength of the Social Democrats, the party gradually became more conservative, although it was generally split between a more liberal wing that sought to strengthen ties with the dissident liberals to their left and a right-wing that came to support more protectionist policies and close relations with the Conservatives and the imperial government.

== World War I ==
During World War I, most of the National Liberals, including such leaders of their left wing as Gustav Stresemann, avidly supported the expansionist goals of the imperial government, although they also called for reform at home. Following the war, the party broke up. Stresemann led the main body of the party, including most of its moderate and conservative elements, into the conservative liberal German People's Party. Its left wing merged with the left-liberal Progressive People's Party to form the German Democratic Party. The far-right wing of the National Liberals joined the German National People's Party.

== Election results ==
Reichstag
| Date | Votes | | | Seats | | Position | Size |
| Date | No. | % | ± pp | No. | ± | Position | Size |
|---|---|---|---|---|---|---|---|
| February 1867 | 753,758 | 20.19 | New | 78 / 149 | New | | New |
| August 1867 | 414,043 | 18.02 | ▼2.17 | 80 / 149 | ▲2 | | 1st |
| 1868 Zollparlament | Unknown | Unknown | Unknown | 104 / 192 | ▲24 | | 1st |
| 1871 | 1,125,942 | 28.97 | Unknown | 117 / 382 | ▲13 | | 1st |
| 1874 | 1,394,250 | 26.86 | ▼2.11 | 147 / 397 | ▲30 | | 1st |
| 1877 | 1,440,266 | 26.67 | ▼0.19 | 127 / 397 | ▼20 | Support | 1st |
| 1878 | 1,291,161 | 22.41 | ▼4.26 | 97 / 397 | ▼30 | Opposition | 1st |
| 1881 | 617,752 | 12.12 | ▼10.29 | 45 / 397 | ▼52 | Support | ▼5th |
| 1884 | 987,355 | 17.44 | ▲5.32 | 50 / 397 | ▲5 | Opposition | ▲4th |
| 1887 | 1,651,288 | 21.90 | ▲4.46 | 98 / 397 | ▲48 | Opposition | ▲1st |
| 1890 | 1,130,842 | 15.64 | ▼6.26 | 38 / 397 | ▼60 | Opposition | ▼4th |
| 1893 | 943,410 | 12.29 | ▼3.35 | 51 / 397 | ▲13 | Opposition | ▲3rd |
| 1898 | 997,147 | 12.86 | ▲0.57 | 48 / 397 | ▼3 | Opposition | ▼4th |
| 1903 | 1,301,473 | 13.71 | ▲0.85 | 50 / 397 | ▲2 | Opposition | 4th |
| 1907 | 1,666,705 | 14.80 | ▲1.09 | 56 / 397 | ▲6 | Opposition | ▲3rd |
| 1912 | 1,651,115 | 13.53 | ▼1.27 | 45 / 397 | ▼11 | Opposition | 3rd |

== Chairmen ==
- Rudolf von Bennigsen (1867-1883)
- Johannes von Miquel (1883-1901)
- Ernst Bassermann (1905-1912)

== See also ==
- Contributions to liberal theory
- Liberal democracy
- Liberalism
- Liberalism in Germany
- Liberalism worldwide
- List of liberal parties

== Notes ==
| Preceded by German Progress Party | National Liberal Party; 1867–1918 | Succeeded by German People's Party |
| Preceded by German National Association | National Liberal Party; 1867–1918 | Succeeded by German People's Party |
