= Radical =

Radical (from Latin: radix, root) may refer to:

== Politics and ideology ==
=== Politics ===
- Classical radicalism, the ideology and movement started in late 18th century Britain and spread to continental Europe and Latin America in the 19th century
- Radical politics, the political intent of fundamental societal change
- Radical Party (disambiguation), several political parties
- Radicals (UK), a British and Irish grouping in the early to mid-19th century
- Radicalization
- Politicians from the Radical Civic Union

=== Ideologies ===
- Radical chic, a term coined by Tom Wolfe to describe the pretentious adoption of radical causes
- Radical feminism, a perspective within feminism that focuses on patriarchy
- Radical Islam, or Islamic extremism
- Radical Christianity
- Radical veganism, a radical interpretation of veganism, usually combined with anarchism
- Radical Reformation, an Anabaptist movement concurrent with the Protestant Reformation

== Science and mathematics ==
=== Science ===
- Radical (chemistry), an atom, molecule, or ion with unpaired valence electron(s)
- Radical surgery, where diseased tissue or lymph nodes are removed from a diseased organ

=== Mathematics ===
- Radical expression involving roots, also known as an nth root
  - Solution in radicals
- Radical symbol (√), used to indicate the square root and other roots
- Radical of an algebraic group, a concept in algebraic group theory
- Radical of an ideal, an important concept in abstract algebra
- Radical of a ring, an ideal of "bad" elements of a ring
  - Jacobson radical, consisting of those elements in a ring R that annihilate all simple right R-modules
  - Nilradical of a ring, a nilpotent ideal which is as large as possible
- Radical of a module, a component in the theory of structure and classification
- Radical of an integer, in number theory, the product of the primes which divide an integer
- Radical of a Lie algebra, a concept in Lie theory
  - Nilradical of a Lie algebra, a nilpotent ideal which is as large as possible
- Left (or right) radical of a bilinear form, the subspace of all vectors left (or right) orthogonal to every vector

== Linguistics ==
- Root (linguistics), in morphology
  - Radical, a Semitic root consonant
- Radical (Chinese characters), a glyph component
- Radical consonant, in phonology

== Arts and entertainment ==
=== Music ===
- Radical (mixtape), by Odd Future, 2010
- Radical (Every Time I Die album), 2021
- Radical (Smack album), 1988
- "Radicals" (song), a song by Tyler, The Creator from the 2011 album Goblin
- "Radical", an instrumental by Dyro and Dannic, 2014

=== Architecture and design ===
- Radical period (design), a period in late 1960s Italian design
- Radical Baroque, an architectural style

=== Literature ===
- Radical: Taking Back Your Faith from the American Dream, a 2010 book by Christian pastor David Platt
- Radical: My Journey out of Islamist Extremism, a 2012 memoir by British activist Maajid Nawaz

=== Film ===
- Radical (film), a 2023 Spanish language film

== Other uses ==
- Murphy Radical, a Canadian light aircraft design
- Radical, Missouri, U.S., a ghost town
- Radical Sportscars, a British sports car maker
- Radical Entertainment, a Canadian video game developer
- Radical.fm, a digital music streaming service
- Radical Software, American art journal started in 1970

== See also ==
- The Radicalz, a World Wrestling Federation stable
- Radical center (disambiguation)
- Radical left (disambiguation)
- Radical right (disambiguation)
- Radikal (disambiguation)
- Radicle, the first part of a seedling
