= Far-left politics =

Political alignment in the left-wing spectrum

Far-left politics (Note: Also known as extreme left politics or left-wing extremism) are politics further to the left on the political spectrum than the standard political left. The far-left encompasses a wide range of heterogeneous ideologies: broadly anarchism and socialism, including revolutionary socialism, Marxism, communism, and related ideologies. The far-left frequently advocates for anti-capitalism, anti-globalisation, anti-imperialism, often environmentalism, and anti-fascism, with most of the far-left aspiring to a classless and/or stateless society.

The far-left is distinguished from social democracy — also members of the political left slightly to the "right" of the far-left on the left–right political spectrum — through its opposition to capitalism, globalisation, and incrementalism. Some researchers define the far-left as being a broad coalition of all ideologies to the left of social democracy, while others use a more limited definition focusing on left-wing advocates for revolution.

The far-left's relationship with anti-authoritarianism is complicated, with anarchists and democratic socialists strongly opposing authoritarianism, while Marxists advocate for a temporary dictatorship of the proletariat until society fully transitions to communism, which mainstream Western scholarship and historians generally characterize as resulting in authoritarian governing structures. Members of the far-left have historically been subjects of political repression by fascist and authoritarian capitalist regimes.

The extent to which the left should embrace reformism (peaceful change within a system) is a source of serious contention within the far-left. An example is Rosa Luxemburg's 1899 essay Social Reform or Revolution?, where she censured social democrats in Germany's SPD for embracing reformism. However, the far-left has often achieved electoral success by forming coalitions with social democrats. Democratic socialists are generally more amiable to reformism than others in the far-left, such as anarchists and Marxists who are generally more hostile to reformism. Anti-reformists (on the far-left) often argue reform co-ops far-left movements or forces them to compromise their beliefs. Reformists have used democratic methods to pursue their goals, and this has become more prominent in industrialized nations following the Great Recession. Revolutionary far-left movements often advocate to realise their ideals through political violence, and consequently some resort to far-left terrorism or revolution to achieve their goals, while many in developing nations have formed armed insurgencies. In the mid-to-late 20th century, many anti-reformists began using less violent forms of militant advocacy, such as by engaging in black bloc tactics and civil unrest.

== Ideologies ==
Far-left politics are the leftmost ideologies on the left of the left–right political spectrum. They are a heterogeneous group of ideologies within left-wing politics, and wide variety exists between different far-left groups. Ideologies such as communism and anarchism are typically described as far-left. Far-left politics is typically regarded as being to the left of social democracy. As with all political alignments, the exact boundaries of centre-left versus far-left within left-wing politics are not clearly defined and can vary depending on context. Far-left parties sometimes avoid anti-capitalist rhetoric to appeal to the centre-left, while the centre-left may invoke language of radicalism or incorporate some of its ideas. The modern far-left distinguishes itself from social democracy through its inherent opposition to capitalism, neoliberalism, and globalisation. Adherents to the far-left may be drawn to it by a desire to correct injustice and unfairness, often when it is directed toward oppressed demographics. Some who engage in far-left politics are interested in a single issue like environmentalism and do not subscribe to a broader far-left ideology.

Academic study of far-left politics often uses radical left as an all-encompassing term, though some far-left groups object to this usage as derogatory. Extreme left and anti-capitalist left are also commonly used as synonyms for the far-left. The radical left and the extreme left are often used as equivalents, though some writers create distinctions between them. Hard left may also be used. Far-left political parties use a variety of descriptors for themselves, including workers', labour, socialist, communist, militant, and revolutionary parties. According to Sebastian Jungkunz, far-left ideologies are typically derived from either anarchism or Marxism. According to Uwe Backes, there are many hybrid forms of anarchism and communism. These ideologies are considered radical due to their divergence from capitalism, the dominant ideology of modern society. They do not have a radical element in communist states despite being far-left in a global context.

A unified working class has traditionally been the focus of far-left movements. Karl Marx defined the working class in the 19th century to include all waged employees of all industries. The development of middle management and decline of the petite bourgeoisie complicated the definition over time. The modern European far-left overall has higher educational attainment than its far-right equivalent. Students and intellectuals have often been inclined to support far-left politics. The far-left may appeal to independent producers or craftsmen who fear competition for large corporations. The unemployed, including the elderly and disabled, are associated with the working class as defined by the far-left because of the disadvantages they may face. The majority of left-leaning labourers preferred social democracy over far-left ideologies.

=== Communism and Marxism ===
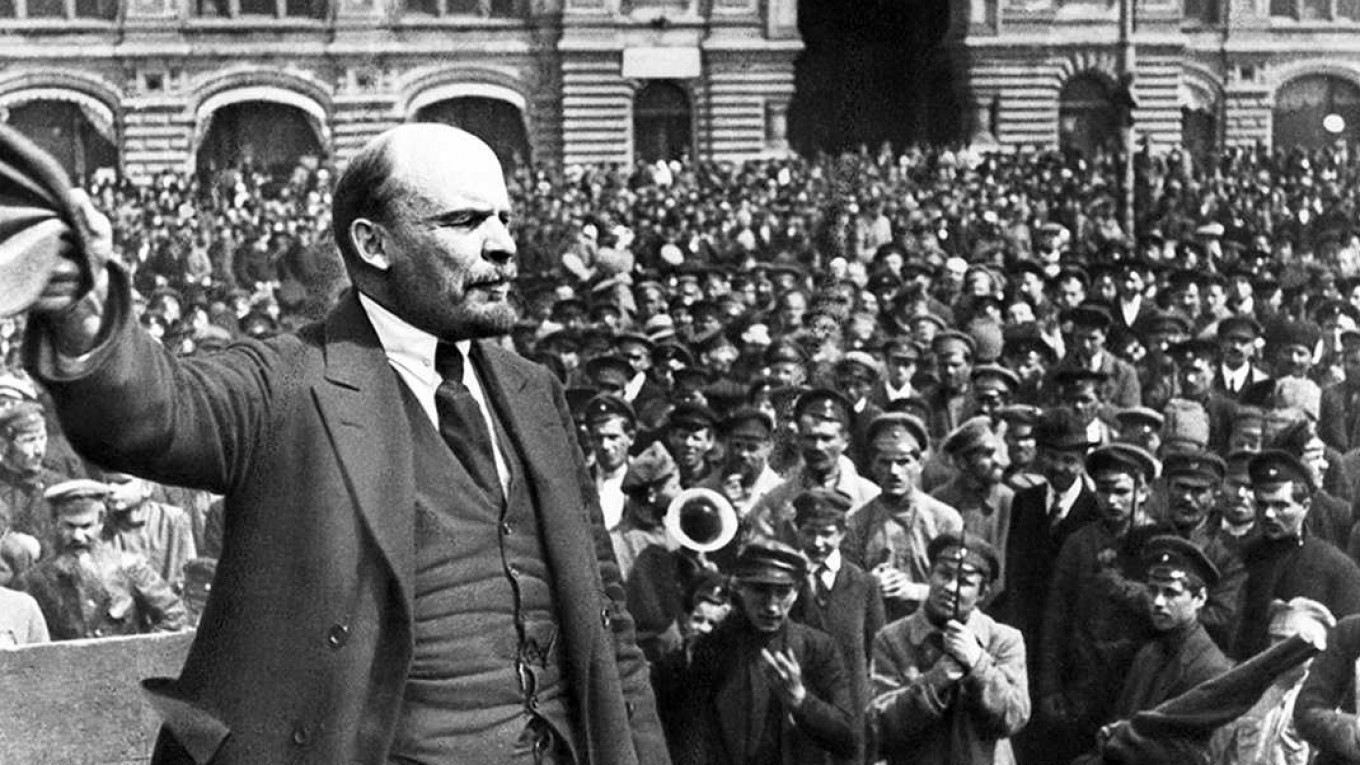
Vladimir Lenin giving a speech

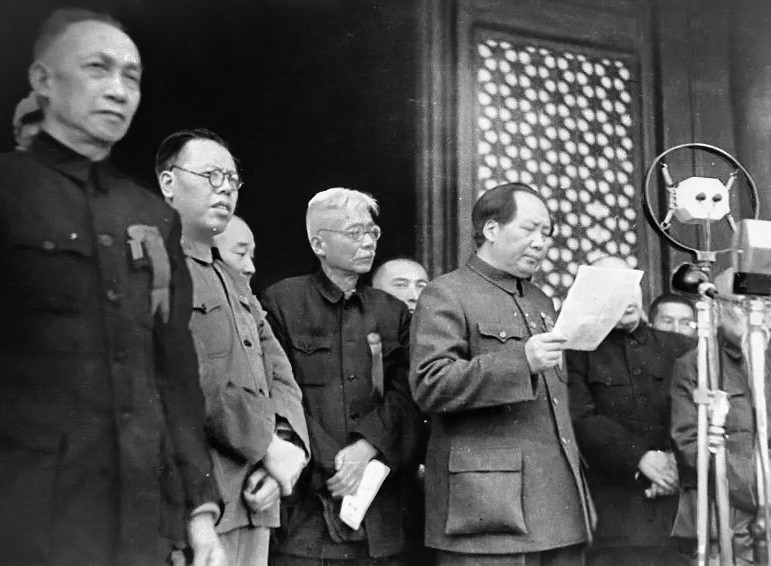
Chairman Mao Zedong and leading revolutionaries proclaim the People's Republic of China on 1 October 1949, is an iconic day of the Chinese Communist Revolution.

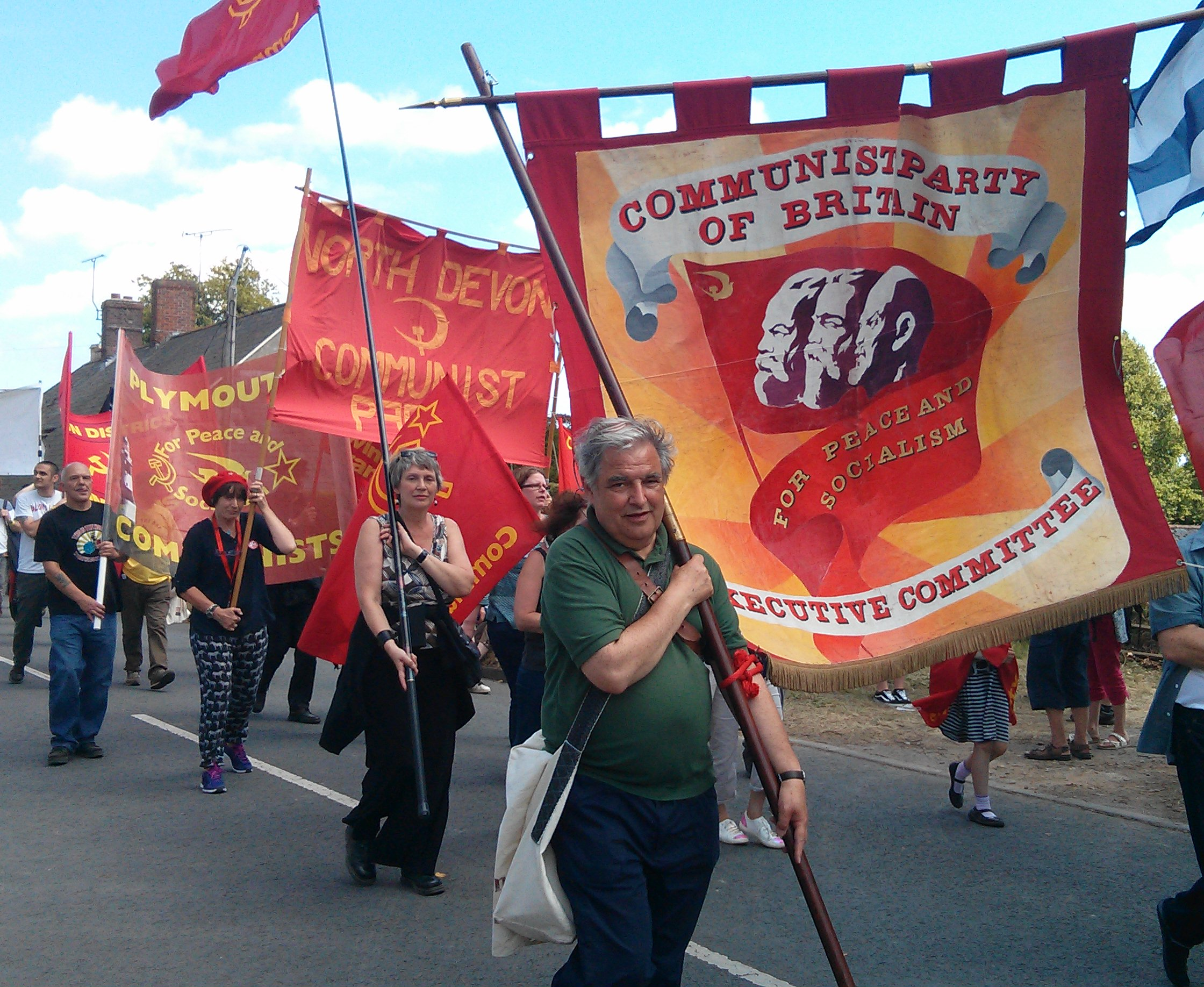
Members of the far-left Communist Party of Britain at the Tolpuddle Martyrs' Festival

Communism is the belief that humanity should abandon class divisions in favour of a communist society organised around the needs and abilities of its citizens. Modern communism is a form of revolutionary socialism based on support for the communist society described in the writing of Karl Marx and Friedrich Engels, known as Marxism. Since its introduction, elements of Marxism have become a common factor between most far-left groups. Communist ideology appears in a variety of forms, especially since the dissolution of the Soviet Union left communists without a unifying force.

Marxism sees the proletariat as the primary movers of the revolution. Marx and Engels observed that the working class of 19th century Europe had little influence on or attachment to their nations, and they espoused socialist internationalism that framed class struggle as an issue that united workers without regard to national affiliation. They considered socialist movements within a nation to be necessary only as a means to challenge that nation's bourgeoisie. Marx and Engels believed that the most developed nations were the most likely to see a communist revolution.

Leninists, followers of Russian Marxist Vladimir Lenin, believe that capitalism should be replaced by a dictatorship of the proletariat, which would cause capitalism to degrade and quickly disappear. Leninist-led revolutions have imposed authoritarian rule over society despite invoking concepts of equality when seeking power. The Bolshevik revolution created soviet councils that were to serve as a democratic method of achieving the dictatorship of the proletariat. With the failure of revolutions in Western Europe, Leninism moved away from the belief that revolutions would occur in more developed nations through popular unrest. According to Luke March, the ideology was unsuccessful in more developed nations, as the middle and upper classes were more established, and the unionist working class outnumbered any revolutionary peasantry.

Marxism–Leninism has historically been a major far-left ideology, especially before the dissolution of the Soviet Union. Stalinism supports a one-party state with a planned economy. Stalin abandoned socialist internationalism and established his policy of socialism in one country, where the Communist Party of the Soviet Union prioritised its own stability. It abandoned efforts to spread communism to Western Europe, and it exercised control over the Communist parties of neighbouring countries to reinforce its own strength.

Trotskyism emerged as a dissident current within the Communist movement after Stalin's rise. It criticised Stalin's belief in socialism in one country and the totalitarian system of rule he established, arguing that the Soviet Union had become a degenerated workers state and later that its satellites were deformed workers states. Trotskyism's main organisation was the Fourth International, although this has seen multiple splits and regroupings.

Conservative groups within Marxism–Leninism, such as the Communist Party of Greece and the Portuguese Communist Party, support revitalisation of Soviet-style government and adhere to a classical Leninist interpretation of communism. Reform communists such as the Cypriot Progressive Party of Working People retain Soviet-style organisation but adopt public involvement in government, the use of a market system, and acceptance of New Left policies. Maoism developed as an alternative form of Marxist–Leninist-style vanguardism that emphasised anti-imperialism. Maoism sees the peasantry as the primary movers of the revolution. This spawned Guevarism, an ideology advocated by Che Guevara and Régis Debray which holds that foco guerrilla warfare can serve the role of a vanguard instead of a formal vanguard party.

Other Marxist ideologies developed in Western Europe. Eurocommunism supports a reformist, democratic approach to achieving communism and opposes the ideology of the Soviet Union. Autonomism rejects organised movements and promotes direct personal action. While originating from communist thought, it became more anarchist as it developed. Left communism or ultra-leftism is a Marxist challenge to Marxism–Leninism. The ultra-left believes communism should be allowed to rise naturally when the people of a given area are inspired to revolt, instead of through a planned revolution.

Latin American liberation theology blends Catholicism and Marxism.

=== Anarchism ===
Anarchism is a far-left ideology that rejects all forms of authority, social hierarchy, or socially imposed control over the people. This manifests as a total rejection of the state in any form. Some describe it as a revolutionary ideology that seeks to overthrow capitalism at once instead of dismantling it over time. Some anarchists like Mikhail Bakunin and Peter Kropotkin advocate a society based on social relations and interdependence. Individualist anarchism, influenced by Max Stirner and Pierre-Joseph Proudhon, emphasizes the individual and their will over external determinants such as groups, society, traditions, and ideological systems. Green anarchism is an ideology within anarchism, and some of its contemporary adherents argue that climate change will become apocalyptic. Anarcho-primitivism holds that civilisation is responsible for environmental damage and must be dismantled. Insurrectionary anarchism involves the use of individual cells or affinity groups to carry out guerrilla attacks against people and places associated with political or economic power. Opponents of civilisation may support accelerationism, which endorses acts that will increase chaos and instability within society to bring about its downfall more quickly.

At the end of the nineteenth century, a minority of anarchists adopted tactics of revolutionary political violence, known as propaganda of the deed. The belief was that acts of violence would make the public more aware of grievances against the established political system, demonstrate that the state is vulnerable, provoke the state into responding to expose hypocrisy, and encourage others to carry out their own acts of violence. Even though many anarchists distanced themselves from these terrorist acts, infamy came upon the movement and attempts were made to prevent anarchists immigrating to the US, including the Immigration Act of 1903, also called the Anarchist Exclusion Act. By the turn of the 20th century, the terrorist movement had died down, giving way to anarchist communism and syndicalism, while anarchism had spread all over the world.

=== New Left ===
The far-left is sometimes divided into the Old Left and the New Left. The New Left was a broad political movement that emerged from the counterculture of the 1960s and continued through the 1970s. It consisted of activists in the Western world who, in reaction to the era's liberal establishment, campaigned for freer lifestyles on a broad range of social issues such as feminism, gay rights, drug policy reforms, and gender relations. The New Left differs from the traditional left in that it tended to acknowledge the struggle for various forms of social justice, whereas previous movements prioritized explicitly economic goals. However, many have used the term "New Left" to describe an evolution, continuation, and revitalization of traditional leftist goals.

Some who self-identified as "New Left" rejected involvement with the labour movement and Marxism's historical theory of class struggle; however, others gravitated to their own takes on established forms of Marxism, such as the New Communist movement (which drew from Maoism) in the United States or the K-Gruppen (Note: The K-Gruppen originally referred to the mainly Maoist-oriented small parties and other associations that had emerged in the 1960s with the disintegration of the Socialist German Student Union (SDS) and the associated decline of the West German student movement. The term "K group" has been used primarily by competing left groups as well as in the media. It served as a collective name for the numerous, often violently divided groups and alluded to their common self-image as communist cadre organizations. The German term Kader denotes the civil servants or party functionaries in autocratic state systems, especially in socialist states (today, among others, the People's Republic of China and Cuba). In the Soviet sphere of influence, cadres were a group of people in the party and ideology sector with political and technical knowledge and skills ("party cadres", "leadership cadres", "leadership cadres", "junior cadres", "cadre policy", "cadre management"). In particular, they included the functionaries of the parties and mass organizations (executives), and university and technical college graduates (experts), but not normal working people. The personnel department of a company was called "Kaderabteilung" in the GDR; the head of this department was called "Kaderleiter".) in the German-speaking world. In the United States, the movement was associated with the anti-war college-campus protest movements, including the Free Speech Movement.

The movement fell into decline following the end of the Vietnam War, in part as the result of a covert U.S. government campaign to mobilize the CIA's CHAOS and FBI's COINTELPRO to exacerbate existing fissions within the movement's most prominent groups, such as Students for a Democratic Society and the Black Panther Party. European Green parties formed from the New Left in the 1960s and 1970s, but these are not traditionally considered far-left.

== Positions ==
=== Economics and class ===
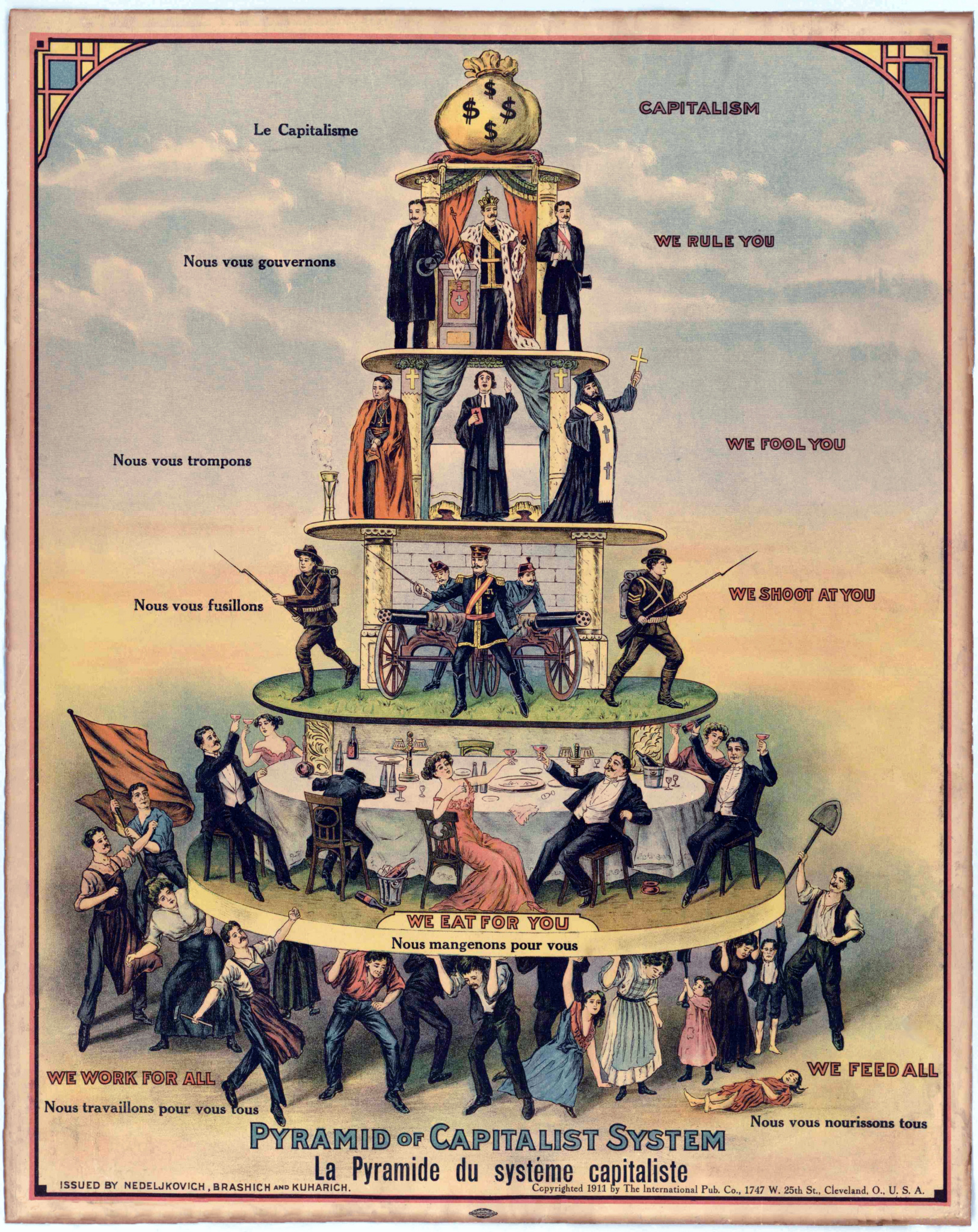
"Pyramid of Capitalist System", a cartoon displaying a diagram of class hierarchy, published by the Industrial Workers of the World in 1911

The goal of far-left politics is to create a classless society. It seeks a post-capitalist world without exploitation, oppression, or class inequality. This is often described as communist society, though terms such as socialism or democratisation may be used to describe a similar concept.

Under a communist society as envisioned by the far left, all means of production would be owned collectively and resources would be subject to distribution according to need. The specific nature of this society is not strictly defined, but it is generally agreed among the far-left that it would be self-governing and extend globally. The method to bring about communist society became the primary distinction among far-left ideologies as they developed, and ideas of how communist society should function changed over time. While the far-left historically opposed social democracy over its reformist nature, the post-Soviet far-left accuses social democracy of being too comfortable with neoliberalism.

Far-left groups support redistribution of income and wealth and advocate equality of outcome over equal opportunity. Equal rights are typically given higher priority than individual rights. It argues that capitalism and consumerism cause social inequality and advocate their dissolution. Some far-left groups also support the abolition of private property. Far-left movements became increasingly pro-environmentalist beginning in the 1960s. The far-left rejects neoliberalism, but it also rejects centre-left ideas like social democracy and Keynesian economics. It supports social advances within capitalism, but only as temporary measures until capitalism's abolition. It expresses support for groups that are otherwise excluded from economic prosperity.

As an extension of left-wing politics, the far-left maintains that inequality is a fixable problem. European populist left politics share many of the values of centre-left politics, including cosmopolitanism, altruism, and egalitarianism. By the 21st century, the European far-left expressed interest in many political issues traditionally associated with progressivism, including cost of living, housing shortages, and identity politics.

=== Social and environmental issues ===
Communism has historically emphasised economics and class over social issues. In the 1970s and 1980s, far-left movements in Western Europe were increasingly defined by the new social movements, which gave prominence to issues such as environmentalism, animal rights, women's rights, the peace movement. These ideas as a singular movement became less prominent in far-left politics as they were subsumed by green politics, but they are still disparately supported by many in the far-left. The American far-left advocates social equity, and it cites white privilege and male privilege as the causes of inequity.

Far-left parties hold a variety of positions on environmentalism. Far-left environmentalist movements may support their causes for the sake of all living things, or out of interest in social justice for those affected by environmental damage. Those who support radical environmentalism might also support typical pro-environmental positions but demand that they be done rapidly instead of gradually. Modern radical environmentalists maintain belief in the idea of climate apocalypse, which has been adopted by moderates in some nations as well. The far-left opposed nuclear power in the 1980s on environmental grounds. The anti-globalisation movement adopted environmentalism as one of its main causes as it developed in the 1990s and 2000s.

=== Government and revolution ===
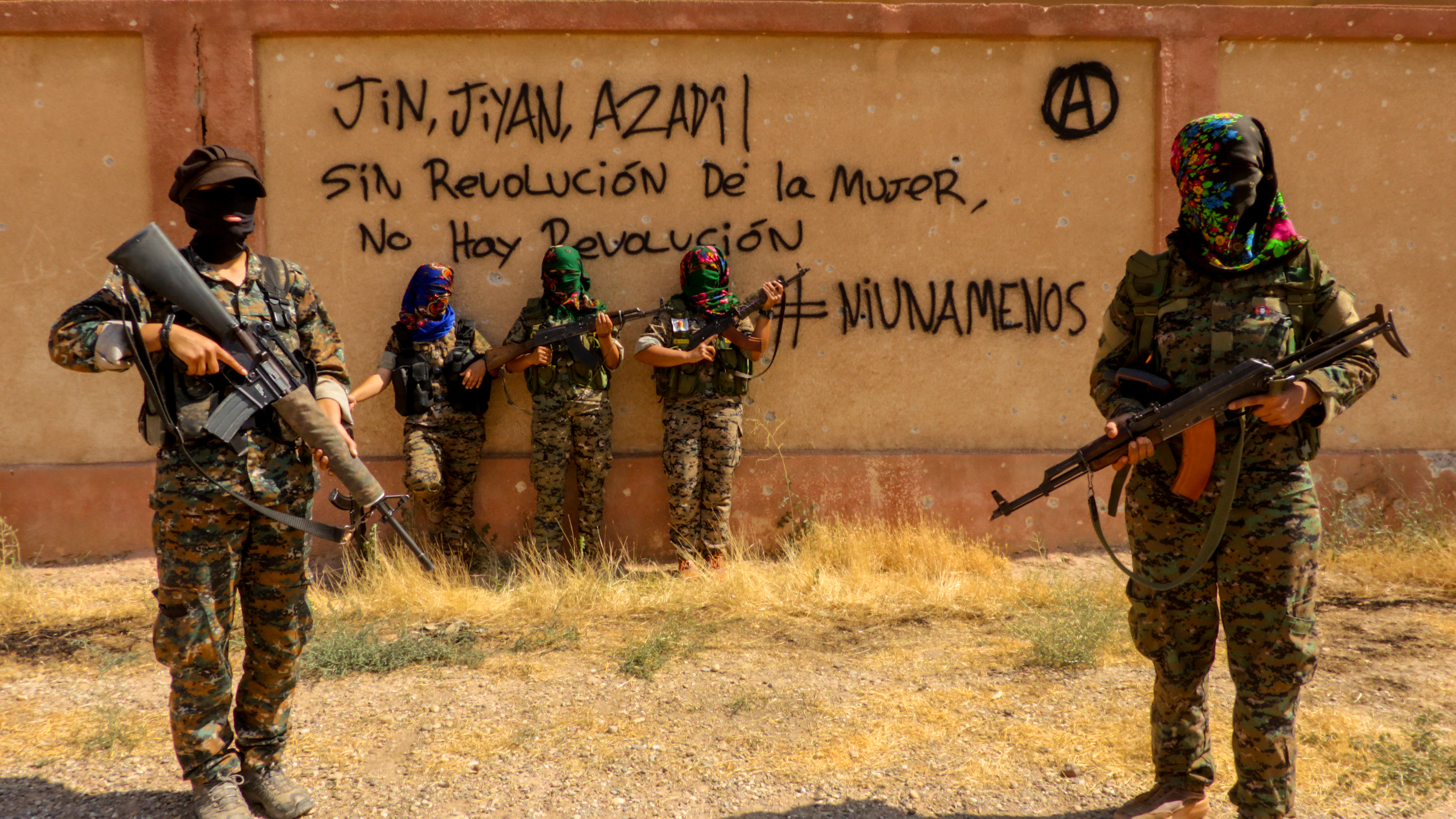
Internationals in the IRPGF battalion with text in Spanish reading "Without a revolution for women, there is no revolution".

The far-left is a form of radical politics, as it calls for fundamental change to the capitalist socio-economic structure of society. This distinguishes it from the reformist politics of the centre-left. Members of the far-left have varying opinions on revolution and the state. The far-left has different stances on democracy, but it opposes liberal democracy. Far-left groups sometimes support direct democracy or participatory democracy with emphasis on protecting the rights of those who are disenfranchised in liberal democracy. The revolutionary left supports total rebellion against capitalist governments. This form of far-left politics has become less common over time as revolutions failed to develop and far-left groups have become more willing to work within liberal capitalist nations. Deradicalisation has become more common within the broader political left.

Uwe Backes and Eckhard Jesse argue that, as a radical ideological system, the far-left opposes political pluralism. Academics such as Hans Eysenck and Edward Shils suggest that extremism is a better means to define ideology than the left–right spectrum, and that far-left ideas like Bolshevism are related to far-right ideas like Nazism because of their common opposition to political pluralism, liberal democracy, and private enterprise. Opponents of this view argue that extreme ideologies are separated by social class or that the far-left supports non-democratic means only to a democratic end. Some supporters of left-wing politics define support for democracy as equivalent to being left-wing, rejecting extremist label and arguing that communist states are actually far-right entities. In developed nations where the proletariat has influence over society, communist groups opt for institutional compromise over revolution.

Some far-left groups, such as Leninist parties, advocate the concept of vanguardism, in which a select group forms a vanguard party to function as a revolution's leadership. According to Philip W. Gray, this holds that history is guided by advances in technology and ownership of the means of production, that oppression permeates all aspects of society, that there will be an end of history where oppression no longer exists, and that there is a class enforcing this oppression that must be overcome because it cannot understand or accept the end of history. It emphasises that this system of oppression and revolution is something that could be studied scientifically, and the vanguard party asserts that it is able to understand this science. Gray says that vanguardism incorporates democratic centralism, where the party membership makes a decision together and then enforces it on all of its members. Gray says it presents the vanguard party's ideas as inevitable and allows contrary ideas to be dismissed as false consciousness that was imposed by oppressors.

=== Geopolitics and global affairs ===
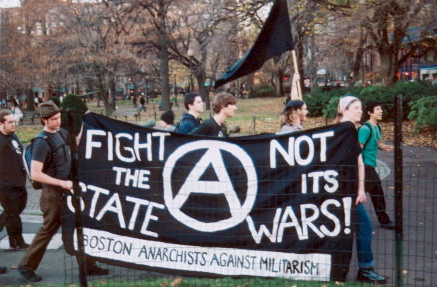
Anarchist protesters in Boston opposing state-waged war

As part of the left-wing, far-left politics is associated with internationalism and it rejects loyalty to the working class of one nation at the expense of others. During the Cold War, supporters of Stalinism often applied internationalism to mean loyalty to the Soviet Union, while the post-Soviet far-left is especially associated with the anti-globalisation movement. The anti-globalist far-left supports regulation of international free trade, the restructuring or dissolution of international political organisations, increased environmental regulations, the abolition of debt owed by developing nations. Political philosophers like Michael Hardt, Antonio Negri, and John Holloway have advocated a leaderless separation from international power structures through refusal to participate in modern systems.

The far-left typically opposes major geopolitical institutions such as NATO and the International Monetary Fund. The European far-left is typically Eurosceptic and opposes the European Union, either challenging its liberal orientation or rejecting the idea of a union entirely from the perspective of left-wing nationalism. Many support entry into the European Union but wish to reorganise or repurpose it.

The far-left is typically anti-imperialist, although during the Cold War supporters of the Eastern and Western blocs were often more accepting of their own side's actions. Although Third camp socialists opposed both blocs, many on the far left specifically oppose imperialist actions and military activity by the Western world and especially from the United States. The far-left may support militancy while also opposing militarist ideas. During the Cold War, far-left groups associated with new social movements advocated for the interests of the Third World. Far-left movements in Europe generally support Kurdish nationalism and provide assistance to militant Kurdish groups.

== Electoral dynamics ==
Far-left parties have historically been unable to win control of the government in parliamentary systems unless they join coalitions with social democratic governments. Whether to work with other parties in an electoral system is a common issue faced by far-left parties. They are commonly unsuccessful in enacting policy in times where they do lead the government. The far-left does not benefit from an incumbency advantage as much as other ideological groups and is more likely to fail in reelection efforts. As with far-right parties, far-left parties are typically forced to moderate in democratic systems to gain support among voters, leading to factionalism as they disagree on how much to moderate. Far-left parties may be challenged by right-wing parties with welfare chauvinism, which supports a welfare state but restricts it from those seen as foreigners.

The far-left gain more support in nations with long-term social inequality, and when there are poor economic conditions. Far-left voters are more likely to be working class, trade union members, and irreligious. Older, working class, male, and less educated voters are more likely to support communism over democratic socialism. The far-left primarily competes with social democratic parties for votes in electoral systems. Green parties sometimes provide electoral competition for the far-left, as both groups appeal to similar demographics. They vary in how willing they are to work alongside centre-left parties in electoral politics, which is a major point of dispute within many far-left groups. Alignment with centre-left parties sometimes causes far-left parties to moderate their positions. Strengthening of the far-left in a democratic system is associated with the weakening of democracy as it rejects political pluralism.

Far-left politics often has a sizeable non-electoral aspect, made up of trade unions and social movements. The far-left has historically supported direct activism over electoral gains, seeing it as a better position to improve workers' rights and build support for communist society. Movements in democratic nations may disagree over whether to participate in electoral politics, with some adhering to the Leninist belief that bourgeois governments should be overthrown. Ideologies such as anarchism, left-communism, and some New Left positions reject electoral participation entirely. When European far-left parties have gained power, they generally moved away from non-electoral activism and used their influence to limit its reach. Among the Western European far-left, support for electoral participation increased throughout the 20th century as revolution appeared unfeasible. Far-left parties in Europe are often affiliated with the Party of the European Left. The far-left is historically minuscule in Southeast Asia where it has been repressed or failed to develop.

Communist parties were the most common far-left parties between the 1920s and the 1960s, and in many cases, they were the only ones. Many other far-left parties emerged in the 1960s, including socialist and left-wing nationalist parties. As industrial workers became less common by the 21st century, far-left parties seeking power have been forced to either define the working class more loosely or to form alliances with other classes and ideological groups.

State repression can have unpredictable effects on far-left groups: Japan eliminated the domestic anarchist movement in the early-20th century, while Greece and the Czech Republic inadvertently strengthened theirs through attempts to repress them.

== History ==
=== Early history ===
Societies resembling communist society have been postulated throughout human history, and many have been proposed as the earliest socialist or communist ideas. The ideas of Plato have been described as an early type of socialism. In medieval Europe, some philosophers argued that Jesus believed in shared ownership of property and that the hierarchy of the Catholic Church was contrary to his teachings. This included the Taborites, who attempted to create a social structure that resembled a communist society. Numerous emancipation movements have occurred throughout history, including slave rebellions and peasant revolts.

Early examples of communist societies in fiction include Utopia by Thomas More, which proposed a society without personal property, and The City of the Sun by Tommaso Campanella, which proposed a society without the family unit.

Far-left politics comes from the left wing of the left–right political spectrum, which developed during the French Revolution. Classical/historical far-left politics encompasses a range of classical radical ideologies that advocate for political change. While the modern far-left tends to be socialist, the classical far-left is ultra-radical, such as Hébertists during the French Revolution and Estrema Radicale in the Kingdom of Italy. Historical far-left ideologies included republicanism; while not necessarily limited to radical left-wing politics today, it was classified as "far-left" during the period when monarchy was the global norm. At that time, the centre-left typically supported constitutional monarchy, leaving those advocating for a republic at the extreme end of the political spectrum.

Modern far-left politics developed from support for socialism. This can be traced to Europe and North America in the late 18th century, when industrialisation and political upheaval caused discontent among the working class. Socialists were those who objected to the changing social and economic structures associated with industrialisation, in that they promoted individualism over collectivism and that they created wealth for some but not for others, creating economic inequality.

=== 19th century ===
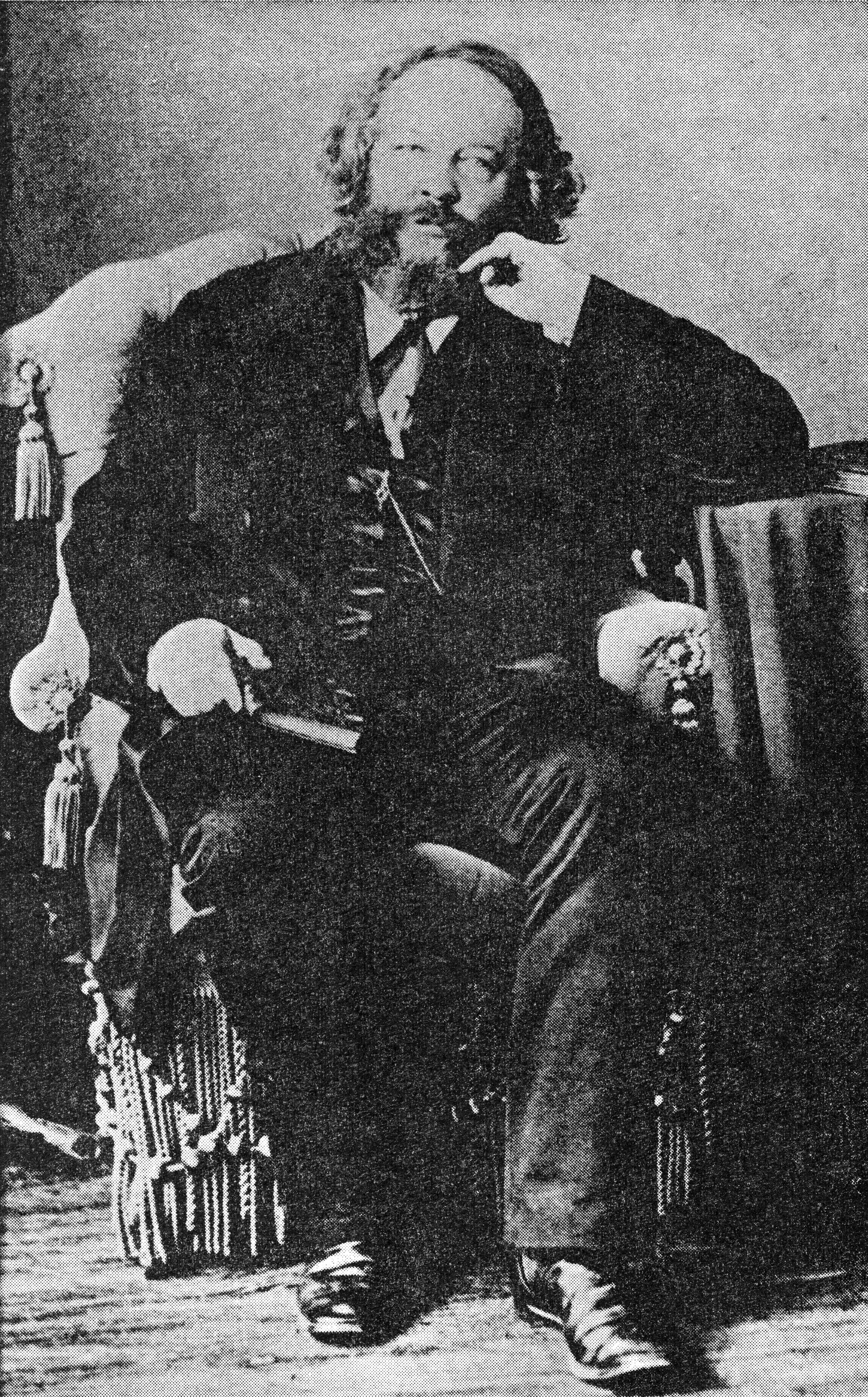
Mikhail Bakunin in 1863

Early European socialism was developed in the 19th century as the concept of a working class formed. It was influenced by numerous philosophers, such as Mikhail Bakunin, Louis Blanc, Louis Auguste Blanqui, Henri de Saint-Simon, Friedrich Engels, Charles Fourier, Ferdinand Lassalle, Karl Marx, Robert Owen, and Pierre-Joseph Proudhon. The modern far left developed during the Industrial Revolution as their ideas were adopted as a response to capitalism and industrialisation. Marxism and anarchism joined reformist socialism as the predominant left-wing ideologies. There were relatively few waged workers in the 19th century, which was still dominated by subsistence agriculture and independent sale of basic goods and services. The early far left was primarily made up of industrial workers. Labour groups led the Revolutions of 1848. The Luddites were anti-technology activists who emerged during the British Industrial Revolution, where they sabotaged machinery out of fear that it would displace workers.

The term socialism first came into use in the early 19th century to describe the egalitarian ideas of redistribution promoted by writers like François-Noël Babeuf and John Thelwall. Inspired by the French Revolution, these writers objected to the existence of significant wealth, and Babeuf advocated a dictatorship on behalf of the people that would destroy those who caused inequality. Socialism was recognised as a coherent philosophy in the 1830s with the publications of British reformer Robert Owen, who self-identified as socialist. Owen, as well as others such as Henri de Saint-Simon, Charles Fourier, and Étienne Cabet, developed the utopian socialist movement, and these utopian socialists established several communes to implement their ideology. Cabet responded to More's Utopia with his own novel, The Voyage to Icaria. He is credited with first using the term communism, though his usage was unrelated to the ideologies that were later known as communism.

Early anarchists emerged in the 19th century, including Pierre-Joseph Proudhon and Mikhail Bakunin. These anarchists endorsed many utopian ideas, but they emphasised the importance of revolution against and complete abolition of the state for a utopian society to exist. Mikhail Bakunin developed early anarchism by creating the Anti-authoritarian International in 1872 after he challenged Marxism during the Hague Congress. He argued that peasants rather than the working class should lead a socialist revolution, and he popularised calls to violence among the anarchist movement. Anarchist ideology spread to the Americas shortly after its development.

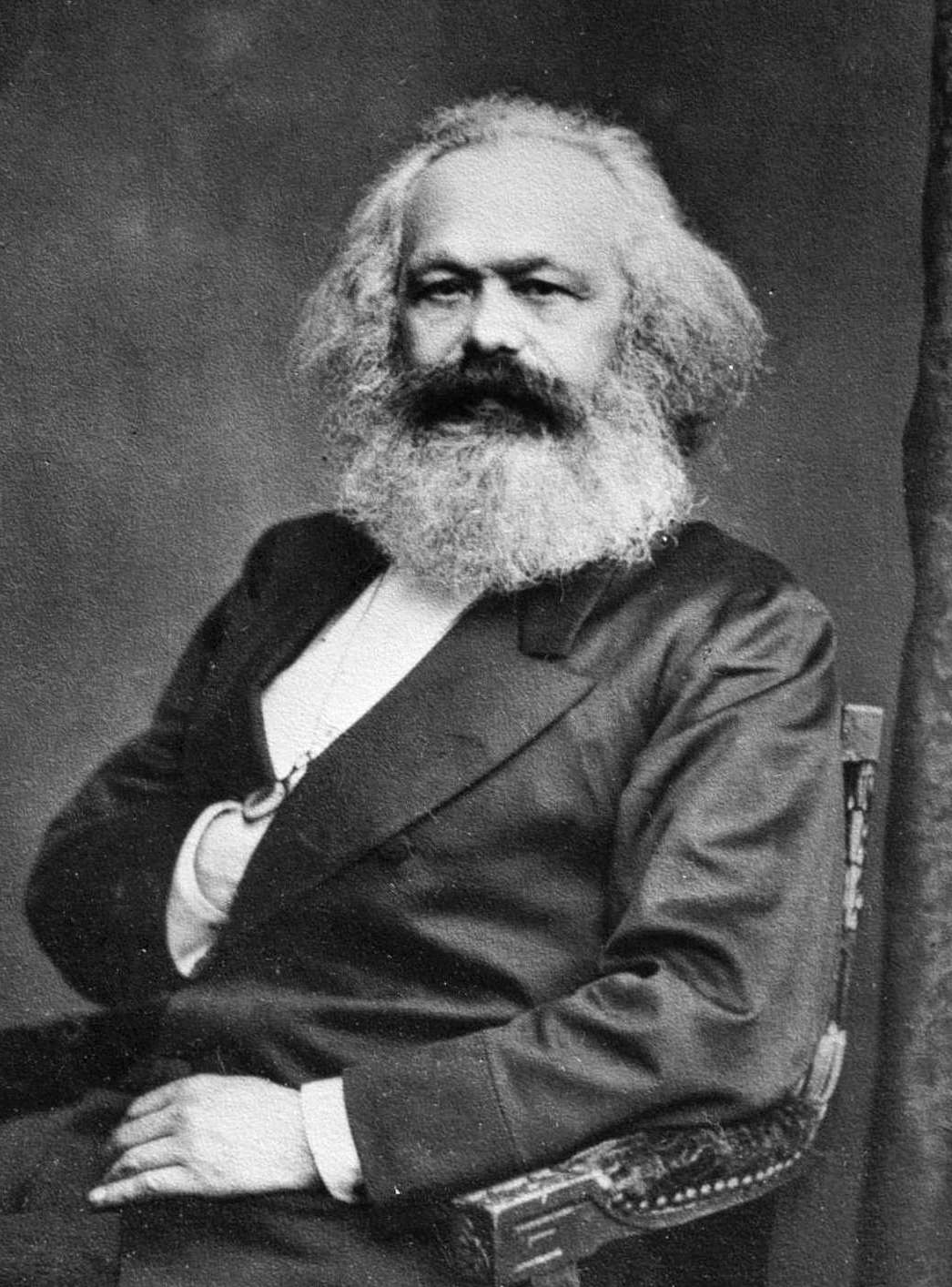
Karl Marx, after whom Marxism is named.

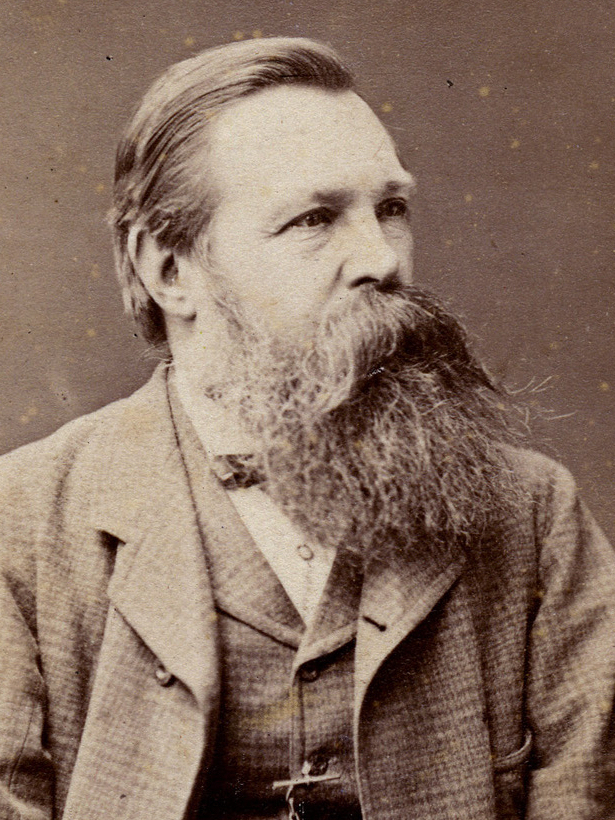
Friedrich Engels, who co-developed Marxism.

Karl Marx and Friedrich Engels introduced Marxism in the 1840s, which advocated revolutionary socialism. As the state bureaucracy was developed in the late 19th century and labour rights were increasingly recognised by national governments, socialist movements were divided on the role of the state. Some objected to the increase in the state's involvement, while others believed that the state was a stronger alternative to protect worker's rights than labour movements. Many of the former moved to anarchism, while many of the latter responded with the development of social democracy.

The Russian far-left group Land and Liberty arose in the 1860s to lead peasants' revolts against the monarchy. It split in 1879 between the populist movement Black Repartition and the anarchist movement Narodnaya Volya. Narodnaya Volya engaged in acts of violence, called propaganda of the deed, to incite revolution. These groups were eradicated following the assassination of Tsar Alexander II in 1881, but the methods used by Narodnaya Volya were adopted by other groups and set the precedent for modern terrorism.

The First International was created in 1864 and lasted until 1872. The Paris Commune was created in 1871. Many national trade unions were established in the 1880s, which coalesced into the Second International in 1889. This group was officially aligned with social democracy but was predominantly influenced by Marxism.

Mikhail Bakunin was influential in developing anarchist ideas in the 19th century, advocating acts of violence instead of political discourse. Errico Malatesta introduced the propaganda of the deed in 1876 when he encouraged the use of violence in Italy to win the support of the working class.

=== Early 20th century ===
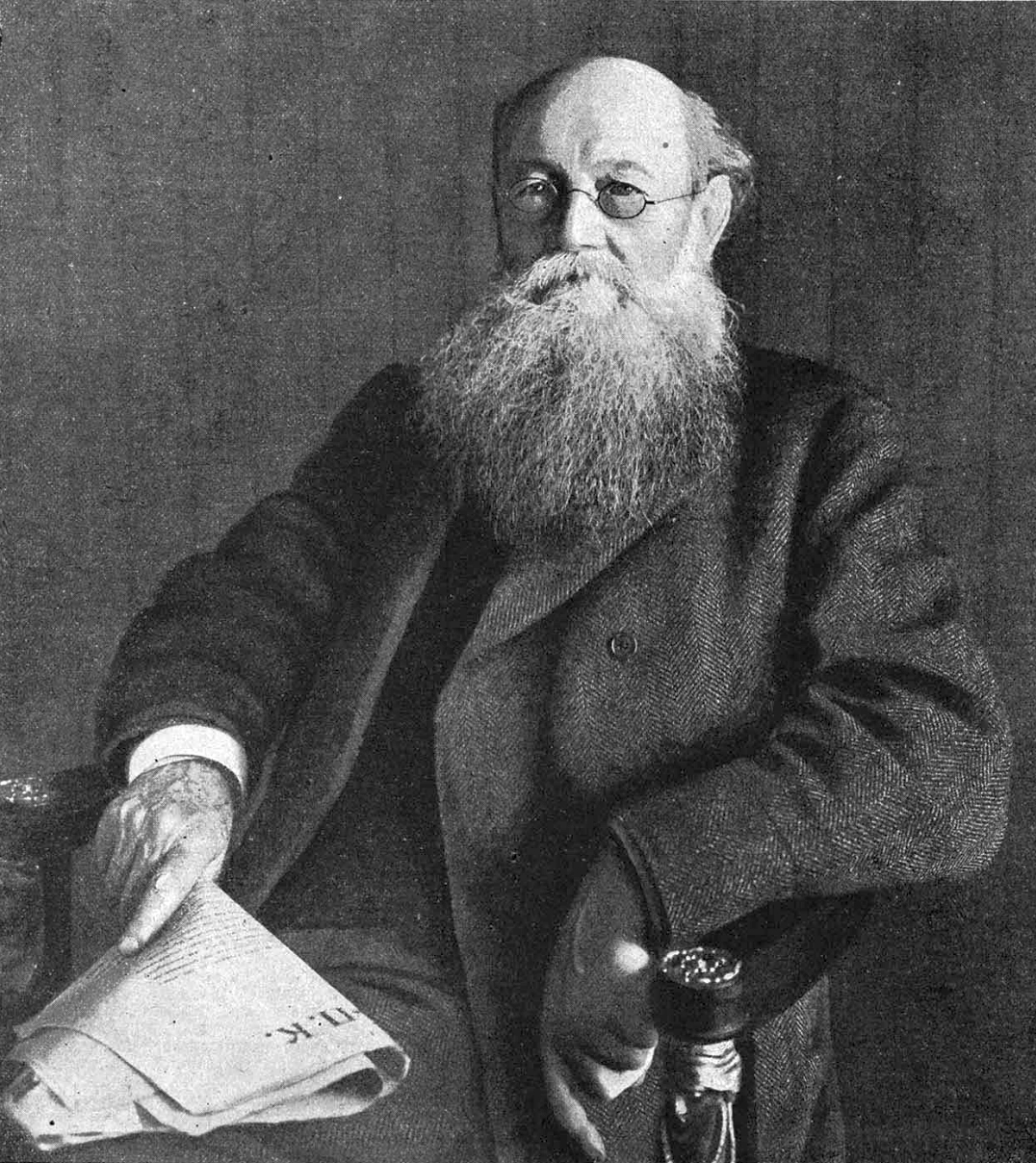
Peter Kropotkin in 1917

East Asian anarchism developed in the 1900s during the Russo-Japanese War, based on the ideas of Japanese writer Kōtoku Shūsui, who was in turn inspired by Peter Kropotkin. This movement saw its greatest prominence in the 1920s in China. Anarcho-syndicalism was developed as a form of anarchism in the late 19th century, and it grew popular around 1900. It remained relevant in far-left politics through 1940. One important syndicalist movement of this period was the Wobblies. Left communism was developed as a criticism of Marxism–Leninism by figures like Rosa Luxemburg and Amadeo Bordiga in the early-20th century.

The modern revolutionary left emerged in the aftermath of World War I. Socialist movements had gained considerable political power in Europe by the 1910s, but they were fractured during the war. Before World War I, socialism was intertwined with the labour movement.

Moderate left-wing nationalist factions split from socialists in defence of their nations during the war, while the remaining far-left adopted a revolutionary cosmopolitan ideology. Opposition to World War I triggered a series of revolutions across Europe. Those in Finland, Germany, Hungary, and Russia were led by socialist movements. Trade unions, workers' councils, and far-left parties were formed in many European nations. Numerous far-left movements developed with different ideological foundations. The strongest far-left movement developed with the Russian Revolution and its establishment of Leninism. The Bolsheviks seized power under the rule of Vladimir Lenin, and Lenin implemented the idea of vanguardism where the Bolsheviks were seen as continuing the revolution and preventing other economic systems from forming. Italian anarchists created the first car bomb in 1920 to carry out the Wall Street bombing in the United States. Anton Pannekoek developed what became council communism in 1920. The Middle East developed an anti-colonial Marxist movement in the 1920s, where it spread from the Russian Revolution. Far-left politics emerged in Central America through the labour movement in the early years of the 20th century. Following the Russian Revolution, this shifted to focus on Marxism–Leninism. Central America had yet to industrialise by this point as Europe had, and it was still dominated by feudal-style land ownership, so most communists felt it had not yet reached the point of revolution. Italian futurism, which was initially a radical left-wing ideology, had a profound effect on the growth of Italian fascism.

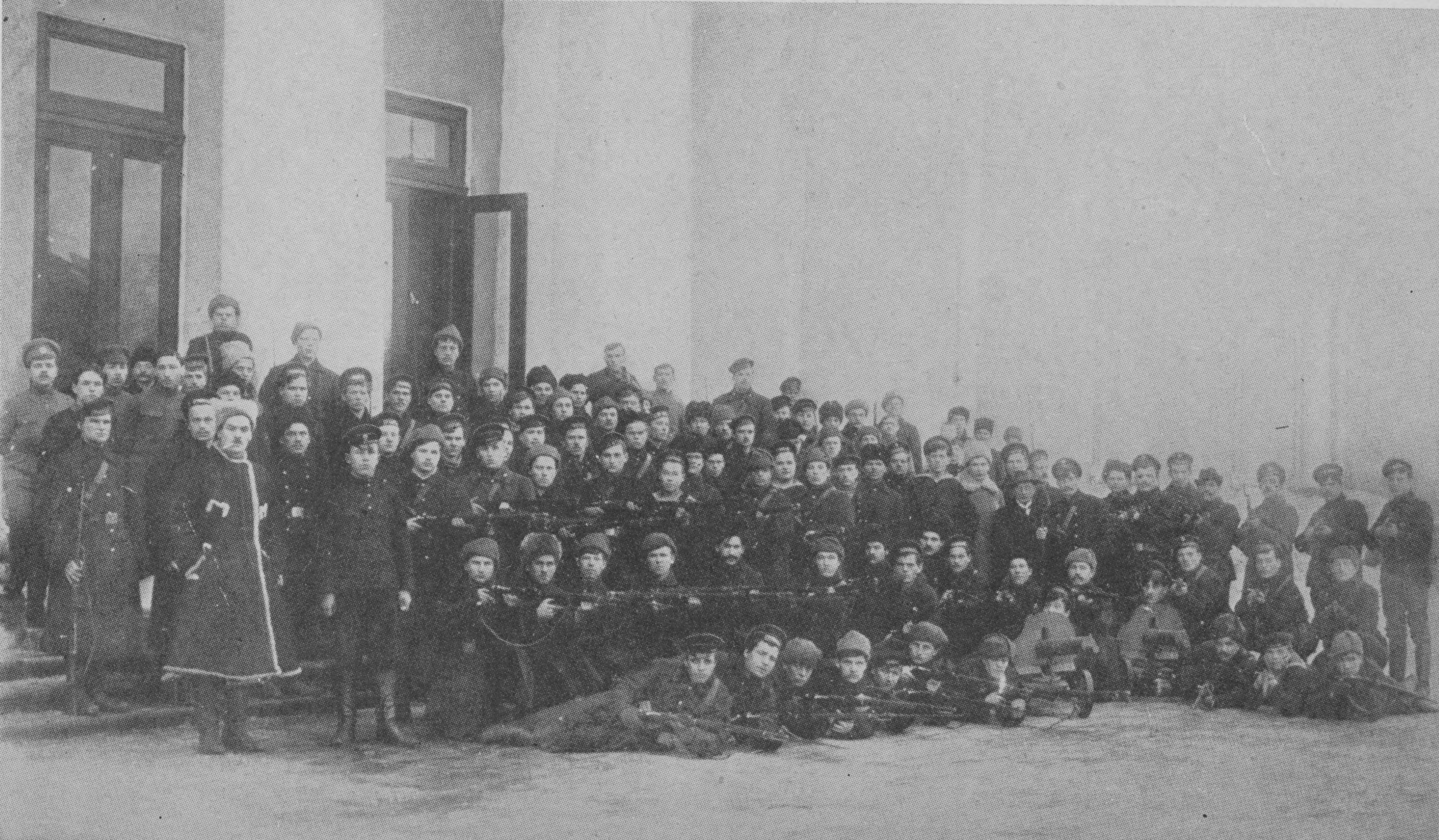
A detachment of Red Guard sailors who dissolved the Constituent Assembly

Communism in early 20th century Europe often gained power in countries with significant polarisation between segments of the population on an ethnic, religious, or economic basis, and in countries that were destabilised by war. It was less prominent in industrialised nations, where social democracy maintained electoral success over Communist parties. The Russian Revolution was the only instance of a successful socialist revolution during this period. Communist groups sought to emulate the Russian Revolution that replaced capitalism with a planned economy and established a system of soviet councils to serve as the dictatorship of the proletariat. Other Communist governments were formed in Bavaria, Finland, and Hungary, but they were short-lived. The Bolsheviks eventually became the Communist Party of the Soviet Union. Communist parties developed in other countries after the Russian Revolution, splitting from the dominant social democratic parties. Throughout its existence, the Soviet Union provided both material and non-material support to Communist parties in other nations, and it provided refuge for the leadership of parties in exile. The Bolsheviks created the Communist International in 1919 to bring together the Communist parties of several nations, and the International Working Union of Socialist Parties existed from 1921 to 1923 for other socialist groups. They hoped to join forces with Western social democrats, but the alliances were never formed. Support for immediate revolution declined among the far-left; it seemed less feasible as state intervention within capitalist nations brought about improvements in quality of life for the working class. The social democratic movement moderated, and much of the European far-left lost influence outside of Russia by 1923.

By 1922, as Russian SFSR became one of the founding countries of Soviet Union, it responded to widespread hunger and poverty with the New Economic Policy, which restored market enterprise for smaller industries. After Lenin's death, a power struggle between Nikolai Bukharin, Leon Trotsky, and Joseph Stalin ended with Stalin taking power by 1928. Stalin implemented his ideology of Marxism–Leninism, which reorganised society and created a cult of personality in his favour. Under the rule of Joseph Stalin, the Soviet Union adopted Stalinism in the 1930s. While the Communist International was initially democratic between its members, it removed disloyal parties while Stalin was in charge. This also entailed the Great Purge in the late 1930s, an interpretation of Lenin's revolutionary violence that saw hundreds of thousands of Stalin's opponents killed, often to be replaced by ambitious loyalists. By this time, Marxism–Leninism was seen as the definitive implementation of communism by its followers globally, justifying the Great Purge as an effort to eradicate fascist infiltrators, with state censorship obscuring the Great Purge's extent. This view was challenged by the Anti-Stalinist left, including anarchists and Trotskyists.

Western Europe largely adopted liberal democracy by the mid-1920s, and social democracy drew socialists to a more moderate stance. The far-left did not have significant political power and instead acted through labour movements, which engaged in strikes and insurrections. Its interest in communist revolution declined. There was not always a clear delineation between the far-left and the centre-left this time as they were often affiliated with the same organisations. Far-left parties in France, Germany, and Spain briefly took power in the 1930s but were eradicated as fascism spread across the continent. The Communist Party of Germany had split from the Social Democratic Party of Germany and became the largest Communist party in Western Europe, performing only 3.5 percent below the Social Democratic Party in the November 1932 election.

The Communist Party of El Salvador and the Communist Party of Honduras both led unsuccessful indigenous and peasants' uprisings in their respective countries during the Great Depression. These parties, along with the Communist Party of Guatemala, were persecuted and largely dismantled as a result.

How to respond to fascism was a question that divided the far left in the interwar years. During its ultra-left "Third Period", the Communist International saw social democrats (who it labelled "social fascists") as an equivalent enemy to Nazism. Trotsky, in contrast, argued for anti-fascist unity just within the far left, in the strategy of the United front. Spain's far left launched the strongest response to the right when it fought the Spanish Civil War from 1936 to 1939. Far-left popular front groups arose in the mid-1930s.

During the Spanish Civil War in the late 1930s, anarcho-syndicalists seized control of multiple regions in Spain, but this ended when the nationalist faction won the war. This, along with the rise of Communism, ended the relevance of anarchism among the far-left globally after 1940. As mass production became more common, the traditional style of labour that anarcho-syndicalists objected to ceased to exist, preventing any significant resurgence in the movement. Trotsky died in 1940, and Trotskyism subsequently underwent a period of lesser influence over the following two decades.

Western opinion of Communists briefly improved in the aftermath of World War II because of Communist contributions to the war effort, and they saw minor electoral success in a few European countries. The French Communist Party and Italian Communist Party briefly became major parties in their respective nations, while the Popular Democratic Front of Italy and the Finnish People's Democratic League were formed as alliances between different far-left groups. Italian Communists moved away from Leninism and democratic centralism in 1944 in favour of mass membership and Catholic influences. Antonio Gramsci, who was active in the 1920s and 1930s, became one of the main figures of Italian Communism. The Cold War began shortly after, and Communist parties again became poorly regarded. The Soviet-backed Communist Party of Germany emerged from World War II as a minor party in West Germany, but it lost popularity over the following years and was banned in 1956.

=== Cold War ===
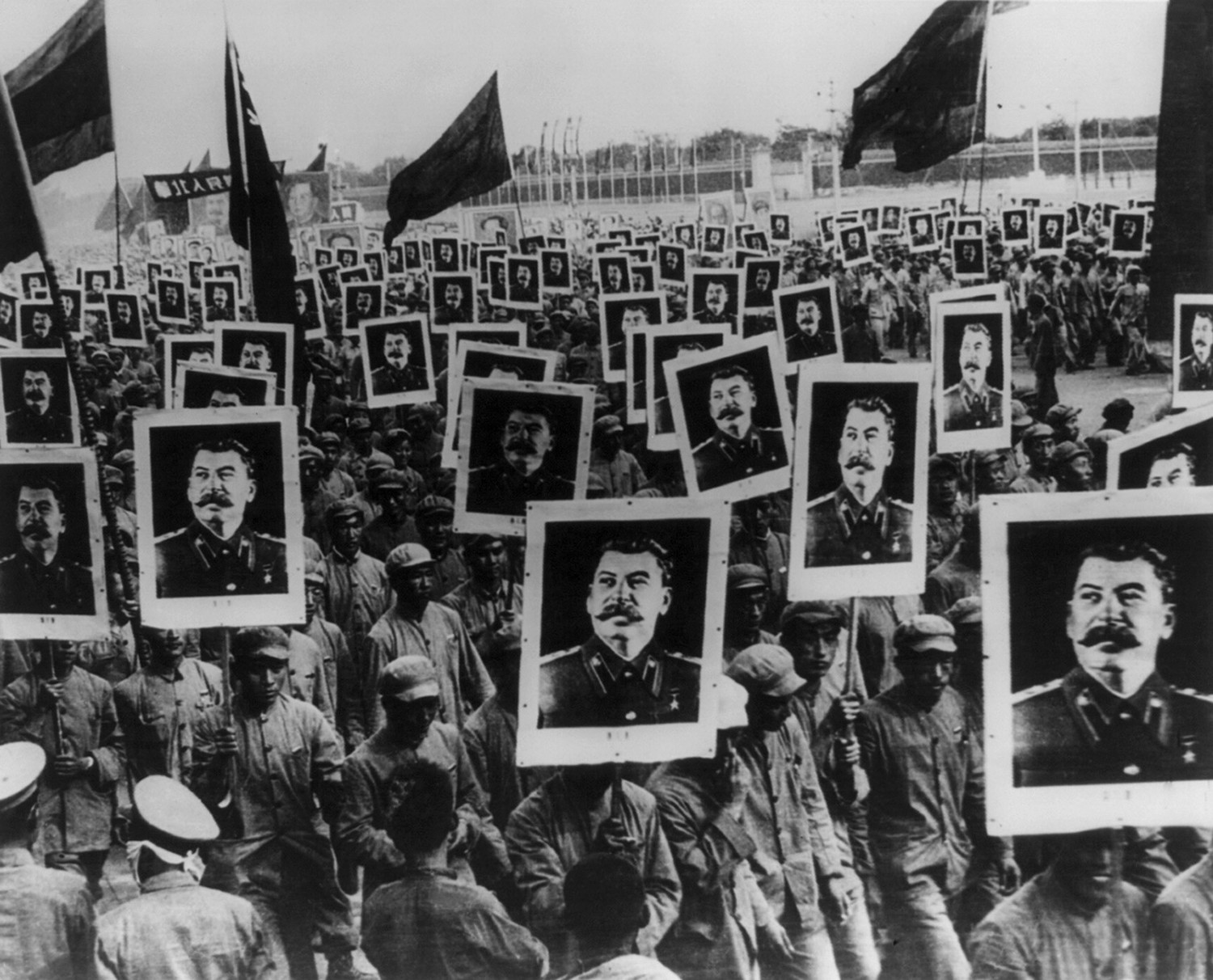
Members of the Chinese Communist Party celebrating Stalin's birthday in 1949

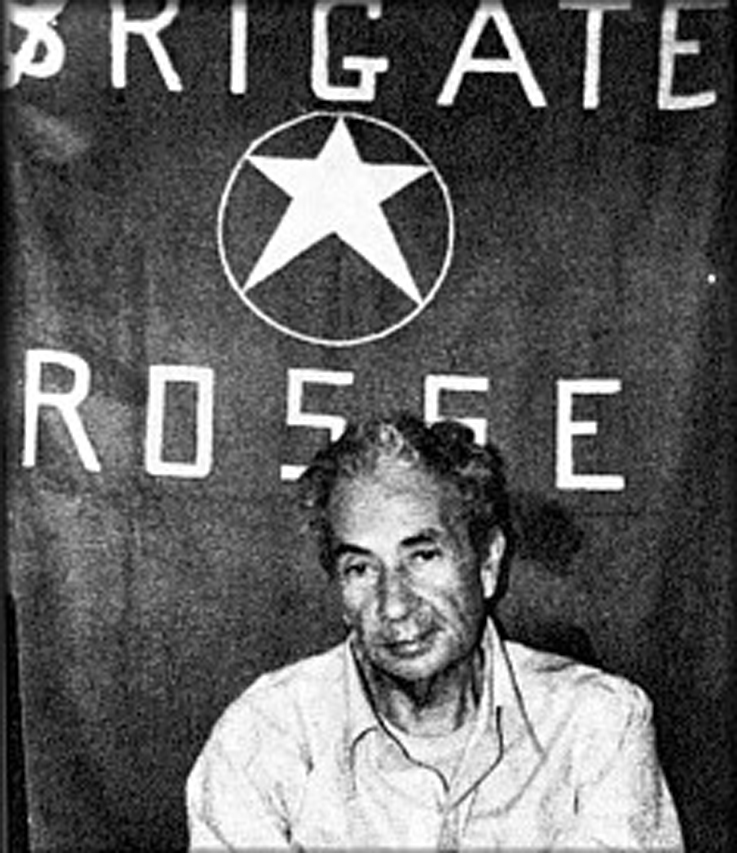
Kidnapping and murder of Aldo Moro by the Red Brigades (1978)

The Cold War began when a major diplomatic rift occurred between liberal Western nations, led by the United States, and communist nations, led by the Soviet Union. Communist parties were effectively outcast within the West, and most were aligned with Stalinism and the Soviet Union. The United States pressured other nations to purge Communist parties from their governments in 1947, and the Italian government created its conventio ad excludendum that effectively disallowed the Italian Communist Party from taking power. The number of West European communists declined significantly, with only France, Italy, and briefly Finland retaining a notable communist presence. Under Soviet pressure, Eastern European communists remained dominant and became Stalinised. By the mid-1950s, the Italian Socialist Party was the most influential anti-communist far-left party in Europe. Violent revolution was discouraged as the Cold War began, emanating from fears that Western nations would intervene.

The Soviet Union's influence during and after World War II spread Communism, directly and indirectly, to the rest of Eastern Europe and into Southeast Europe. Several of these countries became people's democracies, which maintained some liberal mixed economies before eventually coming under the influence of Stalinism. New communist governments were formed in Albania, Bulgaria, Czechoslovakia, East Germany, Hungary, Romania, and Yugoslavia. Most far-left governments adopted the Leninist system of vanguardism. China and North Korea took on the Marxist—Leninist variant that developed under Stalin's rule of the Soviet Union. The development of post-industrial society and postmaterialism in Western Europe caused many of the traditional sectors associated with communism to dissipate. Communist International had been dissolved in 1943, and it was replaced by Cominform as the main communist international in 1947. This lasted until 1956.

While Soviet-style Communist parties dominated the far left in the 1920s through the 1950s, the far left became more diverse during the Cold War. Eurocommunism, a gradualist and democratic approach to socialism, developed in the 1960s and was supported by the Communist Parties of France and of Italy. Other far-left ideologies formed their own party families.

Communist movements resurged in Central America during the 1940s and 1950s despite repression from authoritarian governments, and Marxism–Leninism lost influence among these groups. The People's Vanguard Party in Costa Rica aligned with the winning coalition in the 1944 general election.

Following Stalin's death, the workers of several Eastern European countries staged revolutions against Communist rule, which were suppressed by the Soviet military. Many of these countries were led by Stalinist rulers, who were forced out and replaced by the subsequent Soviet government. Yugoslavia distanced itself as a neutral Communist nation, aligned with neither the East nor the West.

Arab socialist groups took power in the Middle East during the 1950s and 1960s, and they persecuted the preexisting Marxist groups to replace them as the region's predominant far-left movement. The Japanese Communist Party, supporting scientific socialism, was the far-left opposition to the dominant Liberal Democratic Party of Japan in the 1950s. Indonesia's far left was destroyed in a series of anti-communist mass killings in the mid-1960s, ending the Communist Party of Indonesia.

The Chinese Communist Party had been active since 1921, but it did not seize power in China until its victory in the Chinese Civil War in 1949. As with the Soviet Union, the newly formed People's Republic of China carried out purges of political enemies, killing millions of landowners. The peasants were not targeted, however, instead using them as a base of political support. In the late 1950s and early 1960s, China under the rule of Mao Zedong distanced itself from the Soviet Union. Maoism grew in popularity as an alternative to Soviet-style communism, but it did not result in any stable governments outside of China. At the same time, North Korea and North Vietnam were established as communist governments, triggering the Korean War and the Vietnam War against South Korea and South Vietnam, respectively. By the late 1970s, Maoism in China was replaced by the ideology of Deng Xiaoping, which restored the private sector and market pricing.

Many European Communist parties were fractured by different Marxist ideologies beginning in the 1950s, with the greatest challenges coming from Maoist and Trotskyist factions. Some European Communist parties saw Maoism as non-hierarchal and internationalist and adopted it for these reasons, but European Maoism only became a major force in the Albanian Party of Labour. Trotskyists gained influence among the European far left in the late 1960s and early 1970s, particularly in France and the United Kingdom, but it was plagued by inter-fighting, which limited its reach. The Communist Party of Finland lost its influence in the 1960s as a schism emerged between pro-Soviet and pro-modernisation factions.

Left-wing nationalist movements developed in colonial territories in the 1960s, leading to rapid decolonisation, though traditional far-left ideas played a relatively small role in independence activities.

Two major Latin American far-left ideologies emerged in the 1960s: Guevarism and Latin American liberation theology. Guevarism emerged from the Cuban Revolution. The revolution's success dispelled the common belief among communists that socialist revolution could only occur after democratic and anti-imperialist reformist movements were successful. Many guerrilla militant groups formed in Central America over the following decades, triggering the Guatemalan Civil War and the Salvadoran Civil War. The Sandinista National Liberation Front led the Nicaraguan Revolution in 1979 and held power in Nicaragua until it was voted out in the 1990 general election. Latin American liberation theology came amid the Second Vatican Council and the Second Episcopal Conference of Latin America, popularising far-left ideas among some Catholic Churches in the region.

In the mid-20th century, agricultural workers, the unemployed, and white-collar workers replaced industrial workers as the main far-left demographics in Western Europe. Highly educated people surpassed blue-collar workers as the primary far-left demographic by the end of the 1960s. The New Left developed in Western Europe as an alternative to orthodox Communism in the 1950s, taking positions on social issues and identity politics. It was unable to overcome traditional Communist parties except those of Scandinavia, where Communists were already sympathetic to ideas like Eurocommunism and humanism. Communist Party of Denmark leader Aksel Larsen was expelled from his party for his opposition to the 1956 Soviet invasion of Hungary, so he formed the Socialist People's Party that became the new dominant far-left force in Danish politics. The rise of the New Left was associated with the rise of new social movements and the counterculture of the 1960s, which also saw the revival of anarchism. The Western far left as a whole resurged in the 1960s and 1970s as American hegemony and capitalist systems came under scrutiny. There were periods of civil unrest and youth revolts in several European nations. The Vietnam War was a catalyst for New Left activity. Green politics developed as an offshoot of the New Left, but it was deradicalised by the end of the 20th century and became a centre-left movement.

New far-left socialist parties were formed across Western Europe, many Communist parties cut ties with the Soviet Union, and other Marxist movements such as Maoism, Trotskyism, and workerism gained a presence in several countries' politics. Maoism significantly influenced far-left movements around the world in the 1970s and 1980s. Eurocommunism developed in response to the Soviet Union in the 1960s and 1970s to provide a democratic alternative for far-left ideas. It supports the expansion of European-style welfare states and mixed economies until they resemble communist society. The People's Alliance of Iceland had remained electorally relevant by avoiding Soviet influence and adopted Eurocommunism to some success. The spread of Eurocommunism meant that Soviet-aligned communist parties declined in Western Europe. It proved unable to maintain its influence by the 1980s as its supporters were unable to reconcile vanguardism with political pluralism.

Smaller far-left groups revitalised interest in revolutionary communism in Western Europe. Maoist groups called the K-Gruppen emerged from the student movement in Germany. Maoist and Trotskyist groups briefly flourished in France in the 1960s amid the French student movement and opposition to the Algerian War. Italian Marxists like Antonio Negri introduced autonomism later in the decade. Support for the 1960s-era far left declined by the 1970s, giving violent revolutionaries more influence in the movement which further its decreased support. Earth First! emerged in the 1980s in the United States, combining radical environmentalism and anarchism with other far-left social issues.

The Communist and Allies Group existed as a political group of the European Parliament in the European Union during the 1970s and 1980s. Far-left parties had representation in the Nordic countries during the Cold War. In Sweden, a practice developed between the 1970s and the 1990s where social democrats would vote for the formerly Communist Left Party so left-wing coalitions could be formed. The Portuguese Communist Party and the Portuguese Democratic Movement played a major role in the Carnation Revolution. The French Communist Party was included in the French government of François Mitterrand in the early 1980s. This wave of European far-left support dissipated in the 1980s as workers lost influence in the economy, neoliberalism became dominant, and the United States re-exerted influence over Europe. As the economies of developed nations shifted, the far-left aligned with the workers of large corporations as opposed to small businesses and subcontractors.

Arabic far-left groups reemerged in the 1980s and 1990s, but they often aligned with the traditional authoritarian governments as a means to oppose Islamism. This prevented them from creating a party structure and caused leftists to act through decentralised movements. Far-left Arab socialists were one of two groups alongside Arab nationalists that made up the New Arab Left, which began in Palestine and influenced other left-wing movements in the Arab world. Hadash formed as a communist coalition in Israel with a focus on the country's Arab population. Kurdish nationalism emerged as the predominant far-left ideology in Turkey after a period of political violence and the subsequent coup eradicated the previous leftist groups in 1980.

=== Dissolution of the Soviet Union ===
Communist nations in Europe struggled economically in the 1980s, and many faced popular revolts. The Soviet Union moved away from ideas of international communism as such efforts came to be seen as too inconvenient. Soviet leader Mikhail Gorbachev effectively abandoned communism, leading the nation toward liberalism in its final years. The final Soviet-led international communist meeting was held in November 1987 to mark the seventieth anniversary of the October Revolution. It included not only communist parties, but other left-wing parties as the Soviet policy of socialism in one country disintegrated.

Communist and socialist parties severely declined in Western Europe after the dissolution of the Soviet Union. Many communist parties were unable to survive once the Soviet Union no longer existed to finance them. The far-left was challenged by the neoliberal consensus after the dissolution of the Soviet Union. Intergovernmental institutions and increasing globalisation embedded neoliberal economics into the global economy, making it harder for the far-left to work against it. The end of history theory was proposed by Francis Fukuyama, asserting that the neoliberal consensus effectively ended far-left politics They remained largely irrelevant for several years until a period of regrowth toward the end of the 1990s. Many of the communist parties effectively disappeared from politics, while others rebranded or moderated. The European transnational political party Communist and Allies Group split in 1989 as Left Unity and the European United Left, and the latter merged with the Nordic Green Left Alliance to form GUE/NGL in 1994. The Party of the European Left emerged in 2004.

In many Eastern European countries, communist parties were banned by the new governments. Most communist parties in Eastern Europe moved toward the centre-left. The Socialist Party of Ukraine was the only electorally relevant democratic socialist movement of Eastern Europe, but it also moved away from socialism over time. Those that remained communist held more influence than their counterparts in Western Europe. Moldova was an exception to the rejection of communism, where the communists won presidential elections throughout the 2000s.

As the social democratic vote was already contested by green parties and the New Left, formerly communist parties in Western Europe often shifted toward democratic socialism. Exceptions occurred in Italy and Poland, where the respective parties had already been moving toward social democracy. Surviving far-left parties shifted toward domestic politics and made attempts to distinguish themselves from Soviet-style communism. Parties like the Communist Party of Greece maintained their adherence to traditional communism after the dissolution of the Soviet Union, while others like the Communist Refoundation Party in Italy tried to introduce new communist ideas. The Communist Party of the Russian Federation and the Party of Communists of the Republic of Moldova remained relevant in the former Soviet Union, while the Communist Party of Bohemia and Moravia emerged as the most prominent communist party in East-Central Europe.

The far-left was able to rebuild limited support by the end of the decade. Supporters of the far-left in Europe at this time were more likely to be professional workers, students, and the unemployed. The share of working class supporters declined as they sought other ideologies. It appealed to anti-neoliberalism and tried to rebuild ties with the working class. Most far-left parties in Europe prioritised a broader societal shift to the left instead of disputing individual policies. Far-left parties in Europe became more amenable to joining coalitions. Many of them became more open to reformist politics as a temporary means to combat neoliberalism. Detailed platforms of societal reconstructions were avoided so as not to emulate Stalinism. The far-left primarily expressed itself through movements led by unions, pacifists, and alter-globalisation advocates instead of traditional political parties. Over time, unions became less involved in these and social activism became more common. Despite his criticism of leftism, Ted Kaczynski became influential within green anarchism and anarcho-primitivism with his essay Industrial Society and Its Future in the 1990s, which received attention because of Kaczynski's use of letter bombs to forward the cause.

Far-left parties reappeared in post-Soviet states in response to voter frustration with the new governments. Leftist parties in Russia and the Balkans exchanged Marxism–Leninism for left-wing nationalism. The Indonesian party system destabilised after the fall of Suharto in 1998, and the traditional leftist electorate—trade unions and peasant associations–did not develop political representation.

=== 21st century ===
Of the five Communist states that survived into the 21st century, three of them — China, Vietnam, and Laos — had restored private ownership and reintegrated with global capitalist markets although state and public control continued as well. For instance, Peter Nolan argues that land in China was decollectivized but not privatised, with control of land remaining in the hands of the community.

At the start of the 21st century, the far-left was associated with the global justice movement and supported populist leaders. This reached its height with the 1999 Seattle WTO protests and protests against the 27th G8 summit in 2001, which symbolised a growing rejection of the neoliberal consensus. The movement began holding the annual World Social Forum in 2001. Its influence diminished following the September 11 attacks, but it survived as a leading force in opposition to the Iraq War.

Far-left violence decreased dramatically by the 21st century, with a limited presence remaining in developing nations and only a small number of isolated attacks in developed nations. The Party of the European Left was established in 2004 as a European political party for the left and far-left. The far-left parties during this time were rarely new creations, instead descending from earlier far-left parties of the 20th century. Among the European great powers, Germany was the only one where the far-left made strong electoral performances in the 2000s, with the prominence of the Party of Democratic Socialism and WASG, which merged to become Die Linke in 2007. While the Italian Communist Party was historically the most prominent communist party in Western Europe, the Italian far-left fractured and was dissolved into the centre-left in the 2000s. The French far-left did not face significant gains or losses as other European far-left groups did at the time. Left-wing populism experienced a surge at the start of the 21st century beginning with the rise of Hugo Chávez and Evo Morales in Latin America.

The environmentalist left was targeted by the United States government in Operation Backfire during the Green Scare in the 2000s, in which environmentalist groups carried out attacks and acts of sabotage. The anonymous ultra-left works of the Invisible Committee in France were produced in 2008, advocating a unified resistance to capitalism during times of crisis. Individualists Tending to the Wild was formed in Mexico as a self-described eco-terrorism group in the 2010s.

Leftist politics diminished in the Arab world by the 21st century as autocratic governments placed token opposition from leftist figures in the legislature. Revolutionary left-wing politics were not prominent during the 2011 Arab Spring, although socialist groups played a role e.g. in the Egyptian revolution and anarchist ideas were put into practice in the local councils established as part of the Syrian revolution. In 2012, the autonomous region Rojava in northwestern Syria established self-governance based on an anarchist direct democracy at the local level and a one-party state at the regional level.

The 2010s also saw a global wave of protest movements against austerity and finance capitalism, including the Occupy movement and the indignados, in which radical left ideas were prominent.

The anti-industrialist Zadists became active in France in the 2010s as they occupied and squatted on the sites of planned development projects. Far-left militant groups participated in the war against the Islamic State in the 2010s. Anarchist and autonomist movements were active during the French Yellow vests protests in 2018, where they competed with the far-right for control of the movement.

==== Emergence and positioning of the populist left ====
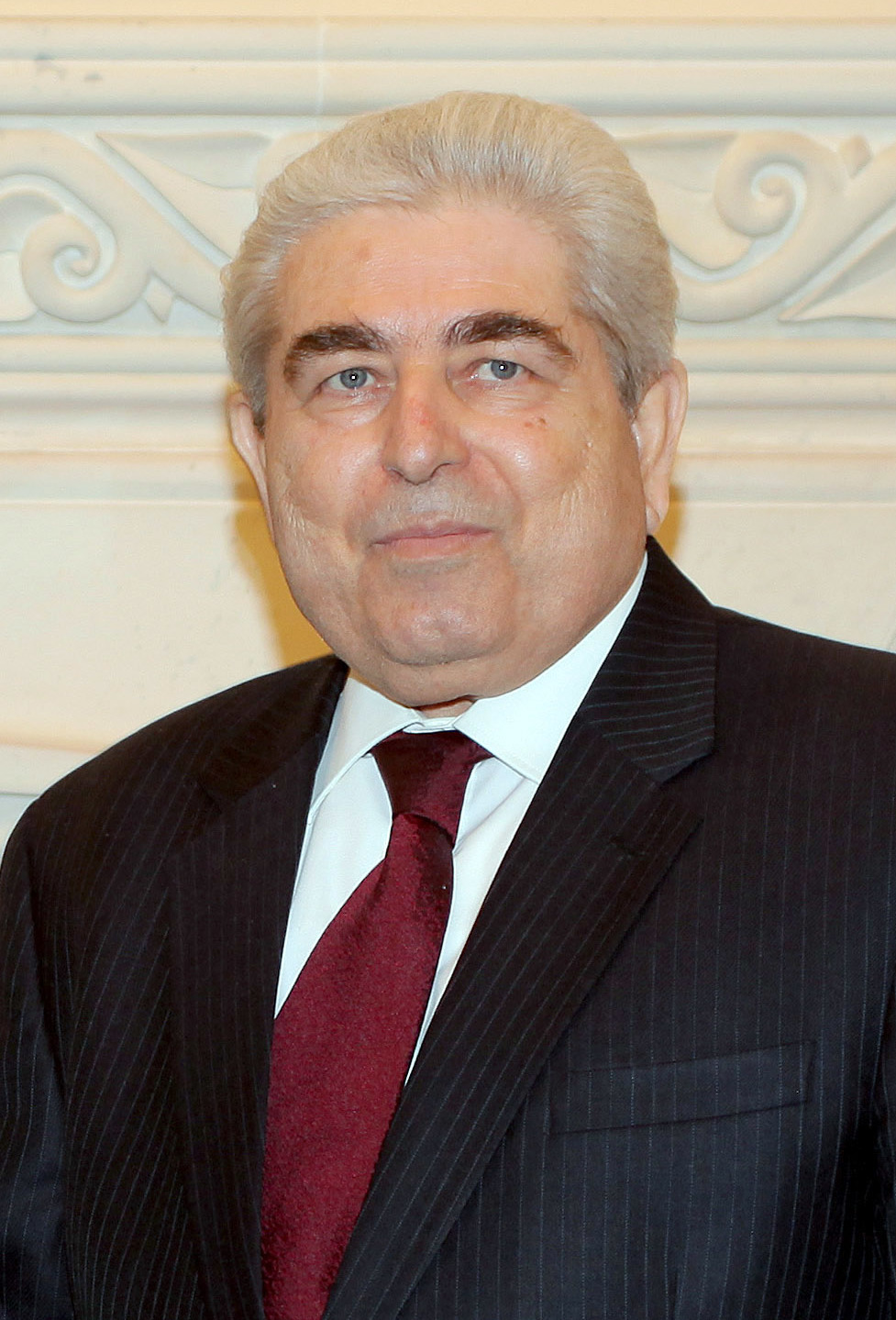
Demetris Christofias, the fourth general secretary of the Progressive Party of Working People, who served as the President of Cyprus from 2008 to 2013

Far-left parties became more prominent in democratic systems following the Great Recession. There is disagreement as to whether this is associated with an overall increase in support. Some of these parties, such as La France Insoumise in France, Podemos in Spain, and Syriza in Greece, deliberately incorporated populism into their identity. At the same time, in the United Kingdom and the United States of America, populist movements formed around Jeremy Corbyn and Bernie Sanders. Bernie Sanders gained support from the far-left in the 2016 United States presidential election.

When far-left parties took power, they were forced to work within national and international systems that prevented them from unilaterally changing the economic structure. They moved their focus away from the long-term goal of socialism so they could seek broader support from anti-neoliberal coalitions. They adopted support for a left-libertarian welfare state based on Keynesianism and social justice as a temporary measure on the path toward socialist society.

The communist Progressive Party of Working People controlled the government in Cyprus from 2008 to 2013. Far-left parties in Greece, Portugal, and Spain made significant electoral gains in 2015, including Syriza taking control of the Greek government. Gains beyond these countries were limited, as right-wing populism was instead boosted in other countries.

Left-wing extremist activity is uncommon in 21st-century Europe. It is even less common in Canada and the United States, where it aligns with movements like Antifa and Black Lives Matter as well as radical environmentalist and other social justice movements. The far-left became more prominent in the United States in opposition to Donald Trump following the far-right Unite the Right rally in 2017. While the American far-left had developed over the previous years as a movement for economic justice, it shifted toward anti-racism as its primary cause, especially after the murder of George Floyd by police officers in 2020, which became a focal point of the anti-racism movement.

The European far-left was split on the issue of COVID-19 lockdowns, in which some found government measures to be oppressive but others counter-protested against far-right opposition to the lockdowns.

== Far-left terrorism ==
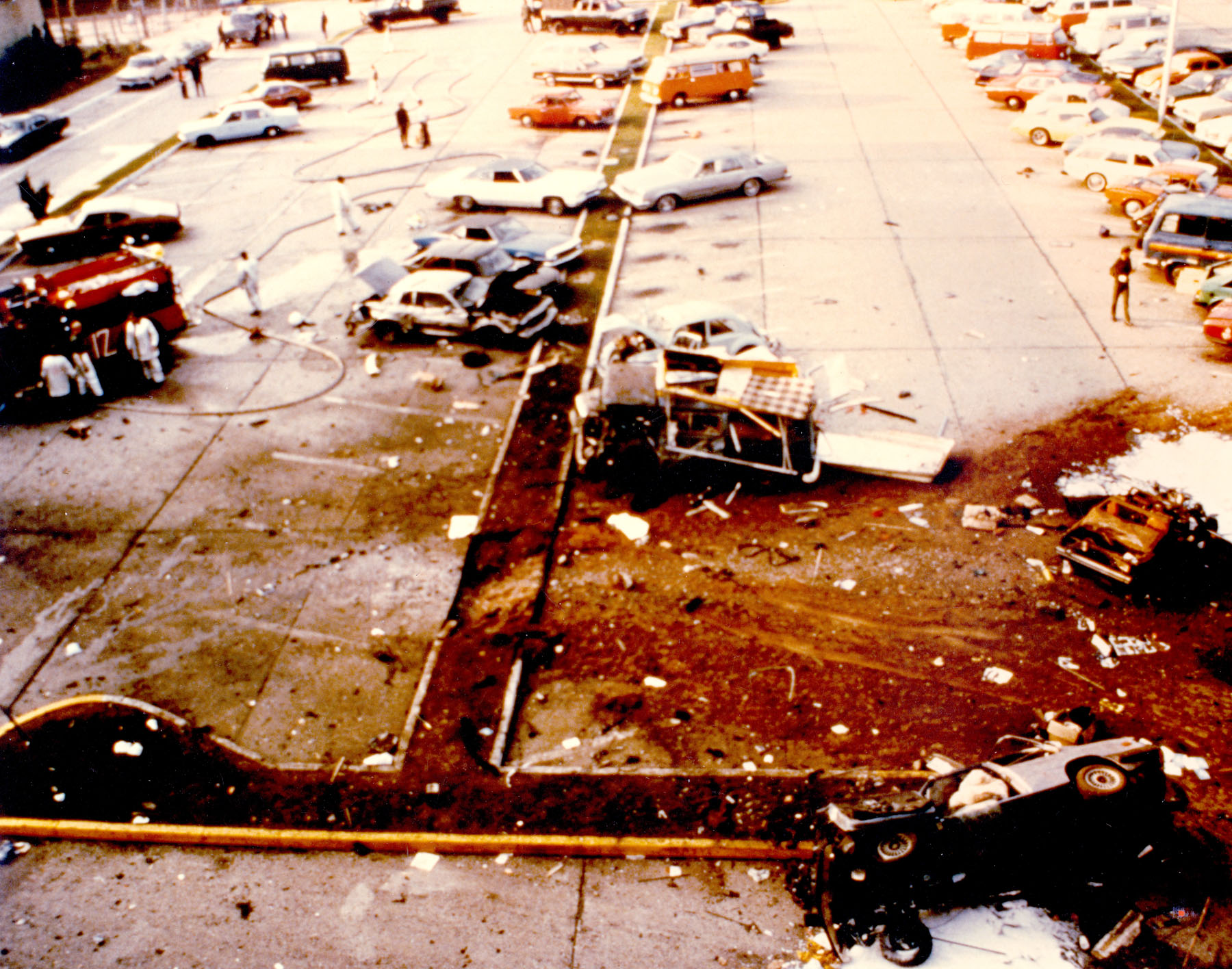
Aftermath of the Red Army Faction (RAF) bombing attack of the U.S. Air Forces Europe headquarters at Ramstein Air Base, West Germany (1981)

Historically, violence has been widely accepted on the far left as a means to enact societal change. The anti-authoritarian far left may consider violence justified in combatting repressive forces. Revolutionary far-left groups might organise themselves into underground movements or carry out violent insurgencies. Insurgencies are only viable in developing nations where the state is not capable of defeating the group. According to political scientist Ignacio Sánchez-Cuenca, as support for the far left decreases, violent groups shift their focus from attacks against the state to attacks for survival, such as freeing its members from prison. However, many on the far left criticise the use of violence. Far-left actors are rarely a major focus of terrorism studies in comparison to other motives like jihadism.

Many far-left student protest movements, typically associated with the New Left, formed violent revolutionary organisations between the 1960s and the 1980s. These included the National Liberation Army in Colombia, Action Directe in France, the Red Army Faction in Germany, the Red Brigades in Italy, the Japanese Red Army, Shining Path in Peru, the Revolutionary Youth Federation of Turkey, and Weather Underground in the United States. Other violent far-left groups formed in response to democratisation of their respective countries, including 17N in Greece, FP-25 in Portugal, and GRAPO in Spain. Left-wing militant groups were largely eradicated in the 1980s, and popular conceptions of terrorism began to focus on jihadism instead of far-left politics. Other far-left militant organisations of the time included the CPI (Maoist), Montoneros, New People's Army, Prima Linea, and the Tupamaros. In 2021, the European Union considered the Conspiracy of Fire Nuclei in Greece and the Informal Anarchist Federation in Italy to be the most serious far-left terrorism threats in Europe.

According to Sánchez-Cuenca, 194 people were killed by anarchist attacks in the developed world between 1875 and 1925. Some attacks targeted political leaders, while others such as the Liceu bombing were directed at civilians. Most attacks carried out by radical environmentalists have targeted property, with attacks on individuals being rare. Insurgencies are able to control territory, protecting them from the state and giving them a population from which they can draw support. These insurgencies have been successful in nations such as Cambodia, Cuba, Nepal, Nicaragua, and North Vietnam.

== See also ==
- ACAB
- Far-right politics
- Hard left
- Left-wing politics
- Radical egalitarianism
- Radical left
- Ultra-leftism

=== Anarchism ===
- Anarchist communism
- Anarchism without adjectives
- Collectivist anarchism
- Anarcho-syndicalism
- Contemporary anarchism
- Mutualism
- Post-left anarchism

=== Communism and Marxism ===
- Centrist Marxism
- Left communism
- Marxism–Leninism
- Trotskyism
- Maoism

=== Historical ===
- Ultra-radicalism
  - Jacobinism (Neo-)
  - Radical republicanism
- Utopian socialism

== Bibliography ==
- Bobbio, Norberto (1996). Left and Right: The Significance of a Political Distinction. University of Chicago Press. ISBN 978-0-226-06245-7.
- Breslauer, George W. (2021). The Rise and Demise of World Communism. Oxford University Press. ISBN 978-0-19-757969-5.
- Carter, Neil; Keith, Daniel; Sindre, Gyda M.; Vasilopoulou, Sofia, eds. (2023). The Routledge Handbook of Political Parties. Routledge. doi:10.4324/9780429263859. ISBN 978-0-429-55441-4.
  - Bremer, Björn. "Social democracy". In Carter et al. (2023), pp. 161–172.
  - Carter, Neil. "Green Parties". In Carter et al. (2023), pp. 185–196.
  - Keith, Daniel; March, Luke. "Radical left parties". In Carter et al. (2023), pp. 173–184.
  - Kraetzschmar, Hendrik; Resta, Valeria. "Political parties in the Arab Middle East". In Carter et al. (2023), pp. 414–425.
  - Mazzoleni, Oscar; Heinisch, Reinhard. "Party change beyond the 'classical models?' The role of agency, context and democracy". In Carter et al. (2023), pp. 9–19.
  - Ufen, Andreas. "Political parties in Southeast Asia". In Carter et al. (2023), pp. 371–381.
  - Vasilopoulou, Sofia. "Parties and European integration". In Carter et al. (2023), pp. 301–311.
- Cavatorta, Francesco; Storm, Lise; Resta, Valeria, eds. (2021). Routledge Handbook on Political Parties in the Middle East and North Africa. Routledge. ISBN 978-0-367-21986-4.
  - Barreñada, Isaías. "Palestinian parties in Israel". In Cavatorta, Storm & Resta (2021), pp. 205–217.
  - Del Panta, Gianni. "The workers and the left are not one hand". In Cavatorta, Storm & Resta (2021), pp. 295–306.
  - Gumuscu, Sebnem. "Democratic backsliding in Turkey". In Cavatorta, Storm & Resta (2021), pp. 192–204.
  - Jebari, Idriss. "The rise and fall of the Arab Left". In Cavatorta, Storm & Resta (2021), pp. 17–32.
- Chiocchetti, Paolo (2016). The Radical Left Party Family in Western Europe, 1989–2015 (E-book ed.). London, England: Routledge. ISBN 978-1-317-22186-9 – via Google Books.
- Freeden, Michael; Sargent, Lyman Tower; Stears, Marc (15 August 2013). The Oxford Handbook of Political Ideologies. OUP Oxford. ISBN 978-0-19-166371-0.
  - Brown, Archie. "Communism". In Freeden, Sargent & Stears (2013).
- Greene, Kenneth F. (2010). "A resource theory of single-party dominance". In Boucek, Françoise; Bogaards, Matthijs (eds.). Dominant Political Parties and Democracy. Routledge. ISBN 978-0-415-48582-1.
- Hough, Dan; Olsen, Jonathan; Koss, Michael, eds. (2010). "From Pariahs to Players?". Left Parties in National Governments. Palgrave Macmillan. pp. 1–15. ISBN 978-0-230-28270-4.
- Levy, Carl (8 May 2011). "Social Histories of Anarchism". Journal for the Study of Radicalism. 4 (2): 1–44. doi:10.1353/jsr.2010.0003. ISSN 1930-1197. S2CID 144317650.
- Lutz, James M.; Ulmschneider, Georgia Wralstad (2019). "Civil Liberties, National Security and U.S. Courts in Times of Terrorism". Perspectives on Terrorism. 13 (6): 43–57. JSTOR 26853740.
- March, Luke; Mudde, Cas (1 April 2005). "What's Left of the Radical Left? The European Radical Left After 1989: Decline and Mutation". Comparative European Politics. 3 (1). London, England: Palgrave Macmillan: 23–49. doi:10.1057/palgrave.cep.6110052. ISSN 1740-388X. S2CID 55197396 – via ResearchGate.
- March, Luke (2011). Radical Left Parties in Europe. Routledge. ISBN 978-0-203-15487-8.
- Marshall, Peter (1993). Demanding the Impossible: A History of Anarchism. Oakland, California: PM Press. ISBN 978-1-6048-6064-1.
- Moya, Jose C. (2015). "Transference, culture, and critique The Circulation of Anarchist Ideas and Practices". In Laforcade, Geoffroy de (ed.). In Defiance of Boundaries: Anarchism in Latin American History. Kirwin R. Shaffer. University Press of Florida. ISBN 978-0-8130-5138-3. Archived from the original on 9 August 2020.
- Newman, Michael (2005). Socialism: A Very Short Introduction. OUP Oxford. ISBN 978-0-19-157789-5.
- Rooduijn, Matthijs; Burgoon, Brian; van Elsas, Erika J; van de Werfhorst, Herman G (2017). "Radical distinction: Support for radical left and radical right parties in Europe". European Union Politics. 18 (4): 536–559. doi:10.1177/1465116517718091. ISSN 1465-1165. PMC 5697563. PMID 29187802.
- van der Linden, Marcel (2022). The Cambridge History of Socialism. Vol. 1. Cambridge University Press. ISBN 978-1-108-48134-2.
- Visser, Mark; Lubbers, Marcel; Kraaykamp, Gerbert; Jaspers, Eva (2014). "Support for radical left ideologies in Europe". European Journal of Political Research. 53 (3): 541–558. doi:10.1111/1475-6765.12048. hdl:2066/129529.
- Zúquete, José Pedro, ed. (2023a). The Palgrave Handbook of Left-Wing Extremism. Vol. 1. Palgrave Macmillan. ISBN 978-3-031-30896-3.
  - Backes, Uwe. "Left-Wing Extremism: The Conceptual Dimension". In Zúquete (2023a), pp. 3–22.
  - Davies, Garth; Zdjelar, Vanja. "Left-Wing Extremism: The Conceptual Dimension". In Zúquete (2023a), pp. 23–54.
  - Gray, Phillip W. "Vanguardism and Leftwing Extremism". In Zúquete (2023a), pp. 91–104.
  - Jesse, Eckhard. "Left-Wing Extremism in Germany". In Zúquete (2023a), pp. 173—192.
  - Jungkunz, Sebastian. "The Measurement of Left-Wing Extremist Attitudes". In Zúquete (2023a), pp. 141–156.
  - Krüusselmann, Katharina; Weggemans, Daan. "Radicalization and Left-Wing Extremism". In Zúquete (2023a), pp. 55–68.
  - Sánchez-Cuenca, Ignacio. "Left-Wing Extremism and Violence". In Zúquete (2023a), pp. 105–119.
  - Sommier, Isabelle. "France". In Zúquete (2023a), pp. 193–206.
- Zúquete, José Pedro, ed. (2023b). The Palgrave Handbook of Left-Wing Extremism. Vol. 2. Palgrave Macmillan. ISBN 978-3-031-30896-3.
  - Álvarez, Alberto Martín. "The Revolutionary Left in Central America". In Zúquete (2023b), pp. 85–100.
  - Mareš, Miroslav. "Environmental Apocalypticism, Other Forms of Eco-Extremism, and Their Links to the Left-Wing Extremist Scene". In Zúquete (2023b), pp. 277–291.
  - Zenn, Jacob. "Examining Equity, Extremism, and Left–Right Reciprocal Radicalization". In Zúquete (2023b), pp. 53–84.
  - Zúquete, José Pedro (2023c). "Left-Wing Extremism and the War on Civilization". In Zúquete (2023b), pp. 257–276.

=== Terrorism bibliography ===
- Chaliand, Gérard (2010). The History of Terrorism: From Antiquity to Al Qaeda (1st ed.). Berkeley, California: University of California Press. ISBN 978-0-520-24709-3 – via Internet Archive.
- Clark, Simon (2018). "Post-War Italian Politics: Stasis and Chaos". Terror Vanquished: The Italian Approach to Defeating Terrorism (E-book ed.). Arlington, Virginia: Center for Security Policy Studies. ISBN 978-1-732-94780-1. LCCN 2018955266 – via Google Books.
- Raufer, Xavier (October–December 1993). "The Red Brigades: A Farewell to Arms". Studies in Conflict and Terrorism. 16 (4). London, England: Routledge: 315–325. doi:10.1080/10576109308435937.
