= Radical Party =

Radical Party may refer to any of a number of political parties professing the progressive-liberal ideology known as Radicalism:

== Worldwide ==
- Nonviolent Radical Party Transnational and Transparty (1989–present)

== Europe ==
In the western Mediterranean European countries, Radicalism was one of the major political movements between 1848 and 1940. Such parties were often labelled 'Democratic', 'Radical democratic', or 'Radical liberal' parties:

- In France:
  - Radical Left (1902–1940), parliamentary group of the Independent Radicals
  - Radical-Socialist Party (France) (1901–present)
  - Radical Party of the Left (1971–present)
  - Radical Movement (2017–2021), former merger of the Radical Party and the Radical Party of the Left
- In Italy:
  - Italian Radical Party (1877–1925)
  - Radical Party (Italy) (1955–1989)
  - Italian Radicals (2001–present)
  - Radical Socialist Movement (2006–present), formed by dissidents members of the Radicals of the Left
  - Liberty and Equality (2010–present), formed by dissidents members of the Radicals of the Left
- In Spain, Radicalism took the form of various parties labelled 'democratic', 'progressive', 'radical' and 'republican':
  - the Progressive Party (1835–69), formed by former participants in the radical Revolution of 1820;
  - the Democratic Party (1849–69) a Spanish progressive party of Jacobin and 1848er inspiration, active in the 1850s.
  - the Federal Democratic Republican Party (1868–1910)
  - the Democratic Radical Party (1869–80), successor the Progressive Party. It was refounded in 1880, following splinters, as the Progressive Democratic Party (1880–1912)
  - the successor Democratic Party (1876–9) reformed as the Possibilist Democratic Party (1879–90)
  - The Radical-Republican Party (1908–40), a splinter of the Progressive Democratic Party;
  - Its splinter, the Radical-Socialist Republican Party (1928–34). This merged with others to form the Republican Left (1934–59)
  - A second splinter of the Radical-Republican Party formed the Republican Democratic Party and Republican Union (1934–59)

In the Dutch-speaking, German-speaking and Nordic countries, the English or French term Radical was represented by terms that literally translated as 'Free-Minded' (or, alternatively, as 'Freethinker' or 'Rationalist'), including:

- In Switzerland:
  - the original Radical Party (1830s–1894), see Regeneration (Switzerland)
  - the comparatively left-leaning successor party known as the Radical-Democratic Party (in French) and the Free-minded Democratic Party (German) (1878 to present)
  - the comparatively right-leaning successor party known as the Radical-Liberal Party (1893 to 2009), and its successor the FDP, whose name translates to the Free-minded and Liberal Party in German and the Radical and Liberal Party in French (2009–present)
- In Luxembourg:
  - the Liberal League (1904–28), although predominantly classical liberal rather than Radical, contained a left-wing faction of Radical ideology;
  - the Radical Socialist Party (1925–1932), founded by the splinter of the left wing of the old Liberal League;
  - the Radical Party (Luxembourg) (1928–1932), founded by the splinter of the right wing of the Radical Socialist Party.
  - the Radical Liberal Party (Luxembourg) (1932–1945), formed as a merger of the Radical Socialist Party and Radical Party
- In the Netherlands:
  - the Radical League (1892–1901)
  - the Free-minded Democratic League (1901-1946)
  - the Political Party of Radicals (1968–1991)
- In Germany, a succession of Radical parties existed:
  - The German Free-minded Party (1884 to 1893), which split into two successors:
  - the left-leaning Free-minded Union (1893 to 1910)
  - and the centre-leaning the Free-minded People's Party (1893 to 1910)
  - These merged as the Progressive People's Party (1910 to 1918)
  - This was reformed as the German Democratic Party (1918 to 1930).
- In Scandinavia:
  - In Denmark, the current Liberal Party began as a Radical Party, hence its name in Danish (Venstre, 'Left'). The Radical wing split off from the classical-liberal majority in 1905 to form a new party, known as Radikale Venstre (Radical Left).
  - In Sweden, the Free-minded National Association (1902 to 1934)
  - In Norway, the Free-minded Liberal Party (1909 to 1932) and Free-minded People's Party (1932 to 1935)
  - In Finland, the Young Finns (1905-1918), its successor the National Progressive Party (1919–51), and its successor the Free-minded League (1951 to 1965)

In south-eastern Europe, Radicalism was also a historically important political movement:

- In Bulgaria, the Radical Democratic Party (1902–present)
- In Greece
  - the Party of Radicals (1848-1864) of the United States of the Ionian Islands
  - the Venizelist splinter from the Liberal Party () and the Democratic Party ()
- In Romania (see list of historical political parties in Romania)
  - the Free and Independent Fraction (1864-1884)
  - the National Liberal Party (1875-1940)
  - the Radical Party (1884–19??), splinter of the former;
- In Serbia
  - the Serbian Progressive Party (1881-1919)
  - the People's Radical Party (1881–1926)
  - the Independent Radical Party (1903-1919), left-wing splinter of the former
  - the State Party of Serbian, Croatian and Slovene Democrats (1919-1946) and its splinter, the Republican and Democratic Party (1924-1946)
  - the Yugoslav Radical Union (1934–1941)
  - the Serbian Radical Party (1991–present)
- In Turkey, the Republican People's Party (1919-1980)

In Central and Eastern Europe, Radicalism was less potent but nonetheless prominent political force:

- In Czechoslovakia and its predecessor territories:
  - the Young Czech Party (1874-1918)
  - the Czech National Social Party (1897–present)
- In Russia and its historical territories:
  - Constitutional Democratic Party
  - Trudovik Party
- In Ukraine and its predecessor territories:
  - the Ruthenian-Ukrainian Radical Party (1890-1926)
  - the Radical Socialist Party of Ukraine (1926-1950)
  - Radical Party (Ukraine) (2010–present)

=== United Kingdom ===
- Radicals (UK) (17??–1859)

== South America ==
=== Argentina ===
- Radical Civic Union (1891–present)
- People's Radical Civic Union (1957–1972), led by Ricardo Balbín
- Intransigent Radical Civic Union (1957–1972)

=== Bolivia ===
- Radical Party (Bolivia) (1913–1943)

=== Chile ===
- Radical Party (Chile) (1863–1994)
- Social Democrat Radical Party (1994–present)

=== Ecuador ===
- Ecuadorian Radical Liberal Party (182?–present)
- Alfarista Radical Front (1972–present)

=== Paraguay ===
- Authentic Radical Liberal Party (1978–present)

== Asia ==
=== India ===
- Radical Democratic Party (India) (1940–1948)

=== Israel ===
- Meri-Israeli Radical Camp (1960s-1970s)

== Oceania ==
=== New Zealand ===
- Radical Party (New Zealand) (1896–19??)

== See also ==
- Radicalism (historical)
- Political radicalism
- National Radical Party (disambiguation)
- Italian Radicals (disambiguation)
- Free-minded Party (disambiguation)
