= Radical left =

Radical left may refer to:

== Political thought ==
- Radical left-wing politics or far-left politics
- The left part of radicalism, a political movement which shifted towards the centre during the 20th-century

== Political parties and movements ==
- In Cyprus
  - Committee for a Radical Left Rally (ERAS), a left-wing political party/organization
- In Denmark
  - The Danish Social Liberal Party (Danish: Radikale Venstre, literally "Radical Left", est. 1905), a social-liberal party
- In France
  - Radical Left (France), a liberal parliamentary group during the French Third Republic
  - Radical Party of the Left (Parti radical de gauche, PRG, est. 1972), a social-liberal party
  - The Radicals of the Left (Les Radicaux de gauche, LRDG), split of the PRG around MEP Virginie Rozière, est. 2017
- In Greece
  - Syriza or Coalition of the Radical Left (est. 2004), a left-wing political party
  - Radical Left Front (Μέτωπο Ριζοσπαστικής Αριστεράς, Metopo Rizospastikis Aristeras, MERA, 1999–2009), a former alliance of left-wing political parties

== See also ==
- Radical (disambiguation) § Politics
- Radical Party (disambiguation)
- Left Party (disambiguation)
- Antifa (disambiguation)
