= The Radicals of the Left =

The Radicals of the Left Les Radicaux de gauche
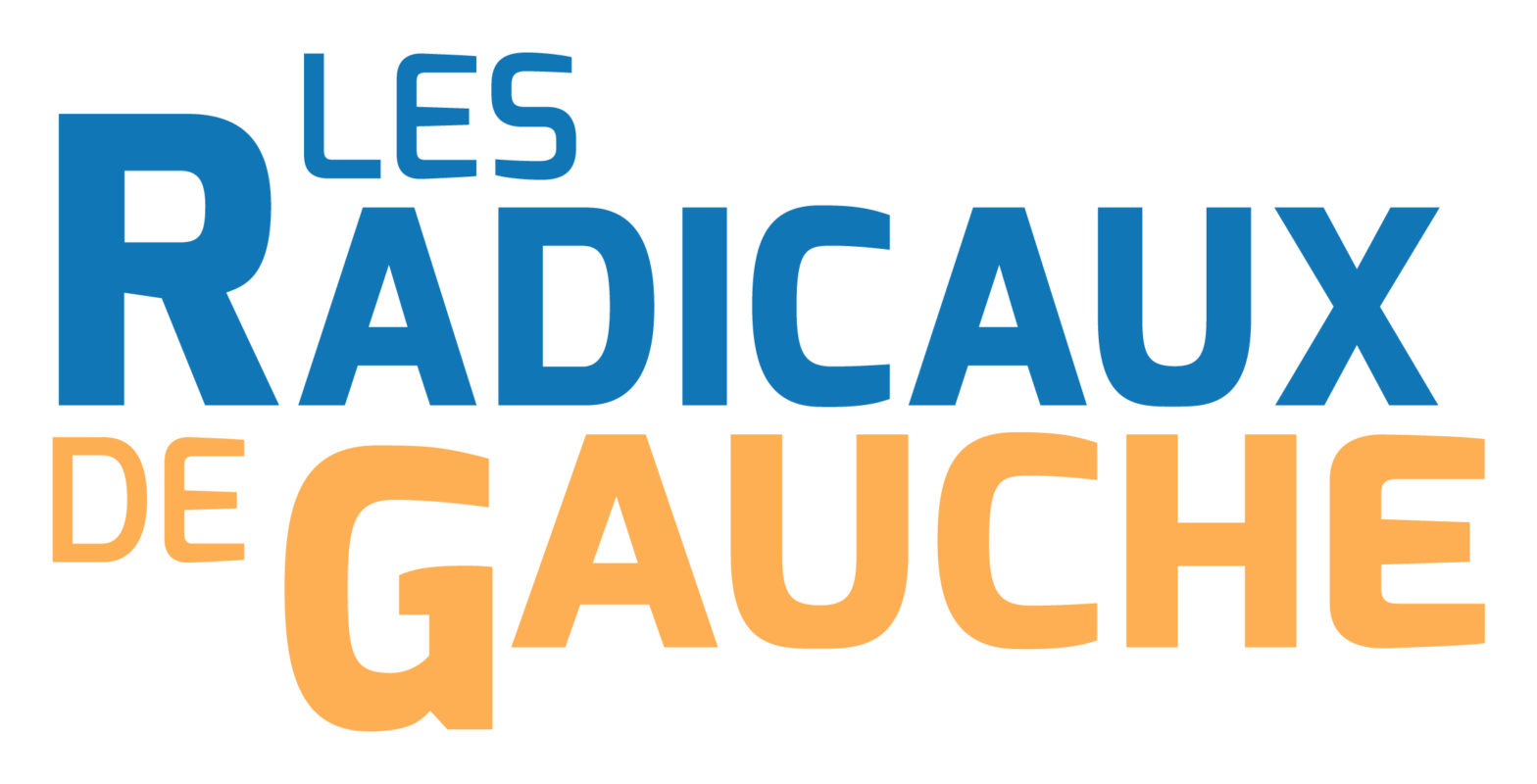
- Abbreviation: LRDG
- President: Isabelle Amaglio-Térisse; Stéphane Saint-André
- Founded: December 2017
- Split from: Radical Party of the Left
- Ideology: Social justice; Green politics; Pro-Europeanism; Secularism; Progressivism; Left-wing radicialism
- Political position: Left-wing
- National Assembly: 0 / 577
- Senate: 0 / 348
- Regional councils: 0 / 1,926
- Departmental councils: 2 / 4,046

Website
- www.lesradicauxdegauche-lrdg.fr

The Radicals of the Left (French: Les Radicaux de gauche, LRDG) is a French political party founded by progressive dissidents of the Radical Party of the Left (PRG), after the PRG agreed to merge with the French centre-right Radical Party (PRV), in 2017.

== History ==
=== Radical movement ===
In 2017, President of the PRG Sylvia Pinel and President of the PRV agreed to work closer to form a united radical movement. They committed to building a movement outside the Left–right political spectrum and apart from build a large independent radical party, independent of the Republicans and En Marche. At a joint congress, 86% of the parties' delegates voted to reunify the two parties after forty-five years of separation. The newly christened Radical Movement (MR) faced dissent from the more conservative and progressive wings of the two parties. On the left, a group led by Member of the European Parliament Virginie Rozière and former député Stéphane Saint-André along with multiple members of leadership in the party, signed a pledge called Pour que vivent les Radicaux de Gauche! (For the Radicals of the Left to live!). On Rozière's Facebook page she pointed out the political disagreements between the two parties.

After the formation of the Radical Movement, Rozière and Saint-André split from the PRG, and formed Les Radicaux de gauche (The Radicals of the Left). Rozière and Saint-André became Co-Presidents of the new party. They claimed to bring with them, "about fifty elected officials, activists and executives of the former PRG." They established multiple regional federations, including in Vaucluse and Finistère.

For the 2019 European Parliament election in France, the party was slated to join the Envie d'Europe list of the Socialist Party and Place Publique lead by Raphaël Glucksmann. Rozière was given the tenth place spot. Géraldine Guilpain, Stéphane Saint-André, Isabelle Amaglio-Térisse, Jean-Marc Dessaud and Jeanne Sotter were also meant to be on the list. However, at the request of the newly re-founded PRG, the LRDG were forced out of the list. The party did not join another list and Rozière lost her seat in the election.

In the 2020 municipal elections in Montpellier the Radicals under Rozière first supported the list of businessman and President of Montpellier Hérault Rugby, Mohed Altrad. However, they withdrew their support of the list over Altrad seeking the support of La République En Marche!. The party redirected their support towards the dissident ecologist list of Clothilde Ollier. Virginie Rozière was placed in fifth place. Their list won 7.25% in the municipal election and merged with Altrad's list. Rozière did not win a seat. Incumbent departmental councillor for Finistère, Thierry Biger did not run for re-election. Rozière chose not to run in Occitania, instead running in the Canton of Montpellier-3 with Serge Martin. The two came second to last with 609 votes.

Jérémy Matteucci and Léa Behr ran in the cantons of Metz-1 and Metz-2 respectively, neither winning. Isabelle Amaglio-Terrisse ran in the Canton of Sartrouville with Stéphane Baudement of The Ecologists, losing to the LR candidate with 32.41%.

Jean-Jacques Stoter was re-elected in the Canton of Ailly-sur-Somme with Catherine Benedini-Polleux. Marion Bonaïti was chosen to represent the party on the "Le Temps des cerises" list of La France Insoumise and other left-wing parties in Bourgogne-Franche-Comté. The list did not meet the minimum threshold of 10% to qualify for the second round.

The party also supported lists in Brittany, Centre-Val de Loire, Grand Est, Hauts-de-France and Normandy.

In the 2022 French legislative election, the party joined the Federation of the Republican Left, a political alliance of left-wing parties including the Republican and Socialist Left, Citizen and Republican Movement and L'Engagement, a political party formed by supporters of Arnaud Montebourg.

The party ran nine candidates in the election. No candidate made it past the first round.

Candidates
Constituency	Candidate	First Round Votes	References
Calvados (3rd)	Sylvie Sénécal	2	
Calvados (6th)	Anne-Lyse Mbelo	889	
Seine-et-Marne (4th)	Djamila Merzoud-Aissaoui	0	
Seine-Maritime (7th)	Lauriane Coufourier	721	
Seine-Maritime (9th)	Mickaël Baron	1,725	
Pas-de-Calais (9th)	Stéphane Saint-André	2,913	
Moselle (9th)	Yan Rutili	1,435	
Eure (4th)	Olivier Taconet	712	

The Radicals supported the united left candidacy of the New Popular Front and did not run any candidates.

The party supported and was present on many lists in the 2026 French municipal elections. Nine municipal councillors were elected. After Benoît Payan was elected Mayor of Marseille, Marseille city councillor and member of LRDG, Ahmed Heddadi was co-opted onto the Departmental Council of Bouches-du-Rhône.

== Elected representatives ==
=== Regional and Departmental Councillors ===
The party has two departmental councillors;

- Jean-Jacques Stoter (Somme)
- Ahmed Heddadi (Bouches-du-Rhône)

Before the 2021 French departmental and regional elections they had one regional councillor and two other departmental councillors;

- Virginie Rozière (Occitania)
- Thierry Biger (Finistère)
- Jean-Jacques Stoter (Somme)

=== Municipal councillors and mayors ===
After the 2026 French municipal elections, the LRDG has one mayor and nine municipal councillors.

==== Mayors ====
- Jean-Jacques Stoter (Briquemesnil-Floxicourt)

==== Municipal councillors ====
- Simon Riffault (Metz)
- Émilie Marchès (Mérignac)
- Hubert Morenvillez (Saint-Étienne)
- Isabelle Amaglio-Térisse (Sartrouville)
- Diego Ortega (Louviers)
- Philippe Broudeur (Quimper)
- Mickaël Baron (Sandouville)
- Danilson Lopès (Bezons)
- Ahmed Heddadi (Marseille) (Note: Also Deputy Mayor for Social ties, community life, social centres, old age and urban animation)

== Electoral results ==
National Assembly
Election year	Leader	1st round votes	%	2nd round votes	%	Seats	+/–
2022 (Note: Within Federation of the Republican Left)	Isabelle Amaglio-Térisse and Stéphane Saint-André	6,672	0.03%	N/A		0 / 577	New
2024	Isabelle Amaglio-Térisse and Stéphane Saint-André	Supported the New Popular Front					

== See Also ==
- Radical Party of the Left
- Classical radicalism
- Liberalism and radicalism in France
