= Radikal (disambiguation) =

Radikal was a Turkish newspaper.

Radikal may also refer to:

- Radikall (German magazine), a German anarchist magazine; see XS4ALL
- Radikal Records, an American record label
- Radikal Ungdom, a Danish political youth organization
- Radikall, a 2017 album by Iranian-born musician Shahin Najafi

== See also ==
- Radical (disambiguation)
