= Radical right =

Radical right may refer to:

- Radical right (Europe), a nationalist and populist tendency in European politics
- Radical right (United States), a strictly conservative and anti-socialist tendency in US politics
- Far-right politics, sometimes used interchangeably with "radical right"

== See also ==
- Radical center (disambiguation)
- Radical left (disambiguation)
