= Virginie Rozière =

French politician (born 1976)

Virginie Rozière MEP
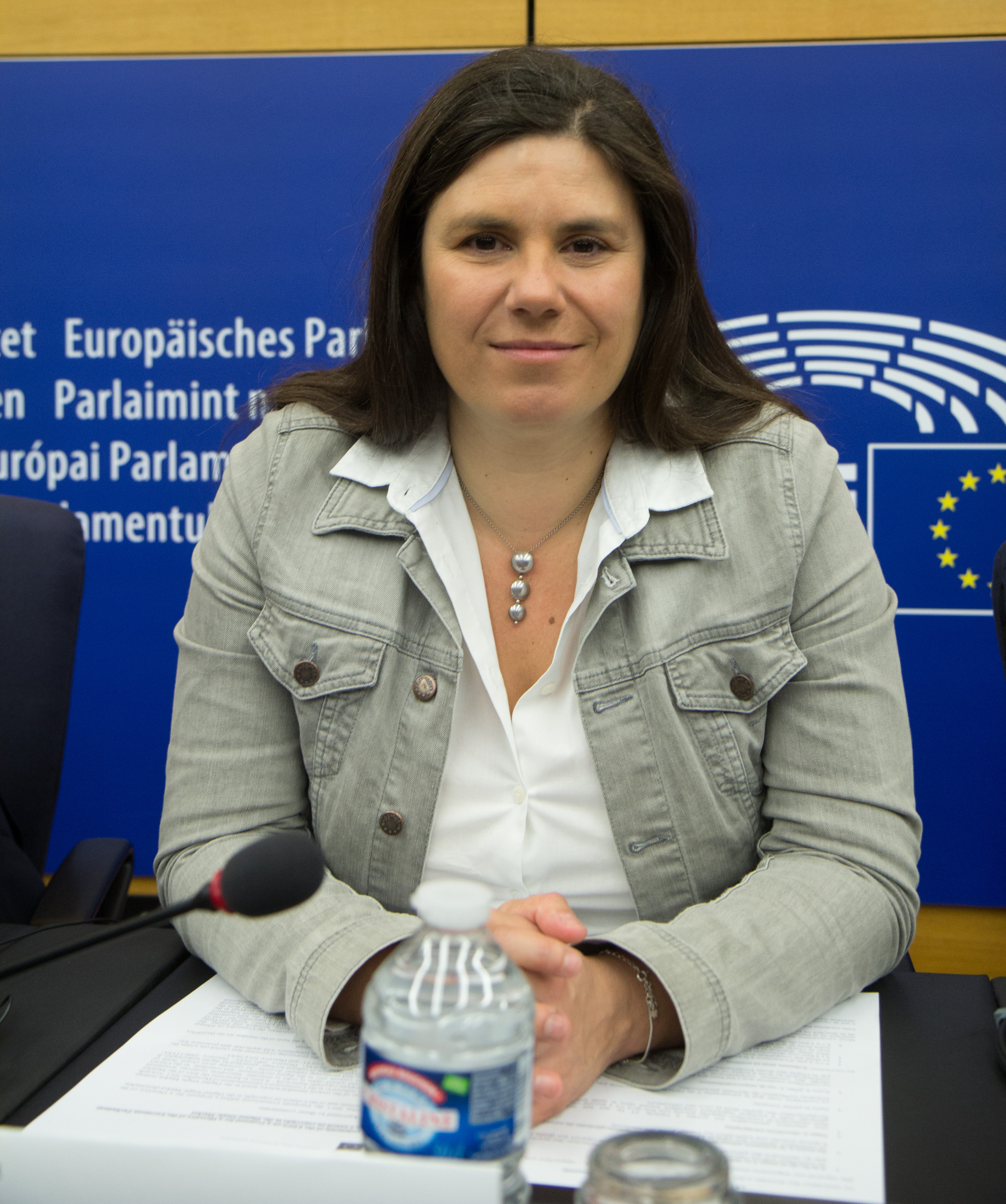

Member of the European Parliament
- In office 1 July 2014 – 1 July 2019
- Constituency: South-West France

Personal details
- Born: 18 June 1976 (age 50) Montpellier, France
- Party: French; The Radicals of the Left; EU; Progressive Alliance of Socialists and Democrats
- Education: École Polytechnique
- Website: www.virginieroziere.eu

Virginie Rozière (French pronunciation: [viʁʒini ʁozjɛʁ]; born 18 June 1976) is a French politician of the Radical Party of the Left (PRG) who served as a Member of the European Parliament (MEP) from 2014 until 2019.

== Early life and education ==
Born in Montpellier, Rozière graduated from École Polytechnique in 2000. She also has a third dan black belt in judo.

== Early career ==
After graduating, Rozière worked for the Ministry of Defence. From 2010 to 2012 she worked in the European Parliament, then returned to France and worked as Deputy Director in the Ministry for Crafts, Trade, and Tourism under Sylvia Pinel.

== Political career ==
In 2013, the Socialist Party (PS) and the PRG, led by Pinel, came to an agreement where members of the PRG could run under the PS banner in the upcoming 2014 parliamentary elections. In the elections in May 2014, Rozière won 15.73% of the vote in South-West France, and was elected to the European Parliament, the only PRG member to do so. In parliament, Rozière served on the Committee on the Internal Market and Consumer Protection and the Committee on Petitions, and is a member of the Progressive Alliance of Socialists and Democrats in the European Union. In this capacity, she served as rapporteur on legislation to protect whistleblowers in the aftermath of scandals such as LuxLeaks or the Panama Papers.

In December 2017, the PRG merged with the Radical Party to form the Radical Movement. Rozière and Stéphane Saint-André spoke in opposition to the merger, and instead chose to leave the PRG and form a new party, The Radicals of the Left (LRDG, the "Left Radicals"). Before the 2019 European Parliament election, LRDG at first found an agreement for a common candidacy with PS and Place Publique. However, shortly after the PRG cancelled the merger in March 2019, LRDG dropped from the candidate lists and Rozière did not stand for reelection, citing PRG influence on PS for the failure of the common candidacy.

== Political positions ==
In the Socialist Party's primaries, Rozière endorsed Sylvia Pinel as the party's candidate in the 2017 French presidential election.
