= National Radical Party =

The National Radical Party may refer to:

- National Radical Party (Greece)
- National Radical Party (Hungary)
- National Radical Party (Serbia)
- National Radical Party (Yugoslavia)

== See also ==
- National Radical Camp (Poland)
