= Radical egalitarianism =

Radical egalitarianism is a political theory associated with the ideas of optimistic tendencies, the suggestions that Americans must work in a multiracial society and that citizens must use activism to achieve the ultimate goal of satisfactory conditions for the entire population.

== See also ==
- Classless society
- Communism
- Egalitarianism
- Equality of outcome

== Bibliography ==
- Dawson, Michael C. Black. Visions: The Roots of Contemporary African-American Political Ideologies. 1st ed. Chicago. The University of Chicago Press. 2001. Print.
