= Free-minded Party =

Free-minded Party (from German: Freisinn, Dutch: Vrijzinnigheid, Finnish: vapaamielinen and Swedish: Frisinne) may refer to one of several defunct liberal parties:

- German Free-minded Party, a political party in Germany from 1884 to 1893
- Free-minded Union, a successor party to the German Free-minded Party from 1893 to 1910
- Free-minded People's Party, a successor party to the German Free-minded Party from 1893 to 1910
- Free-minded Democratic Party (German name), a political party in Switzerland from 1894 to 2009
  - The abbreviation FDP is still used by their successor FDP.The Liberals, a political party in Switzerland from 2009
- Free-minded Democratic League, a political party in the Netherlands from 1901 to 1946
- Free-minded National Association, a political party in Sweden from 1902 to 1934
- Free-minded Liberal Party (Free-minded People's Party from 1932), a political party in Norway from 1909 to 1945
- Swedish Free-minded Party, a political party in Finland from 1947 to 1951
- Free-minded League, a political party in Finland from 1951 to 1965
- Freeminded Co-operation, a political party on the Åland Islands from 1967 to 2011
