= Radical center =

Radical center may refer to:

- Radical centrism, a political movement
- Power center (geometry), or radical centre
