= Radical politics =

Intent to transform or replace the fundamental principles of society

Radical politics denotes the intent to transform or replace the fundamental principles of a society or political system, often through social change, structural change, revolution or radical reform. The process of adopting radical views is termed radicalisation.

The word radical derives from the Latin radix ("root") and Late Latin radicalis ("of or pertaining to the root, radical"). Historically, political use of the term referred exclusively to a form of progressive electoral reformism, known as classical radicalism, that had developed in Europe during the 18th and 19th centuries. However, the denotation has changed since its 18th century coinage to comprehend the entire political spectrum, though retaining the connotation of "change at the root".

== History ==
The Oxford English Dictionary traces usage of 'radical' in a political context to 1783. The Encyclopædia Britannica records the first political usage of 'radical' as ascribed to Charles James Fox, a British Whig Party parliamentarian who in 1797 proposed a 'radical reform' of the electoral system to provide universal manhood suffrage, thereby idiomatically establishing the term 'Radicals' as a label denoting supporters of the reformation of British Parliament.

Throughout the 19th century, the concept of radical politics broadened into a variety of political notions and doctrines. Party politics in England began to favour moderate positions, marginalising other movements into more politically aggressive factions. As open advocacy of republicanism was illegal in France following the Napoleonic Wars, Radicals emerged under similar reformist ideals as their British counterparts, though they later branched out to form the Radical-Socialist movement with a focus on proletarian solidarity. With the rise of Marxism, the notion of radical politics shifted away from reformism and became more associated with revolutionary politics. In United States politics, the term is used pejoratively among conservatives and moderates to denote political extremism, with the 19th-century Cyclopaedia of Political Science describing it as "characterized less by its principles than by the manner of their application".

During the 20th century, radical politicians took power in many countries across the world. Such radical leaders included Vladimir Lenin and Joseph Stalin in Russia, Mao Zedong in China, Ruhollah Khomeini in Iran, Adolf Hitler in Germany, as well as more mainstream radicals such as Ronald Reagan in the United States and Margaret Thatcher in the United Kingdom.

== Positions ==
=== Status quo change ===
The common feature to all radical political forms is a view that some fundamental change is required of the status quo. For an array of anti-capitalist forms, this manifests in anti-establishment reactions to modern neoliberal regimes.

=== Concept of ideology ===
The Stanford Encyclopedia of Philosophy describes the radical concept of ideology to be that:

- While social conditions exist "that are vulnerable to criticism and protest; ideology exists to protect these social conditions from attack by those who are disadvantaged by them."
- "Ideology conserves by camouflaging flawed social conditions, giving an illusory account of their rationale or function, in order to legitimate and win acceptance of them."

This view reflects "a consensus among radicals of all stripes on the role of law as a dissembling force to safeguard the unjust relations of the status quo." This radical critique of ideology is especially prominent within post-leftism. In addressing specific issues, some radical politics may completely forgo any overarching ideological plan.

=== Difference from extremism ===
Astrid Bötticher identifies several differences between radicalism and extremism, among them in goals (idealistic vs. restorative, emancipatory vs. anti-democratic), morals (particular vs. universal), approach towards diversity (acceptance vs. disdain), and use of violence (pragmatic and selective vs. legitimate and acceptable).

== See also ==
- Anarchism
- Communism
- Populism
- Radical centrism
- Radical feminism
- Radical left (disambiguation)
- Radical right (disambiguation)
- Reactionary
- Revolutionary
- Rules for Radicals
