= 1898 German federal election =

- 16 June 1898

All 397 seats in the Reichstag 199 seats needed for a majority
- Registered: 11,441,054 (▲7.65%)
- Turnout: 68.06% (▼4.41pp)
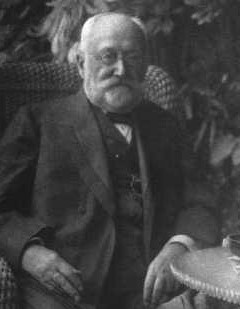

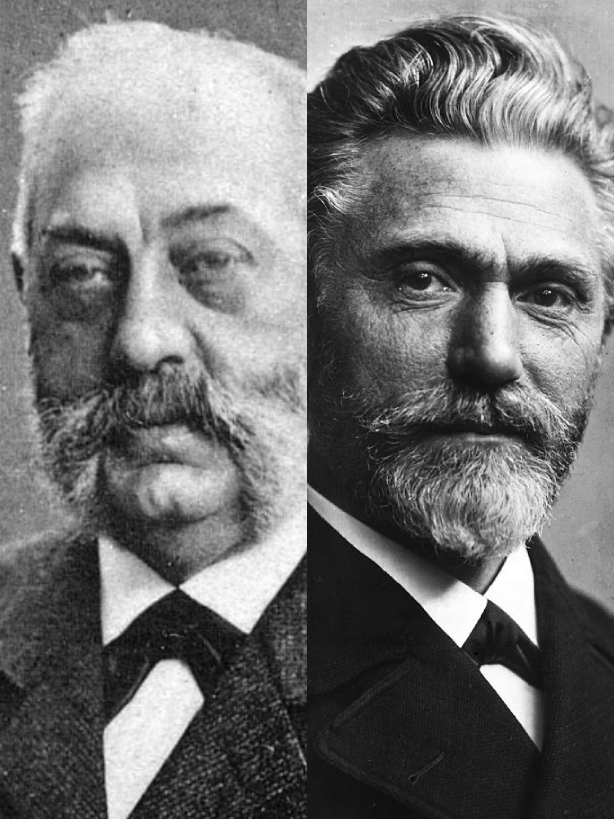

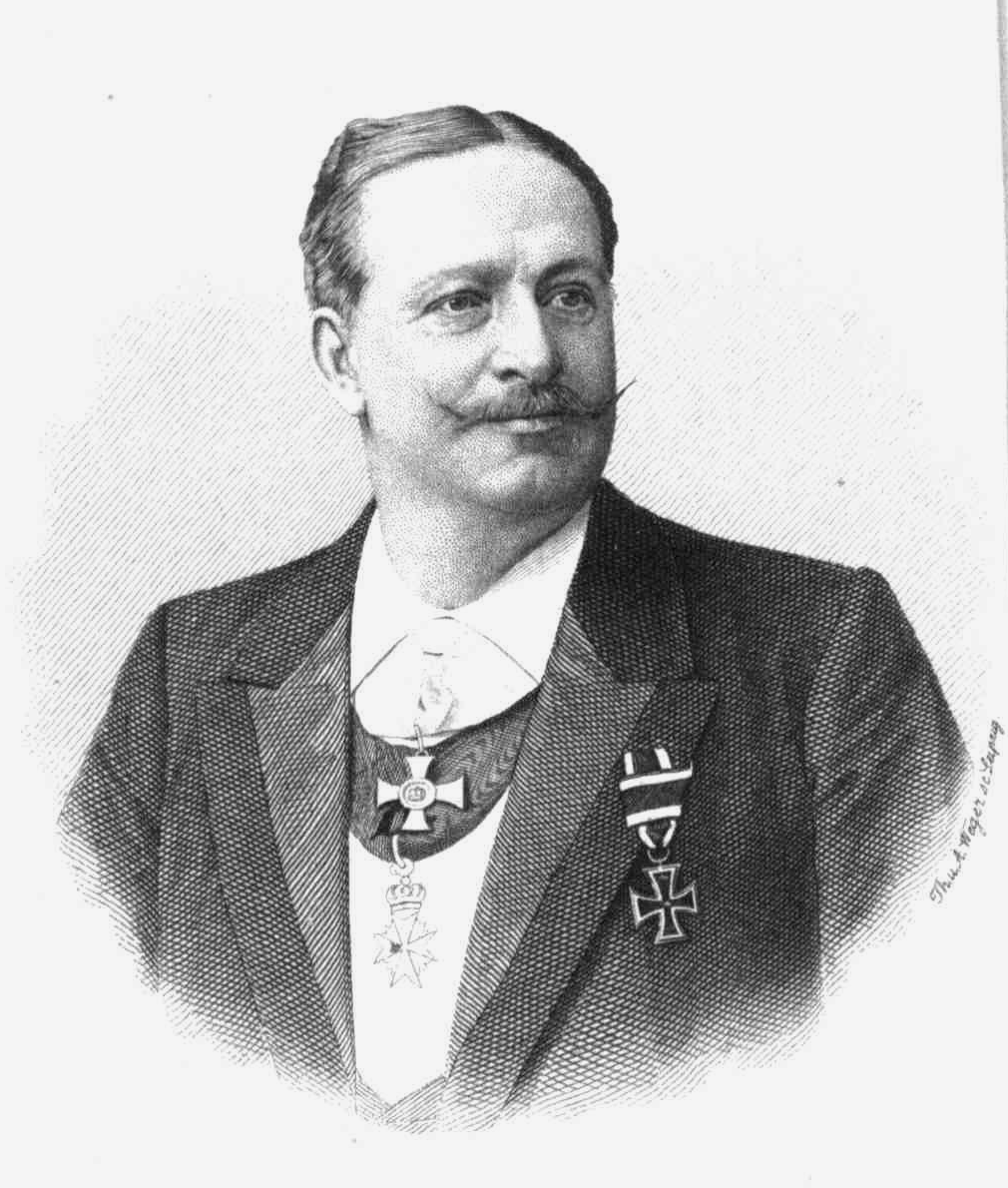

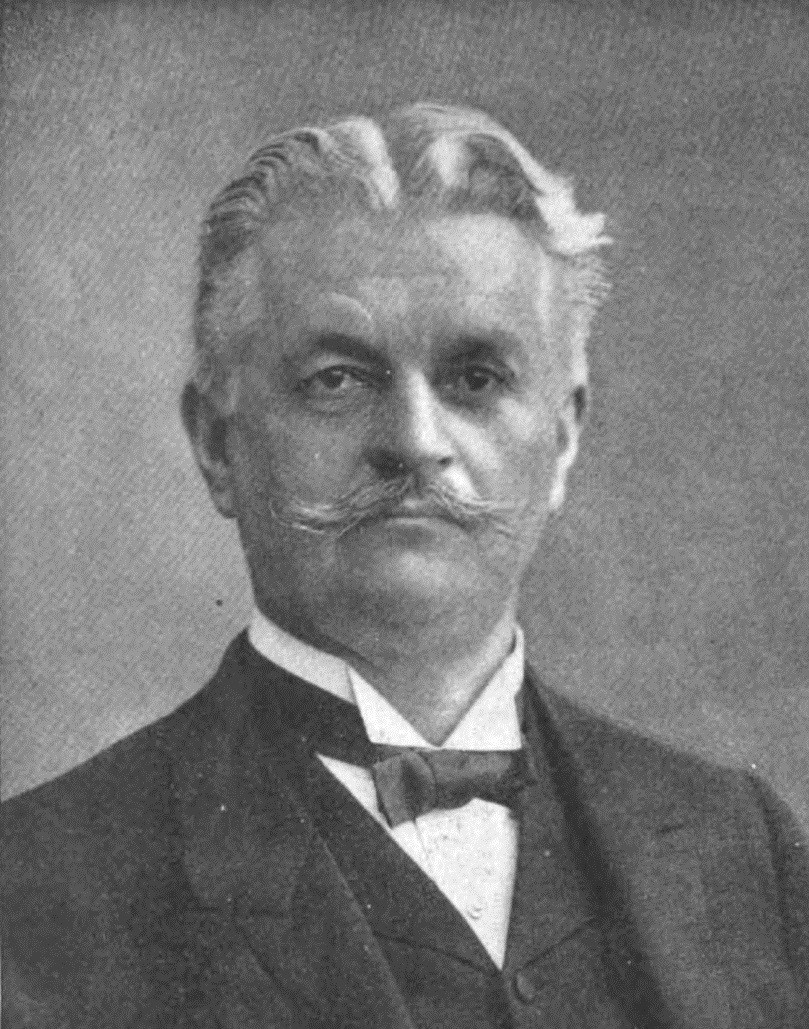

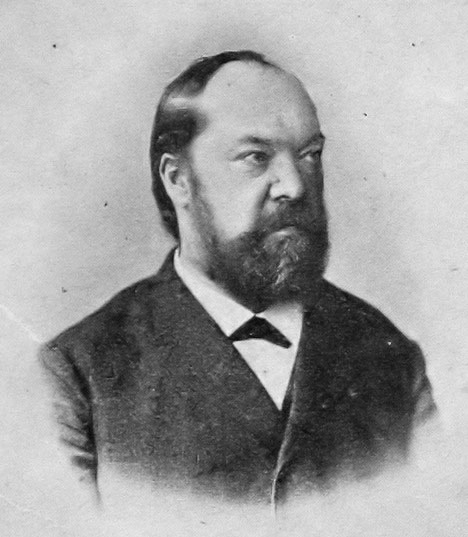
	First party	Second party	Third party
Leader	Franz von Ballestrem	Paul Singer & August Bebel	Otto von Manteuffel
Party	Centre	SPD	DKP
Last election	19.14%, 96 seats	23.28%, 44 seats	12.93%, 69 seats
Seats won	102	56	53
Seat change	▲6	▲12	▼16
Popular vote	1,454,042	2,107,076	830,341
Percentage	18.76%	27.18%	10.71%
Swing	▼0.38 pp	▲3.90 pp	▼2.22 pp
	Fourth party	Fifth party	Sixth party
			DRP
Leader	Ernst Bassermann	Eugen Richter
Party	NLP	FVP	DRP
Last election	12.29%, 51 seats	8.67%, 24 seats	5.71%, 28 seats
Seats won	48	29	22
Seat change	▼3	▲5	▼6
Popular vote	997,147	558,314	337,601
Percentage	12.86%	7.20%	4.35%
Swing	▼0.57 pp	▼1.47 pp	▼1.36 pp
- Map of results (by constituencies)
President of the Reichstag before election
Rudolf von Buol-Berenberg
Centre
President of the Reichstag after election
Franz von Ballestrem
Centre

A federal election for the tenth Reichstag of the German Empire was held on 16 June 1898. It was a regularly scheduled election and came at the end of the first Reichstag to complete a five-year term after the 1888 constitutional change that lengthened the sitting period to five years. Unlike the previous election, which was dominated by conflicts over a military appropriations bill, no single issue stood out in 1898. The chancellor at the time of the election was Chlodwig zu Hohenlohe-Schillingsfürst, an independent.

The Social Democratic Party (SPD) received the most votes with 27.2%, but the Centre Party remained the largest party in the Reichstag with 102 of the 397 seats, whilst the SPD won just 56. Voter turnout was 68%, the lowest since 1884.

== Electoral system ==
The election was held under general, equal, direct and secret suffrage. All German males over the age of 25 years were able to vote except for active members of the military and recipients of poor relief. The restrictions on the military were meant to keep it from becoming politicized, while men on relief were considered to be open to political manipulation. The constitutional guarantee of a secret vote was not safeguarded at the time, since ballot boxes and polling booths were not introduced until 1903.

If no candidate in a district won an absolute majority of the votes, a runoff election was held between the first- and second-place finishers. It was possible for a replacement candidate to be introduced in a runoff.

Since at least the 1893 election, the distribution of seats following an election was affected by the fact that Germany had not redistricted since 1871, when each district had had about 100,000 voters. The intervening years had seen considerable rural to urban migration due to industrialisation. Parties such as the Social Democrats that had predominantly urban electorates suffered disproportionately because each vote in a heavily populated urban district carried less weight than a vote in rural areas that had lost inhabitants.

== Results ==
Graph of the party split among 397 seats.
Party	Votes	%	+/–	Seats	+/–
Social Democratic Party	2,107,076	27.18	+3.90	56	+12
Centre Party	1,454,042	18.76	−0.38	102	+6
National Liberal Party	997,147	12.86	+0.57	48	−3
German Conservative Party	830,341	10.71	−2.22	53	−16
Free-minded People's Party	558,314	7.20	−1.47	29	+5
German Reich Party	337,601	4.35	−1.36	22	−6
Social Reform Party	215,891	2.78	−0.51	10	−6
Free-minded Union	195,682	2.52	−0.87	12	−1
Independent Polish	169,037	2.18	−0.07	8	−6
Bavarian Peasants' League	130,724	1.69	+1.13	4	+2
Alsace-Lorraine parties	118,072	1.52	−0.25	11	+2
German People's Party	106,396	1.37	−0.80	8	−3
German-Hanoverian Party	105,161	1.36	+0.03	9	+2
German Agrarian League	103,489	1.33	New	6	New
Christian Social Party	48,914	0.63	−0.61	1	−1
Polish Court Party	67,424	0.87	+0.17	6	+1
Independent liberals	46,731	0.60	−0.13	3	+1
Independent conservatives	28,846	0.37	−0.10	3	+1
National-Social Group	27,208	0.35	New	0	New
Independent anti-semites	22,989	0.30	+0.15	2	+2
Alsatian liberals	16,887	0.22	+0.14	1	0
Danish Party	15,439	0.20	+0.01	1	0
Other agrarians	9,019	0.12	−0.22	1	0
Lithuanian Party	8,142	0.11	+0.06	1	+1
Polish People's Party	7,667	0.10	New	0	New
Other conservatives	4,473	0.06	−0.19	0	−1
Middle Class parties	3,162	0.04	New	0	New
Alsace Liberal Group	2,132	0.03	New	0	New
Others	14,075	0.18	0.00	0	0
Unknown	612	0.01	+0.01	0	0
Total	7,752,693	100.00	–	397	0
Valid votes	7,752,693	99.56			
Invalid/blank votes	34,021	0.44			
Total votes	7,786,714	100.00			
Registered voters/turnout	11,441,054	68.06			
Source: Wahlen in Deutschland

=== Alsace-Lorraine ===
Party	Votes	%	+/–	Seats	+/–
Alsace-Lorraine Land Party	67,171	29.34	New	6	New
Social Democratic Party	51,990	22.71	+3.41	1	−1
Lorraine independent conservatives	25,658	11.21	+7.07	3	+2
Alsatian Liberals	16,887	7.38	+4.68	1	0
Clericals	14,125	6.17	−30.93	1	−5
Independent conservatives	13,483	5.89	+0.16	1	0
German Reich Party	9,381	4.10	−1.96	1	0
Alsace-Lorraine protesters	6,237	2.72	−1.86	1	0
Alsatian autonomists	4,881	2.13	−2.76	0	0
National Liberal Party	8,144	3.56	+0.90	0	0
Independent liberals	6,900	3.01	+1.29	0	0
Alsace Liberal Group	2,132	0.93	New	0	New
German Social Party	860	0.38	−1.04	0	0
Free-minded Union	321	0.14	New	0	New
Others	743	0.32	+0.18	0	0
Total	228,913	100.00	–	15	0
Valid votes	228,913	97.95			
Invalid/blank votes	4,783	2.05			
Total votes	233,696	100.00			
Registered voters/turnout	233,696	100.00			
Source: Wahlen in Deutschland
