= Hermann Ahlwardt =

German journalist (1846–1914)

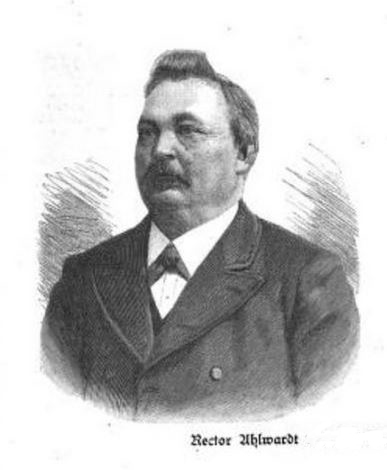
- Occupations: Teacher, opinion writer

Hermann Ahlwardt (21 December 1846 – 16 April 1914) was a German teacher, writer, politician, member of the Reichstag (German parliament) and a vehement antisemite.

== Life ==
Hermann Ahlwardt worked as a primary school teacher in Neuruppin and, from 1869, in Berlin. In 1870/71, he participated in the Franco-Prussian War. After the war, in 1881, he initially became headmaster of a Berlin primary school.

After stealing money collected for a children's Christmas party in 1889, Ahlwardt was fired from his job as a primary school principal. He blamed his financial difficulties on Jewish money-lenders and wrote a book claiming the German government was in the pay of the Jewish banker, Gerson von Bleichröder. He was jailed for four months when it came to light that he had forged the documents he used to support the claim.

In 1892, Ahlwardt accused arms manufacturer Ludwig Loewe & Co. of being in a Jewish-French conspiracy to sell defective rifles to the German army in order to weaken the country militarily and was sentenced to five months' imprisonment for this unfounded defamation but was not jailed because by this time he had been elected to the Reichstag. He had run in a by-election for a very rural Brandenberg district seat. World agriculture prices were depressed at the time and he had told this farming community that their troubles were due to the Jews.

In the Reichstag he described Jews as "predators" and "cholera bacilli" that should be exterminated. The popularity of Ahlwardt and another antisemite Reichstag deputy, Otto Böckel, in conservative rural electorates prompted the German Conservative Party to add an antisemitic plank to their 1892 Tivoli Congress platform.

Ahlwardt's violent rhetoric alienated even other antisemitic politicians. In 1895, Ahlwardt was expelled from the German Social Reform Party and, with Otto Böckel, founded the Antisemitic People's Party (Antisemitische Volkspartei). He lost his seat in the 1903 Reichstag election and withdrew from politics. He visited the United States and on returning to Germany began campaigning against Freemasonry. He was imprisoned again in 1909, this time for blackmail, and in 1914 Ahlwardt died in a traffic accident in Leipzig at the age of 67.

During his visit to the United States, he went to New York and made a speech against Jews. A popular story told by the newspaper The New York Times in 1940 has it that when he asked for police protection, the police that were assigned to guard him were all Jews. This is supposedly contradicted by news articles of the time that show the names of officers printed during his 1895 visit are not generally used by Jews, such as Cartright and O'Brien. Theodore Roosevelt, police commissioner at the time, confirmed in his autobiography that he deliberately assigned Jewish police to protect Ahlwardt, in order to ridicule him. In addition, there have been multiple Jewish families with the last name "O'Brien" and "Cartright".

== Selected works ==
- The desperate struggle of the Aryan peoples with Judaism, 3 vols., 1890
  - Part 2: The oath of a Jew
  - Part 3: Jewish tactics, at the same time answer to Mr. Ludwig Jacobowski
- Der Gipfel juedischer Frechheit - Das Gesetz ist todt - Es lebe Bleichroeder, 1891
- The processes Manché and Bleichröder, 1892
- The Jews and the Germans. A supplement to the Jews, 1892
- The Great Prophet. A reminder and parting word to my anti-Semitic friends, 1892
- The Jewish question. Lecture, 1892
- Ottering, 1892
- My arrest, 1892
- As the Jew does, Lecture, 1892
- The Treaty of Germany, 1913
- Truths about a German mine in Bohemia. Rudolfstädter Erzbergbau-Gewerkschaft in České Budějovice. A reality novel of a modern kind with the usual accompaniments of suicide, madness and despair, 1913
- More light! The assassination of Friedrich Schiller, Lessing and Mozart before the Forum of Modern Literary and World History, 1914
- More light! The Order of Jesus in His True Form and in His Relations with Freemasonry and Judaism, 1919
- Mehr Licht - Der Orden Jesu in seiner wahren Gestalt 1925 (published posthumously)
