= Oswald Zimmermann =

German politician

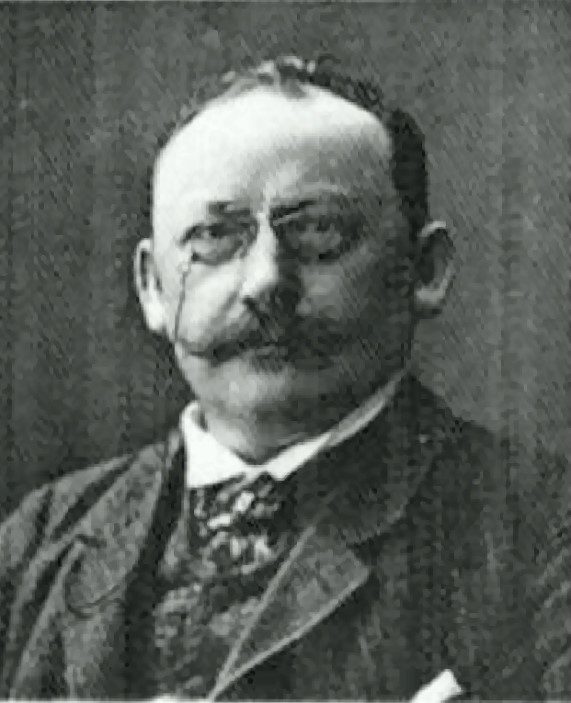
- Zimmermann in 1907
- Born: Oswald Franz Alexander Zimmermann; 5 February 1859; Neumarkt, Prussia
- Died: 5 October 1910 (aged 51); Dresden, German Empire
- Occupations: Journalist, politician
- Notable work: Sind die Juden noch das auserwählte Volk? Ein Beitrag zur Aufklärung über die Judenfrage

Oswald Franz Alexander Zimmermann (5 February 1859, Neumarkt – 5 October 1910, Dresden) was a German antisemitic politician and journalist. One of the leading representatives of political antisemitism in the German Empire, he was elected a member of the Reichstag three times.

Zimmermann, a Roman Catholic, was educated at the gymnasium in Ohlau before studying at Breslau University and Leipzig University. Working in Dresden, he was editor-in-chief of the journal Deutsche Reform before later establishing his own journal Deutsche Wacht. He also published Sind die Juden noch das auserwählte Volk? Ein Beitrag zur Aufklärung über die Judenfrage.

Zimmermann was active in the original German Reform Party, a strong antisemitic group active in Saxony between 1880 and 1891. When this party disappeared he developed his own group of followers and with them worked closely with Otto Böckel, with both men combining their followings as a new German Reform Party in 1893. He was elected to the Reichstag as one of a number of independent antisemites in 1890 and held the seat for the German Reform Party in 1893. Zimmermann pressed for closer links with another antisemitic party, the German Social Party, and, despite the reservations of Böckel, they merged in 1894 as the German Social Reform Party.

Despite the initiative being largely his idea Zimmermann found working with the German Social Party, who represented the more moderate end of the independent antisemitic movement, difficult and in particular clashed with their leader Max Liebermann von Sonnenberg, whom he personally disliked. Both men came to command their own factions within the party and, with Böckel having already left, the joint party proved highly unstable. The two groups split again in 1900 with Zimmermann reactivating the German Reform Party for a third time. He returned to the Reichstag representing this party in the 1907 election, holding the seat until his death in 1910.
