= Otto Böckel =

German politician (1859–1923)

Member of the Reichstag
- In office 1887–1903
- Constituency: Marburg

Member of the Reichstag
- In office 1907–1909

Personal details
- Born: July 2, 1859 Free City of Frankfurt
- Died: September 17, 1923 (aged 64) Michendorf
- Party: Independent (1887–1890); Antisemitische Volkspartei (1890–1903); German Reform Party (1893–1894); Independent Antisemites (1907–1909)
- Education: University of Marburg; University of Giessen; Heidelberg University; Leipzig University
- Occupation: Politician, librarian, folklorist

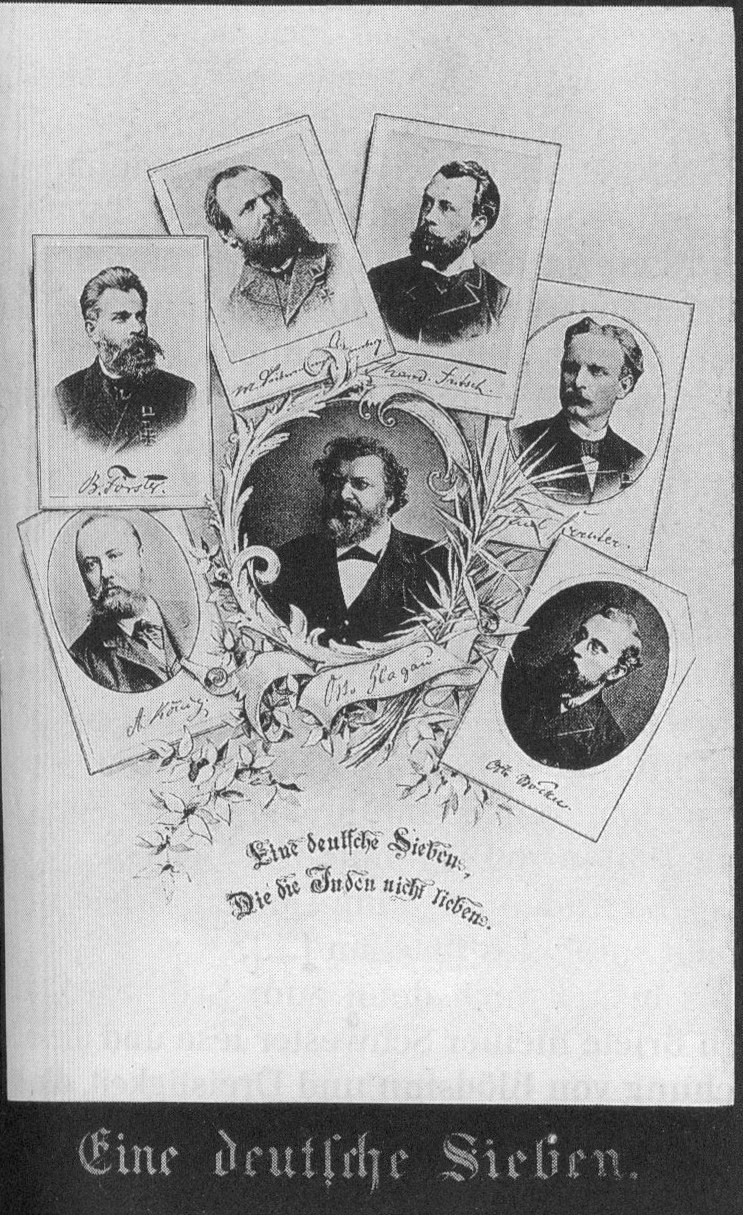
Böckel (bottom right) and other contemporary antisemites

Otto Böckel (2 July 1859, Free City of Frankfurt – 17 September 1923, Michendorf) was a German populist politician who became one of the first to successfully exploit antisemitism as a political issue in the country.

== Path to politics ==
A native of the Free City of Frankfurt and a librarian by profession, he initially studied law at the University of Marburg but dropped it for Volkskunde and became a noted folklorist. He obtained his doctorate in 1882, having also studied at the University of Giessen, Heidelberg University and Leipzig University, with time also spent studying languages.

Böckel witnessed the economic hardship of small farmers in the Grand Duchy of Hesse and the Prussian province of Hesse-Nassau. This had several causes, such as falling agrarian prices due to international competition, backward production methods, uneconomic division of farmland and the rural depopulation because of industrialization. However, Böckel concluded that the real cause behind this were Jewish merchants and profiteers who had a strong position in the trade with farmers in Hesse. In 1887 he published a pamphlet, Die Juden - die Könige unserer Zeit (The Jews - the kings of our times), in which he attacked the Jews for their perceived dominance over German life. He presented a populist appeal to the peasantry, which along with his natural charisma and good looks, made him very popular and saw him dubbed the "Hessian peasant-king" by his supporters.

In the election that same year he became the first independent antisemite to be elected to the Reichstag. Böckel was elected to the Reichstag on a platform of both antisemitism and support for the establishment of peasant co-operatives. A disciple of Wilhelm Heinrich Riehl, he shared his faith in the common man against the higher echelons of society. His slogan was Gegen Junker und Juden (Against Barons and Jews), indicating his nature as an opponent of both the Jews and the big landowners. His election in Marburg, secured at the expense of a sitting German Conservative Party member, meant that he would be the youngest member of the body and helped to secure him the nickname of the 'peasant king'. Böckel also published his own newspaper, Reichsherold, which was anti-clerical, anti-capitalist and advocated some radical democratic ideals as well as being highly antisemitic. He sometimes wrote under the name Dr. Capistrano, in tribute to Saint John of Capistrano, who was known as the "Scourge of the Jews".

== Political activity ==
Initially an independent at the start of the 1890s he formed his own group, the Antisemitische Volkspartei. This party ran in alliance with the Deutschsoziale Partei of Max Liebermann von Sonnenberg in the 1890 election, with the new alliance capturing five seats of which four were held by Böckel's party. As well as his political movement, Böckel also organised the Mitteldeutscher Bauernverein, an antisemitic agrarian movement that counted as many as 15,000 members involved co-operative and banking schemes that purposefully sought to exclude Jews. His various movements provided an early entry to politics for later figures such as Heinrich Class. The youngest member of the Reichstag, he continued his populist appeals, holding mass torch-lit rallies of his followers, a technique later favoured by the Nazi Party.

In 1893 the Antisemitische Volkspartei merged with Oswald Zimmermann's followers under the name German Reform Party.

== Decline ==
However the Tivoli Congress killed off Böckel's political influence as the German Conservative Party adopted antisemitism and he rejected overtures from Theodor Fritsch to become part of a wider antisemitic coalition as he disliked Fritsch personally. Böckel was replaced as leader of the independent antisemites in 1894 by Otto Hirschel and Philipp Köhler and his influence declined. Meanwhile, his agrarian group, hamstrung somewhat by Böckel's own lack of money was, much to his dismay, largely swallowed up by the Junker-controlled Agrarian League. He was attacked by conservative antisemites such as Adolf Stoecker for a supposed lack of commitment, with a comment Böckel made that "the money-greedy capitalist, never mind whether Jew or non-Jew, is the destroying angel of our people" used by his critics to claim that he had abandoned antisemitism for socialism.

He lost his seat in the 1903 election but returned in 1907 when the independent antisemites had an unexpected growth in support. However he had grown disillusioned with the democratic process, whilst his reputation had been damaged by fathering an illegitimate child, and he left politics in 1909. Having become reconciled to the more traditional right he occasionally spoke for the Conservatives and the Agrarian League but a failed attempt to return to the Reichstag in 1912 was to be his last political activity. He retired to Michendorf in Brandenburg and faded into obscurity, dying in poverty.
