= Economic Union (political party) =

The Economic Union (German: Wirtschaftliche Vereinigung) was a parliamentary group in the German Empire's Reichstag, gathering deputies of several minor antisemitic and agrarian parties.

Its component parties were the antisemitic German Social and Christian Social parties as well as the German Agrarian League and the Bavarian Peasants' League. Moreover it included some nonpartisan representatives who were direct members of the Economic Union.

The group's initial leader was Max Liebermann von Sonnenberg.

== History ==
The group first formed after the 1903 federal election, comprising twelve lawmakers. After the national elections in 1907 reached its peak, returning 19 members of the Reichstag (14 delegates of the component parties in addition to five nonpartisan direct members of the Economic Union). The 1912 elections saw it reduce in strength to eight seats.

Following World War I it merged into the German People's Party.

== Ideology ==
The party represented conservative members of the middle class. It supported agrarian and social legislation.
