= 1912 German federal election =

- 12 January 1912

All 397 seats in the Reichstag 199 seats needed for a majority
- Registered: 14,442,387 (▲8.16%)
- Turnout: 84.89% (▲0.24pp)
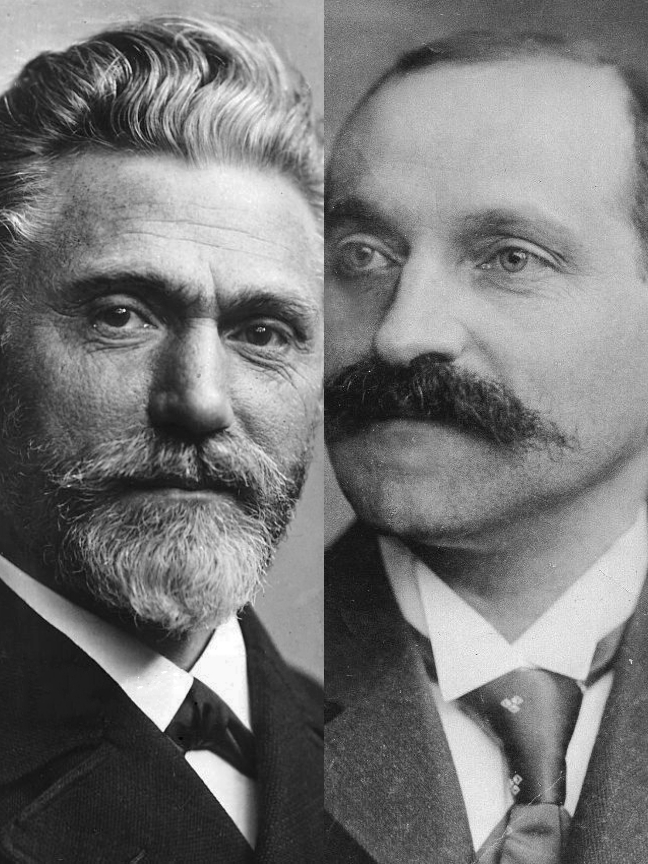

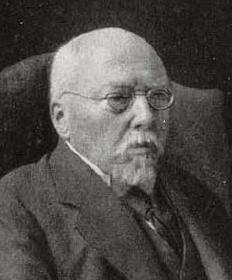

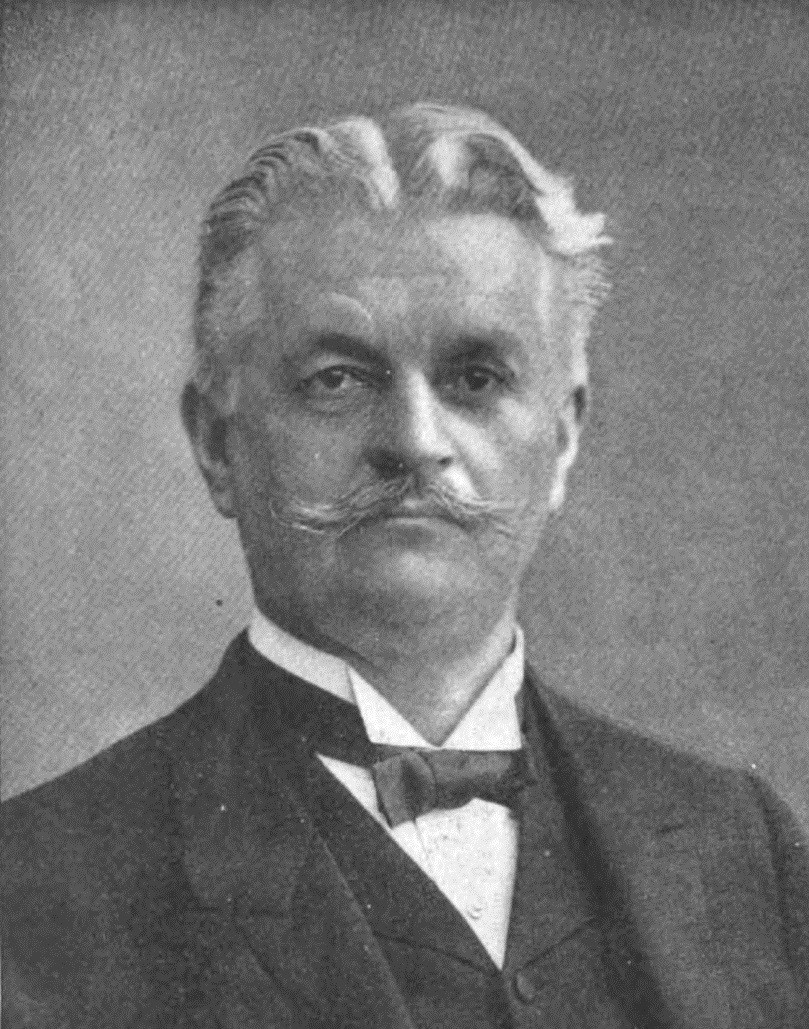

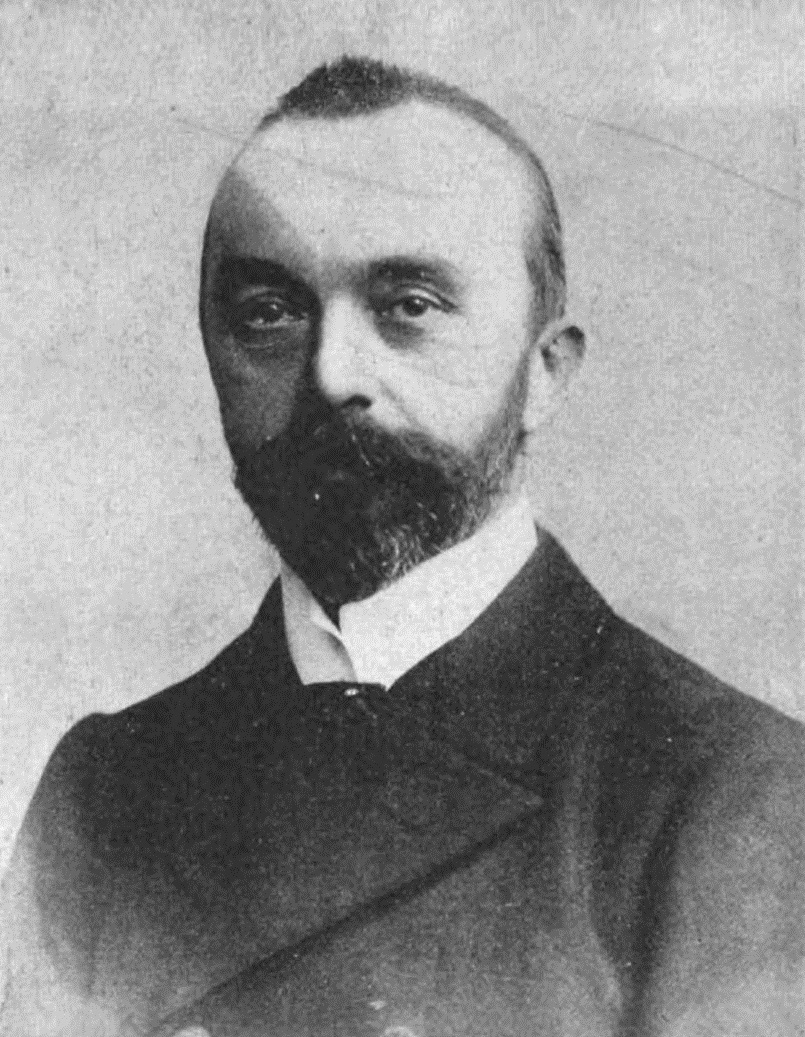

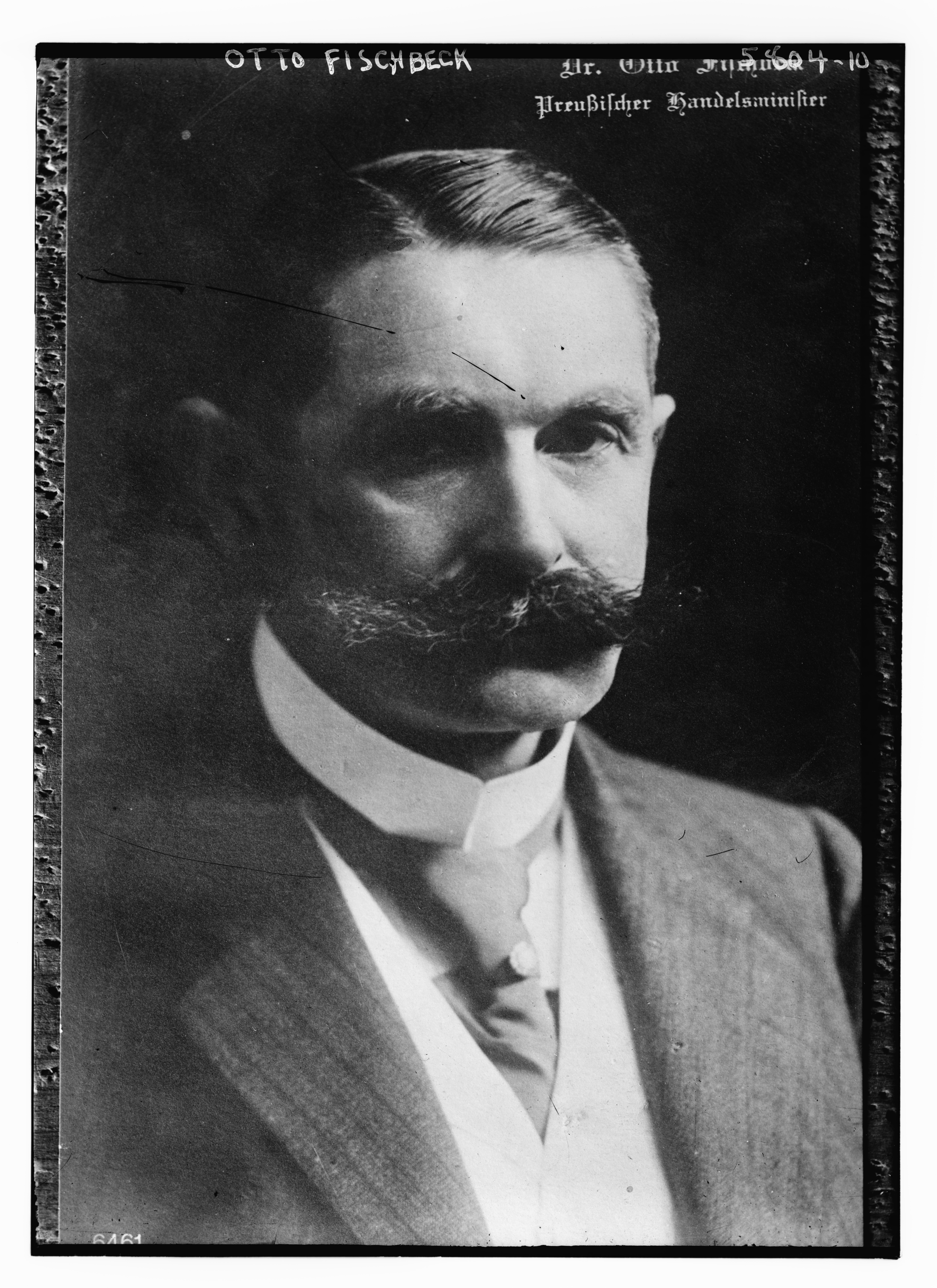

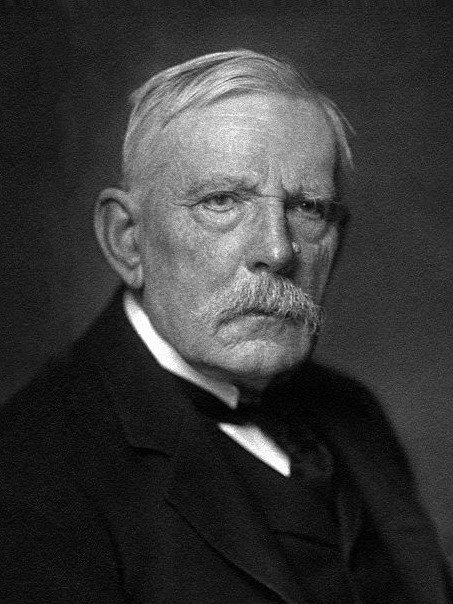
	First party	Second party	Third party
Leader	August Bebel & Hugo Haase	Georg von Hertling	Ernst Bassermann
Party	SPD	Centre	NLP
Last election	28.94%, 43 seats	18.79%, 101 seats	14.80%, 56 seats
Seats won	110	90	45
Seat change	▲67	▼11	▼11
Popular vote	4,250,400	1,988,504	1,662,700
Percentage	34.82%	16.29%	13.53%
Swing	▲5.88 pp	▼2.50 pp	▼1.27 pp
	Fourth party	Fifth party	Sixth party
Leader	Ernst von Heydebrand	Otto Fischbeck	Ferdynand Radziwiłł
Party	DKP	FVp	PP
Last election	9.41%, 59 seats	10.66%, 50 seats (Note: Combined results of the parties that merged to form the Progressive People's Party; Free-minded People's Party (6.55%, 29 seats), Free-minded Union (3.01%, 14 seats) and the German People's Party (1.10%, 7 seats))	4.03%, 20 seats
Seats won	41	41	18
Seat change	▼18	▼9	▼2
Popular vote	1,006,570	1,448,097	441,744
Percentage	8.25%	11.86%	3.62%
Swing	▼1.16 pp	▲1.20 pp	▼0.41 pp
- Results by constituency
President of the Reichstag before election
Hans Graf von Schwerin-Löwitz
DKP
President of the Reichstag after election
Johannes Kaempf
FVp

Federal elections were held in Germany on 12 January 1912. Although the Social Democratic Party (SPD) had received the most votes in every election since 1890, it had never won the most seats, and in the 1907 elections, it had won fewer than half the seats won by the Centre Party despite receiving over a million more votes. However, the 1912 elections saw the SPD retain its position as the most voted-for party and become the largest party in the Reichstag, winning 110 of the 397 seats. The election was also notable in producing a progressive legislative majority in the Reichstag.

Parties hostile or ambivalent to the ruling elites of the German Empire – the Social Democrats, the Centre Party, and the left-liberal Progressives – together won a majority of the seats. This allowed a successful censure vote against the government of Theobald von Bethmann Hollweg over the Saverne Affair in 1913 and the passage of the Reichstag Peace Resolution of 1917. However, the Centre and the Progressives were unwilling to act consistently in opposition, which left the government largely free to do as it wished.

Some historians, such as Fritz Fischer, have theorized that the First World War was partly a result of the strategy of the conservative Prussian Junkers to deal with the result. In an attempt to increase support for conservative parties and policies and to distract the population from the SPD, they hoped to drum up patriotism in an external conflict with Russia or another Eastern European state such as Serbia.

Georges Weill, an SPD candidate who won a seat in Metz, defected to France at the start of World War I.

== Electoral system ==
The members of the Reichstag were elected in single-member constituencies via the two-round system. There was no requirement that constituencies had to be of equal sizes population sizes, meaning that rural constituencies, which tended to have smaller populations, were overrepresented.

Since 1869, suffrage was available to all residents who:

- were male,
- were at least 25 years old,
- were nationals of one of the states,
- were resident in one of the constituencies,
- were not active soldiers,
- were not convicts,
- did not live on poverty relief,
- were not incapacitated.

Since 1888, a constitutional amendment required elections to be held every five years.

== Results ==
Party	Votes	%	+/–	Seats	+/–
Social Democratic Party	4,250,399	34.82	+5.88	110	+67
Centre Party	1,988,504	16.29	−2.50	90	−11
National Liberal Party	1,651,115	13.53	−1.27	45	−11
Progressive People's Party	1,448,097	11.86	+1.20	41	−9
German Conservative Party	1,006,570	8.25	−1.16	41	−18
German Reich Party	396,948	3.25	−0.94	14	−10
Independent Polish	246,275	2.02	−0.11	10	0
Agrarian League	165,034	1.35	+0.18	5	−2
Alsace-Lorraine parties	148,202	1.21	−0.11	9	−2
Christian Social Party	104,219	0.85	+0.33	3	0
Polish Catholic Party	93,629	0.77	+0.33	4	+1
German-Hanoverian Party	90,168	0.74	−0.08	5	+3
Polish People's Party	81,140	0.66	−0.13	3	−1
Independent conservatives	74,323	0.61	+0.18	4	+4
German Social Party	73,169	0.60	−0.18	3	−5
ELD	60,886	0.50	New	1	New
German Reform Party	60,758	0.50	−0.52	3	−3
Independent liberals	53,939	0.44	−0.32	0	−3
Bavarian Peasants' League	48,219	0.39	+0.02	2	+2
Peasants' League	41,352	0.34	New	2	New
Democratic Union	29,444	0.24	New	0	New
Middle Class parties	27,095	0.22	−0.44	0	−2
Polish Court Party	20,700	0.17	−0.18	1	−1
Danish Party	17,289	0.14	0.00	1	0
Lorraine Land Party	7,039	0.06	−0.14	0	0
Lithuanian Party	6,227	0.05	+0.01	0	0
Independent anti-semites	1,604	0.01	−0.13	0	0
Other conservatives	1,081	0.01	−0.03	0	0
Other agrarians	4,027	0.03	−0.24	0	−1
Others	9,492	0.08	+0.01	0	0
Unknown	688	0.01	0.00	0	0
Total	12,207,632	100.00	–	397	0
Valid votes	12,207,632	99.57			
Invalid/blank votes	53,099	0.43			
Total votes	12,260,731	100.00			
Registered voters/turnout	14,442,387	84.89			
Source: Wahlen in Deutschland

=== Alsace-Lorraine ===
Party	Votes	%	+/–	Seats	+/–
Social Democratic Party	110,695	31.75	+8.00	5	+3
Alsace-Lorraine Center Party	96,646	27.72	+0.75	7	0
ELD	60,886	17.46	New	1	New
Independent Lorraine Party	36,336	10.42	−3.70	2	−1
Alsace-Lorraine protesters	15,220	4.37	+2.08	0	−1
Centre Party	13,715	3.93	−8.69	0	−1
German Reich Party	7,373	2.11	+0.65	0	−1
Lorraine Land Party	7,039	2.02	−4.47	0	0
Others	744	0.21		0	0
Total	348,654	100.00	–	15	0
Valid votes	348,654	98.36			
Invalid/blank votes	5,807	1.64			
Total votes	354,461	100.00			
Registered voters/turnout	417,701	84.86			
Source: Wahlen in Deutschland
