= German Social Reform Party =

German Social Reform Party Deutschsoziale Reformpartei
- Founded: 1894
- Dissolved: 1900
- Merger of: German Reform Party; German Social Party
- Ideology: Völkisch nationalism; Antisemitism; Conservatism (German); Monarchism (German)
- Political position: Far-right
- Religion: Christianity

The German Social Reform Party (German: Deutschsoziale Reformpartei or DSRP) was a German Empire antisemitic political party active from 1894 to 1900. It was a merger between the German Reform Party (DRP) and the German Social Party (DSP).

== Formation ==
In the early 1890s political antisemitism in Germany was represented by both the DRP (led by Otto Böckel and Oswald Zimmermann) and DSP of Max Liebermann von Sonnenberg, with the latter being closer to mainstream conservative politics than the more radical DRP. Both parties had minor representation in the Reichstag, where they co-operated. When a merger was suggested the main impetus within the DRP came from Zimmermann, with Böckel in favour of maintaining separate existences. Ultimately however the merger was concluded in 1894 and Böckel, who had lost his Reichstag seat the previous year, left politics. A conference in Eisenach proclaimed the merger and the formation of the new party.

== Antisemitism ==
Antisemitism was the main basis of the party's ideology, uniting at times disparate elements of the group. They were active in 1898 in support of campaigns to restrict the immigration of Russian Jews into Germany and argued that such laws could form the basis of their ultimate aim of removing rights from all Jews in Germany. The party sought close links with the German National Association of Commercial Employees, a white-collar worker union that had a strong antisemitic current to its thinking. The DSRP adopted a strong Christian identity to its antisemitism and amongst those to sit for the party in the Reichstag was Karl Iskraut, a Protestant clergyman. It also sought to build up links with the Sittlichkeitsverein, a loose confederation of "morality leagues" that campaigned against prostitution and in favour of censorship, and whose support was also courted by the German Conservative Party and the Centre Party.

Wilhelm Giese emerged as a prominent member of the group and was especially noted for his criticism of Zionism, an idea that had some support among contemporary antisemites as a possible solution to the "Jewish problem". In 1899 he ensured that the party adopted the Hamburg Resolutions explicitly rejecting removing the Jews to a new homeland and instead called for an international initiative to handle the Jews by means of complete separation and (in case of "self-defence") final destruction (Vernichtung) of the Jewish nation". The programme helped to lay the foundations for the future Final Solution, a term it used.

== Political agenda ==
For a time the party organ was Antisemitische-Correspondenz after Liebermann von Sonnenberg had acquired the rights to the paper from Theodor Fritsch. However Liebermann von Sonnenberg's innate conservatism saw the language of the previously radical journal toned down and as a result subscription rates dropped. This conservatism made them targets for the left and in 1898 they were criticised in the pages of Sächsische Arbeiter-Zeitung, a Dresden-based left-wing newspaper edited by Rosa Luxemburg, for their support for monarchism and their veneration of Otto von Bismarck as well as for their internal squabbling. The DSRP responded by branding Luxemburg a "Jewish madam" in their Deutsche Wacht organ, and her reply to this attack has subsequently been included in anthologies of her writing.

A populist trend also existed locally within the party. In Hamburg the local branch sought to challenge the Social Democratic Party by campaigning for improved housing, education and trade union rights, as well as antisemitism. Rhetoric condemning capitalism and the upper classes was also a regular feature of the party's appeal. Its 1895 programme called for the reorganisation of the labour force on a national basis as well as an extensive reformation of the legal system aimed at "displacing the capitalist excesses of the present laws". In 1895 they added a call for compulsory guild membership for all craftsmen to their party programme.

== Decline ==
Due to its nature as a merger between an essentially conservative party and a radical one the DNSP was riven by splits and personality conflicts throughout its existence. Liebermann von Sonnenberg clashed in particular with Zimmermann, with both men commanding factions within the party.

As a united party the DSRP contested only the 1898 federal election and, although they gained thirteen seats in the Reichstag, this was a drop of three from the total antisemitic seats at the previous election. Their appeals to working class voters were unsuccessful but they also failed to win significant support from the middle classes, resulting in a decreased vote share. The party also struggled to get the access to publicity enjoyed by the more mainstream forces of the right, some of whom had come to co-opt elements of antisemitism into their own programmes, thus denting the DSRP's chances.

The party split entirely in 1900 with the DSP re-established. The reconstituted party was able to maintain its presence in the Reichstag until the fall of the empire. The remnants of the group would subsequently be absorbed into the German National People's Party in 1918. Zimmermann would also revive the DRP name and it too continued to be represented in the Reichstag until the end of the empire.
