= 1893 German federal election =

- 15 June 1893

All 397 seats in the Reichstag 199 seats needed for a majority
- Registered: 10,628,292 ▲4.76%
- Turnout: 7,702,265 (72.47%) ▲0.89pp
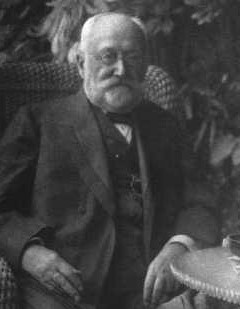

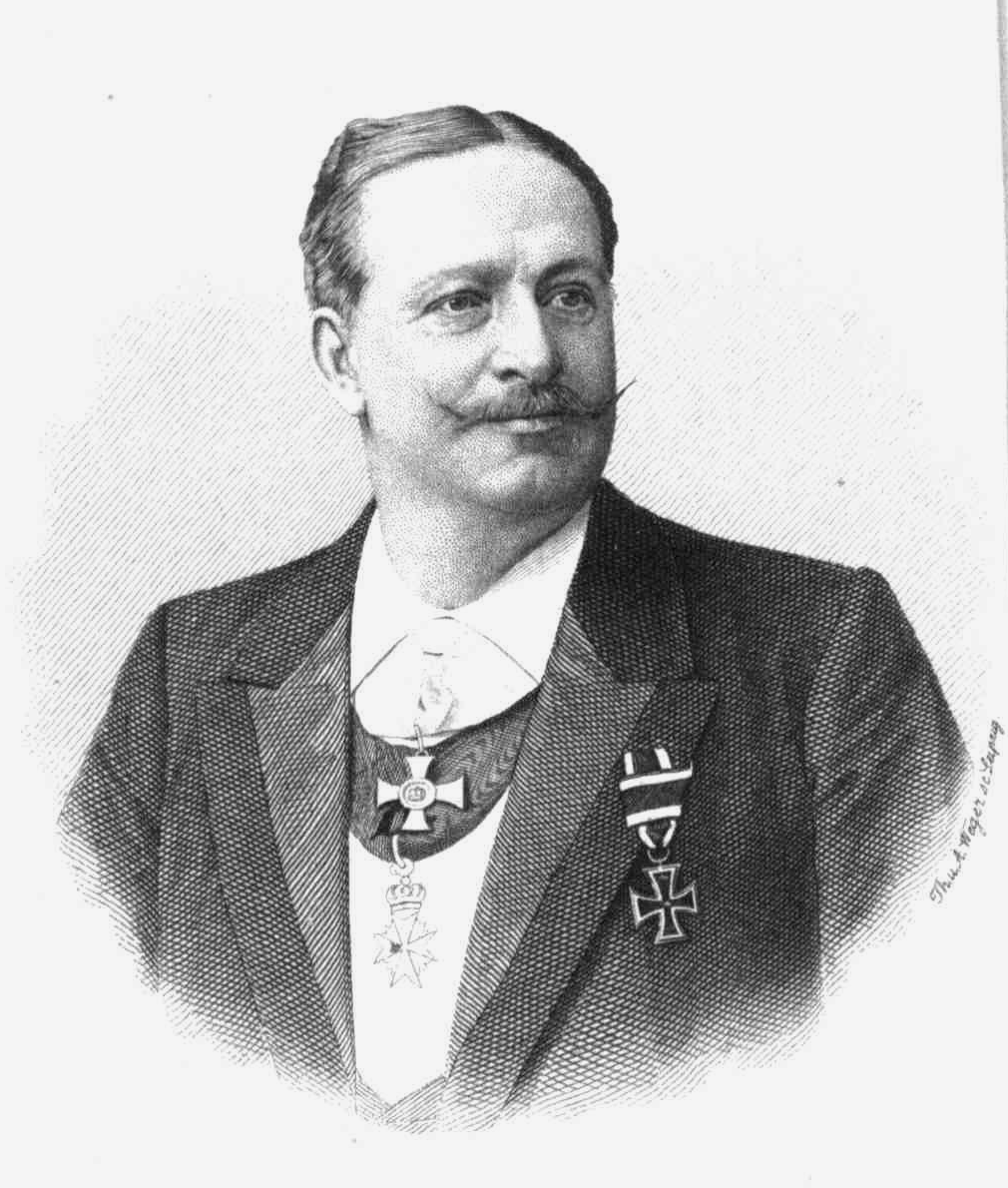

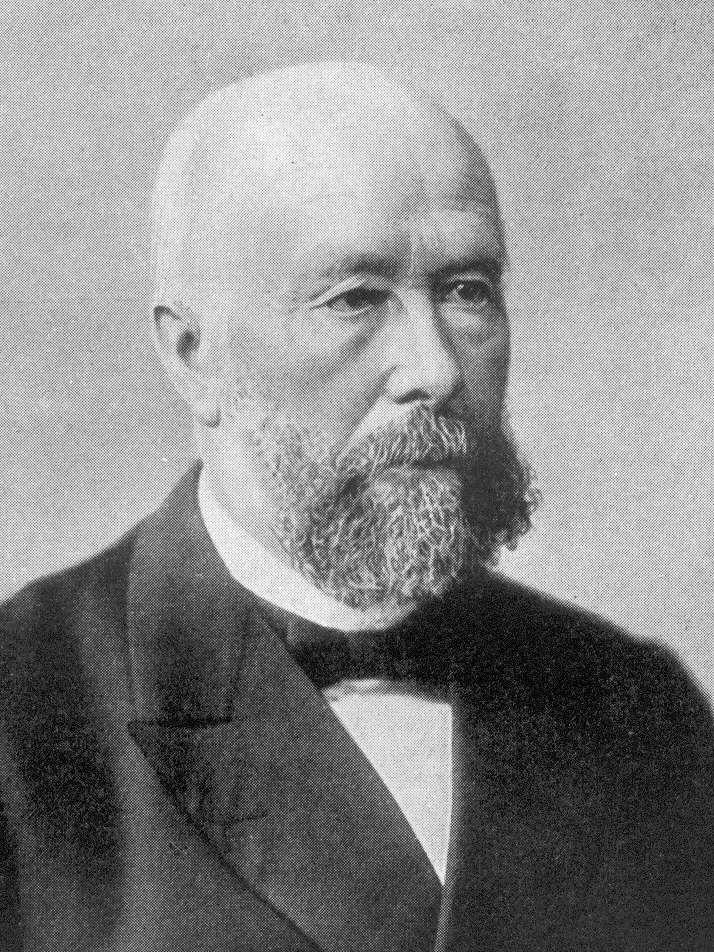

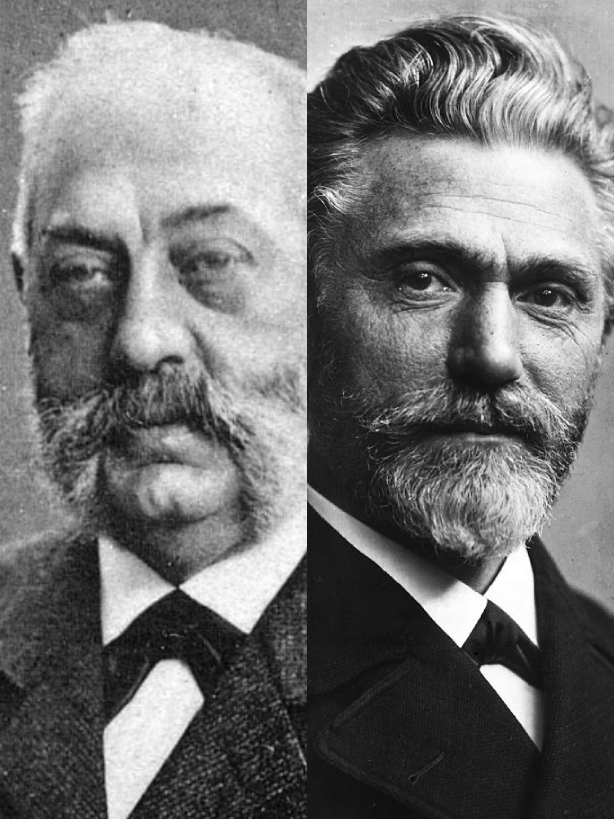

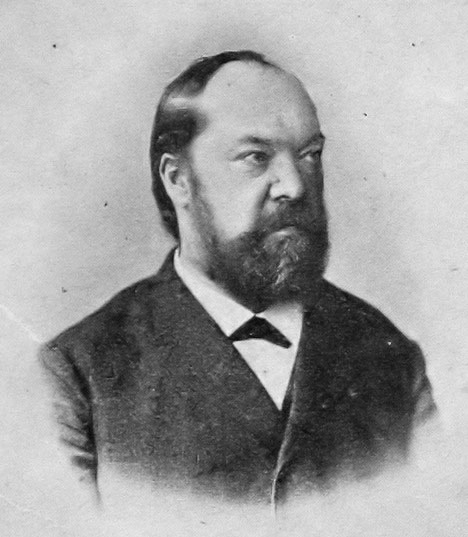
	First party	Second party	Third party
Leader	Franz von Ballestrem	Otto von Manteuffel	Rudolf von Bennigsen
Party	Centre	DKP	NLP
Leader since	1890	1892	1867
Last election	18.55%, 107 seats	12.21%, 71 seats	15.64%, 38 seats
Seats won	96	69	51
Seat change	▼11	▼2	▲13
Popular vote	1,468,501	992,412	942,410
Percentage	19.14%	12.93%	12.29%
Swing	▲0.59 pp	▲0.72 pp	▼3.35 pp
	Fourth party	Fifth party	Sixth party
		DRP
Leader	Paul Singer & August Bebel		Eugen Richter
Party	SPD	DRP	FVP
Leader since	18 March 1890 & 21 November 1892		7 May 1893
Last election	19.75%, 35 seats	6.38%, 19 seats	15.89%, 67 seats
Seats won	44	28	24
Seat change	▲9	▲9	▼43
Popular vote	1,786,738	437,972	665,427
Percentage	23.28%	5.71%	8.67%
Swing	▲3.53 pp	▼0.67 pp	▼7.22 pp
- Results by constituency
President of the Reichstag before election
Albert von Levetzow
DKP
President of the Reichstag after election
Albert von Levetzow
DKP

A federal election for the ninth Reichstag of the German Empire was held on 15 June 1893. It was an early election called by Chancellor Leo von Caprivi after he lost a vote on a military appropriations bill and dissolved the Reichstag elected in 1890.

The pro-government parties won a narrow victory in the election. The Centre Party remained the largest party with 96 of the 397 seats, followed by the German Conservative Party and the National Liberal Party. The Social Democratic Party won the most votes at 23% but came in fourth in the number of seats due to the fact that Germany had not redrawn its electoral district boundaries to reflect population changes since 1871.

Voter turnout was 72.5%.

== Background ==
The election was scheduled after the Reichstag was dissolved on 6 May 1893 at the request of Chancellor Leo von Caprivi. As with the 1887 dissolution, the cause was a military appropriations bill proposed by the government. Caprivi had wanted to increase the size of the army to around 500,000 men, but the Reichstag rejected the proposal. The Social Democrats, a majority of the Centre Party and part of the German Free-minded Party voted against it. As a result of the vote, the Free-minded Party split into the Free-minded People's Party (those who had opposed Caprivi) and the Free-minded Union (his supporters) prior to the election.

== Electoral system ==
The election was held under general, equal, direct and secret suffrage. All German males over the age of 25 years were able to vote except for active members of the military and recipients of poor relief. The restrictions on the military were meant to keep it from becoming politicized, while men on relief were considered to be open to political manipulation. The constitutional guarantee of a secret vote was not safeguarded at the time, since ballot boxes and polling booths were not introduced until 1903.

If no candidate in a district won an absolute majority of the votes, a runoff election was held between the first- and second-place finishers. It was possible for a replacement candidate to be introduced in a runoff.

By 1893 the distribution of seats following an election was being affected by the fact that Germany had not redistricted since 1871, when each district had had about 100,000 voters. The intervening years had seen considerable rural to urban migration due to industrialisation. Parties such as the Social Democrats that had predominantly urban electorates suffered disproportionately because each vote in a heavily populated urban district carried less weight than a vote in rural areas that had lost inhabitants.

== Results ==
The election resulted in a narrow victory for the pro-government Cartel parties (German Conservatives, German Reich Party (Free Conservatives) and National Liberals), which together picked up 20 seats. The Free-minded Union (Caprivi's supporters) won 13 seats while the Free-minded People's Party lost 43.

The Social Democratic Party also made gains following the expiration of the Anti-Socialist Laws in 1890. The parties that included antisemitism as a significant part of their party programs – the German Social Party, German Reform Party and Christian Social Party – won seats primarily in the Prussian Province of Hesse-Nassau, the Grand Duchy of Hesse, eastern and central Saxony, and single seats in the Neumark and Eastern Pomerania.

The new Reichstag approved the government's military appropriations bill by a narrow majority on 15 July. It raised the size of the standing army by 66,000 to 552,000 and shortened the period of military service from three to two years.

Graph of the party split among 397 seats.
Party	Votes	%	+/–	Seats	+/–
Social Democratic Party	1,786,738	23.28	+3.53	44	+9
Centre Party	1,468,501	19.14	+0.59	96	–11
German Conservative Party	992,412	12.93	+0.72	69	−2
National Liberal Party	943,410	12.29	−3.35	51	+13
Free-minded People's Party	665,427	8.67	−7.22	24	−43
German Reich Party	437,972	5.71	−0.67	28	+9
Free-minded Union	260,364	3.39	New	13	New
Independent Polish	172,482	2.25	−0.32	14	+3
German People's Party	166,757	2.17	+0.13	11	+1
German Reform Party	141,650	1.85	+1.55	14	+11
Alsace-Lorraine parties	135,546	1.77	−0.36	9	−5
German Social Party	110,451	1.44	+1.16	2	+2
German-Hanoverian Party	101,810	1.33	−0.23	7	−4
Independent liberals	56,372	0.73	−0.36	2	−2
Polish Court Party	53,973	0.70	−0.15	5	0
Bavarian Peasants' League	43,128	0.56	New	2	New
Independent conservatives	35,816	0.47	+0.17	2	+2
Other agrarians	25,909	0.34	New	1	New
Other conservatives	19,554	0.25	New	1	New
Danish Party	14,363	0.19	0.00	1	0
Independent anti-semites	11,760	0.15	+0.08	0	−1
Alsatian Liberals	6,469	0.08	New	1	New
Lithuanian Party	4,099	0.05	New	0	New
Polish People's Party	3,124	0.04	New	0	New
Christian Social Party	1,829	0.02	+0.02	0	0
Others	13,972	0.18	−0.28	0	0
Unknown	85	0.00	0.00	0	0
Total	7,673,973	100.00	–	397	0
Valid votes	7,673,973	99.63			
Invalid/blank votes	28,292	0.37			
Total votes	7,702,265	100.00			
Registered voters/turnout	10,628,292	72.47			
Source: Wahlen in Deutschland

=== Alsace-Lorraine ===
Party	Votes	%	+/–	Seats	+/–
Clericals	88,762	37.10	−8.86	6	−3
Social Democratic Party	46,186	19.30	+8.57	2	+1
Alsatian autonomists	25,940	10.84	−18.69	1	−3
German Reich Party	14,494	6.06	+5.42	1	+1
Independent conservatives	13,699	5.73	New	1	New
Alsace-Lorraine protesters	10,949	4.58	−5.86	1	0
Lorraine Bloc	9,895	4.14	+4.14	1	+1
Conservative Party	7,568	3.16	+2.57	1	+1
Alsatian Liberals	6,469	2.70	New	1	New
Free-minded People's Party	4,430	1.85	New	–	New
Independent liberals	4,107	1.72	New	–	New
Social Party	3,407	1.42	New	–	New
National Liberal Party	2,142	0.90	−0.13	0	0
Others	1,207	0.50	−0.55	0	0
Total	239,255	100.00	–	15	0
Valid votes	239,255	96.28			
Invalid/blank votes	9,236	3.72			
Total votes	248,491	100.00			
Registered voters/turnout	325,482	76.35			
Source: Wahlen in Deutschland
