= Theodor Fritsch =

German publisher and journalist (1852–1933)

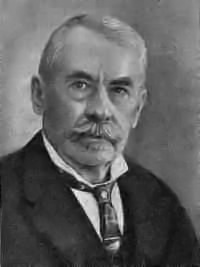
Theodor Fritsch about 1920

Theodor Fritsch (born Emil Theodor Fritsche; 28 October 1852 – 8 September 1933) was a German publisher and journalist. His antisemitic writings did much to influence popular German opinion against Jews in the late 19th and early 20th centuries. His writings also appeared under the pen names Thomas Frey, Fritz Thor, and Ferdinand Roderich-Stoltheim.

As a politician and organiser of the völkisch movement in the German Empire, Fritsch was a member of the German Social Party (1889–1893), founder of the Reichshammerbund and the Germanenorden (Germanic Order; both in 1912). He was also a promotor of the garden city movement. During the Weimar Republic he co-founded the antisemitic Deutschvölkischer Schutz- und Trutzbund (German Nationalist Protection and Defiance Federation) and the far-right German Völkisch Freedom Party (1922). In May 1924 he was elected to the Reichstag, representing the National Socialist Freedom Party (NSFP). Fritsch is considered an intellectual forerunner of Nazism and was regarded by Nazi leaders as the "doyen of the movement".

He is not to be confused with his son, also named Theodor Fritsch (1895–1946) and also a bookseller, who was a member of the paramilitary wing of the Nazi Party, the Sturmabteilung.

== Life ==
Fritsch was born Emil Theodor Fritsche, the sixth of seven children to Johann Friedrich Fritsche, a farmer in the village of Wiesenena (present-day Wiedemar) in the Prussian province of Saxony, and his wife August Wilhelmine, née Ohme. Four of his siblings died in childhood. He attended vocational school (Realschule) in Delitzsch where he learned casting and machine building. He then undertook study at the Royal Trade Academy (Königliche Gewerbeakademie) in Berlin, graduating as a technician in 1875.

In the same year Fritsche found employment in a Berlin machine shop. He gained independence in 1879 through the founding of a technical bureau associated with a publishing firm. In 1880 he founded the Deutscher Müllerbund (Miller's League) which issued the publication Der Deutsche Müller (The German Miller). In 1905 he founded the "Saxon Small Business Association." He devoted himself to this organization and to the interests of crafts and small businesses (Mittelstand), as well as to the spread of antisemitic propaganda. When he changed his name to Fritsch is unclear.

=== Publishing ===
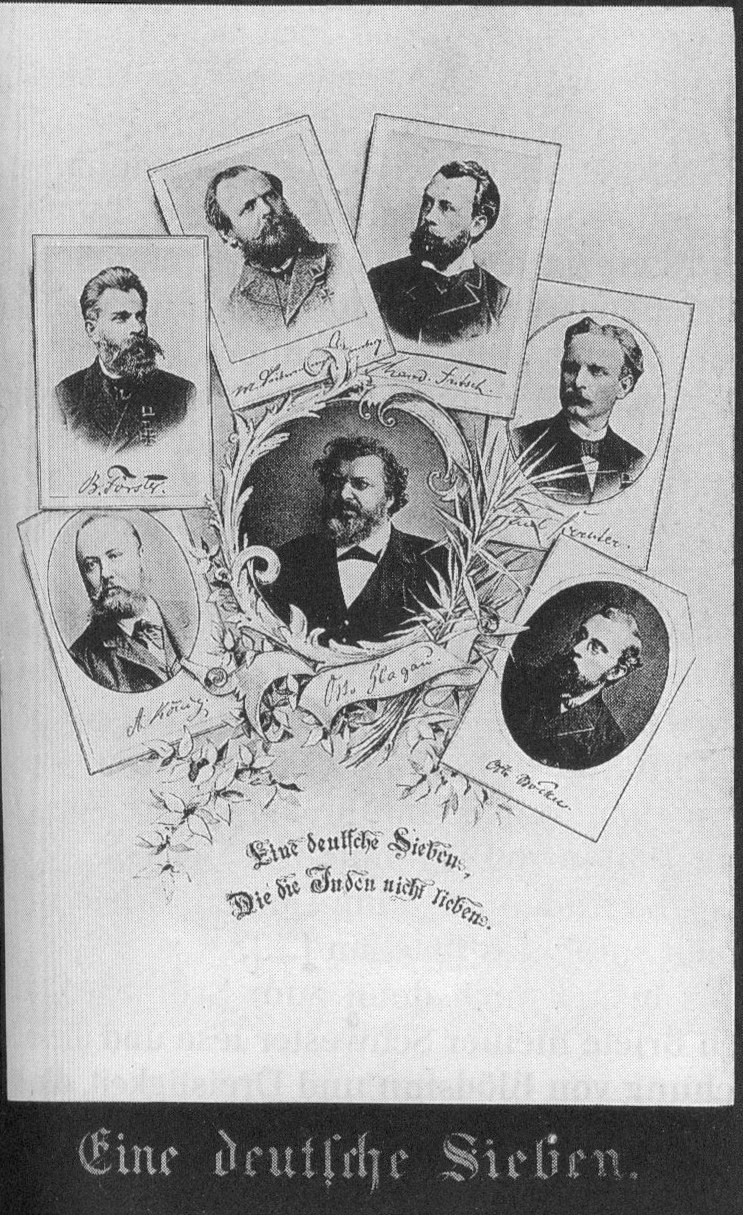
"A German Seven", montage of portraits of German antisemites c. 1880/1881. Centre: Otto Glagau, around him clockwise: Adolf König, Bernhard Förster, Max Liebermann von Sonnenberg, Theodor Fritsch, Paul Förster, and Otto Böckel.

Fritsch created an early discussion forum, "Antisemitic Correspondence" in 1885 for antisemites of various political persuasions. In 1887 he sent several editions to Friedrich Nietzsche but was brusquely dismissed. Nietzsche sent Fritsch a letter in which he thanked him to be permitted "to cast a glance at the muddle of principles that lie at the heart of this strange movement", but requested not to be sent again such writings, for he was afraid that he might lose his patience. Fritsch offered editorship to right-wing politician Max Liebermann von Sonnenberg in 1894, whereafter it became an organ for Sonnenberg's German Social Party under the name "German Social Articles." Fritsch' 1896 book The City of the Future became a blueprint of the German garden city movement which was adopted by Völkisch circles.

In 1902 Fritsch founded a Leipzig publishing house, Hammer-Verlag, whose flagship publication was The Hammer: Pages for German Sense (1902–1940). The firm issued German translations of The Protocols of the Elders of Zion and The International Jew (collected writings of Henry Ford from The Dearborn Independent) as well as many of Fritsch's own works. An inflammatory article published in 1910 earned him a charge of defamation of religious societies and disturbing the public peace. Fritsch was sentenced to one week in prison, and received another ten-day term in 1911.

=== Political activities ===
In 1890, Fritsch became, along with Otto Böckel, a candidate of the Antisemitic People's Party, founded by Böckel and Oswald Zimmermann, to the German Reichstag. He was not elected. The party was renamed German Reform Party in 1893, achieving sixteen seats. The party failed, however, to achieve significant public recognition. One of Fritsch's major goals was to unite all antisemitic political parties under a single banner; he wished for antisemitism to permeate the agenda of every German social and political organization. This effort proved largely to be a failure, as by 1890 there were over 190 various antisemitic parties in Germany. He also had a powerful rival for the leadership of the antisemites in Otto Böckel, with whom he had a strong personal rivalry.

In 1912 Fritsch founded the Reichshammerbund (Reich's Hammer League) as an antisemitic collective movement. He also established the secret Germanenorden in that year. Influenced by racist Ariosophic theories, it was one of the first political groups to adopt the swastika symbol. Members of these groups formed the Thule Society in 1918, which eventually sponsored the creation of the Nazi Party.

The Reichshammerbund was eventually folded into the Deutschvölkischer Schutz und Trutzbund (German Nationalist Protection and Defiance Federation), on whose advisory board Fritsch sat. He later became a member of the German Völkisch Freedom Party (DFVP). In the general election of May 1924, Fritsch was elected to serve as a member of the National Socialist Freedom Movement, a party formed in alliance with the DFVP by the Nazis as a legal means to election after the Nazi Party had been banned in the aftermath of the Munich Beer Hall Putsch. He only served until the next election in December, 1924.

In February 1927, Fritsch left the Völkisch Freedom Party in protest. He died shortly after the 1933 Nazi seizure of power at the age of 80 in Gautzsch (today part of Markkleeberg).

A memorial to Fritsch, described as "the first antisemitic memorial in Germany", was erected in Zehlendorf (Berlin) in 1935. The memorial was the idea of Zehlendorf's mayor, Walter Helfenstein (1890–1945), and the work of Arthur Wellmann (1885–1960). The memorial was melted down in 1943 to make armaments for the war.

== Works ==
A believer in the absolute superiority of the Aryan race, Fritsch was upset by the changes brought on by rapid industrialization and urbanization, and called for a return to the traditional peasant values and customs of the distant past, which he believed exemplified the essence of the Volk.

In 1893, Fritsch published his most famous work, The Handbook of the Jewish Question, which leveled a number of conspiratorial charges at European Jews and called upon Germans to refrain from intermingling with them. Vastly popular, the book was read by millions and was in its 49th edition by 1944 (330,000 copies). Fritsch also founded an antisemitic journal – the Hammer – in 1902, and this became the basis of a movement, the Reichshammerbund, in 1912.

Fritsch was an opponent of Albert Einstein's theory of relativity. He published Einsteins Truglehre (Einstein's Fraudulent Teachings) in 1921, under the pseudonym F. Roderich-Stoltheim (an anagram of his full name).

Another work, The Riddle of the Jew's Success, was published in English in 1927 under the pseudonym F. Roderich-Stoltheim.
