= Benno Jacob =

German rabbi

Benno Jacob (7 September 1862 – 24 January 1945) was a liberal rabbi and Bible scholar.

== Biography ==
Jacob studied in the Rabbinical Seminary and University of his native Breslau (now Wrocław, Poland). He served as a rabbi between the years 1891-1929 until he retired to Hamburg to concentrate on his exegetical work.

Already in his student years he was active in the fight against antisemitism, he founded a Jewish student's society that introduced fencing duels as a method of defending the honor of Judaism when it was degraded by antisemitic students. In 1892 he had a confrontation with Liebermann von Sonnenberg, a prominent antisemitic politician and publisher. After Sonnenberg delivered a two and a half hour lecture on the Talmud, Jacob, bearing a copy of the Talmud, challenged him to read out the passages he had referred to in his lecture. When Sonnenberg admitted that he could not read even a letter of the Hebrew language, Jacob chided him for speaking about a book which he could not even read and delivered an impromptu lecture of his own refuting the arguments previously advanced. After this pattern was repeated a few more times Liebermann von Sonnenberg was forced to cancel his tour. Jacob was also an active author and orator in the fight against German antisemitism in the years following World War I. He opposed Zionism not only because of his belief in a Jewish-German synthesis, but also because he saw in Zionism a complete secularization of Judaism and a basis for Jewish atheism.

== Biblical studies ==
Benno Jacob was a scholarly liberal rabbi (with a University degree in Semitics) in Germany until World War II. Before leaving Germany, he produced a monumental commentary on Genesis. Recently, a German edition of his commentary on Exodus has been published. Generally, Jacob is linked with Umberto Cassuto as one of the great twentieth-century opponents of the Documentary Hypothesis.

Jacob was not a fundamentalist and did not believe in Mosaic authorship. His rejection of the Documentary Hypothesis was based on his sense that the Pentateuch presents so much literary unity and spiritual harmony that a search for its "sources" could only be an exercise in futile hypothesis.

Melding a traditionalist (if not traditional) view of the Torah with a knowledge of Semitics and applying a Germanic thoroughness to his conviction that no word in the Torah is out of place, he produced two commentaries which attempt to explain nearly every nuance of every word in the Torah.

The programmatic statement in his 1916 book, Quellenscheiden und Exegese im Pentateuch, illustrates his concerns:

[The Torah's] means of representation may be termed the semi-poetic or dichotomistic. It proceeds like poetry, but without its strict measure [i.e., meter], employing instead paired thoughts, patterns of words and clauses and syntax, in doublets, parallels and contrasts; it is rooted, when all is said and done, in the Semitic [way of thought], which grasps matters dichotomously. This manner of seeing, conceiving and representing dominates the Hebrew language and literature in its entirety, to its subtlest manifestations.

== Bibliography ==
- Das erste Buch der Tora, Genesis. Übersetzt und erklärt von Benno Jacob, Schocken Verlag, Berlin 1934 (Neudruck 1999). Condensed English trans. The First Book of the Bible: Genesis (New York: Ktav, 1974).
- Das Buch Exodus, Stuttgart 1997. English trans., The Second Book of the Bible: Exodus (Hoboken, NJ: Ktav, 1992)
- Das Buch Ester bei den LXX, in ZAW 10 (1890), S. 241-298
- Im Namen Gottes, Berlin 1903
- Der Pentateuch, exegetisch-kritische Forschungen. Leipzig 1905
- Die Abzählungen in den Büchern Leviticus und Numeri, Frankfurt a. M. 1909
- Die Thora Moses, Frankfurt a. M. 1912/13
- Quellenscheidung und Exegese im Pentateuch, Leipzig 1916
- Auge um Auge, Berlin 1929

== Additional sources ==
- An analysis of Jacob's work by Dr. J. Elman
- Letter from Nechama Leibowitz describing her view of Jacob's work
- Encyclopaedia Judaica entry- Benno Jacob 2nd ed.
