= Max Liebermann von Sonnenberg =

German politician (1848–1911)

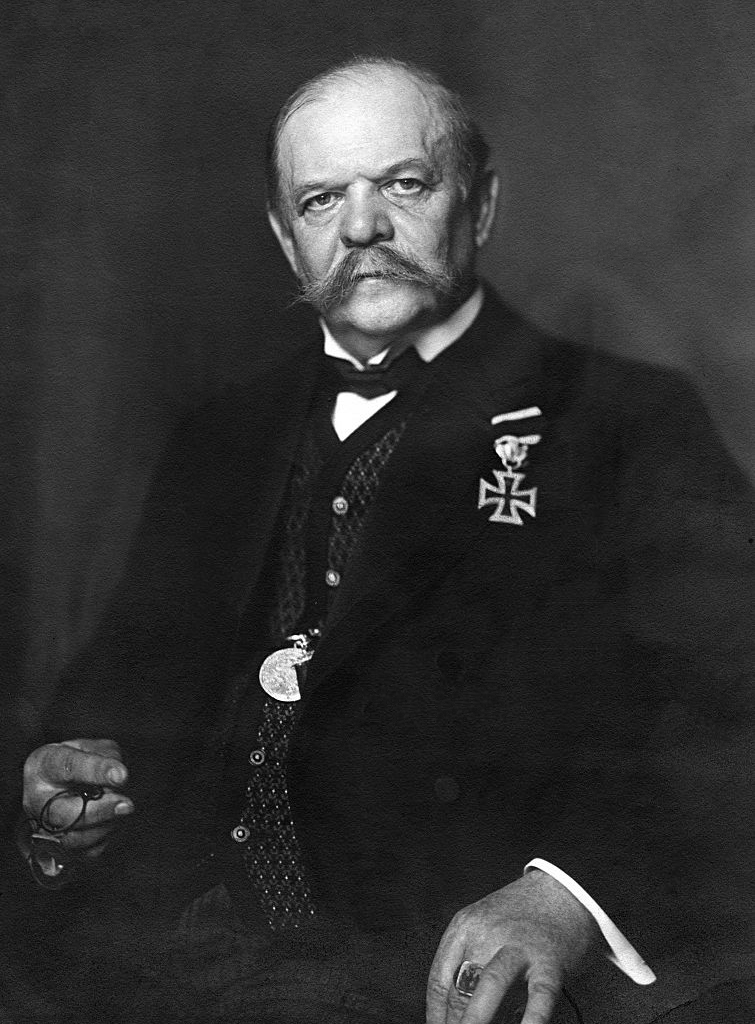
Max Liebermann von Sonnenberg by Nicola Perscheid c. 1910

Max Liebermann von Sonnenberg (21 August 1848, Bielska Struga – 17 November 1911) was a German officer who became noted as an antisemitic politician and publisher. He was part of a wider campaign against German Jews that became a central feature of nationalist politics in Imperial Germany in the late nineteenth century.

== Career ==
The foundation of the Christian Social Party by Adolf Stoecker in 1878 helped to galvanise antisemitic activity in Germany and brought Liebermann von Sonnenberg, then an officer in the German Imperial Army, to politics. He came to the fore in 1880 when he was central to the organisation of a petition calling for the removal of the Jews from all public positions. The petition attracted as many as 225,000 signatories.

Joining Bernhard Förster, the brother-in-law of Friedrich Nietzsche, he set up the Deutscher Volksverein (German People's League) in 1881 to support the antisemitic agenda. The group struggled for support as it focused on a single issue that spawned a number of movements at the time and it declined further when Förster left for Paraguay in 1886 to set up his ill-fated Nueva Germania project.

Following a June 1889 conference of antisemites in Bochum Liebermann von Sonnenberg set up his own political party, the Deutsch-Soziale Partei, which became the Deutschsoziale Reformpartei when it merged with Otto Böckel's Deutsche Reformpartei in 1894. Active co-operation had actually started at the 1890 election when a joint list captured five seats in the Reichstag. The two leaders however often found themselves in disagreement as Liebermann von Sonnenberg was basically a conservative whilst Böckel held a more radical world-view beyond his antisemitism, including a desire for land reform.

Liebermann von Sonnenberg undertook antisemitic lecture tours, although in 1892 he was forced to abandon one such tour after his credibility suffered a blow at the hands of Rabbi Benno Jacob. Delivering a two and a half hour lecture on the Talmud he was confronted at its conclusion by Jacob, bearing a copy of the Talmud and demanding Liebermann von Sonnenberg read out the passages he had referred to in his lecture. When Liebermann von Sonnenberg admitted that he could not read even a letter of the Hebrew language, Jacob chided him for speaking about a book which he could not even read and delivered an impromptu lecture of his own refuting the arguments previously advanced. After this pattern was repeated a few more times Liebermann von Sonnenberg was forced to cancel his tour.

His conservatism proved a problem for Liebermann von Sonnenberg when he purchased the newspaper Antisemitic Correspondence from Theodor Fritsch and promptly lost most of the readership after he dispensed with Fritsch's attacks on leading German figures and organised Christianity. Liebermann von Sonnenberg's only rhetoric in this vein was directed against Germany's Roman Catholic population when he questioned their patriotism by suggesting that every Catholic had "his feet in Germany but his head in Rome".

Liebermann von Sonnenberg was elected to the Reichstag and soon became noted for his attempts to introduce a bill to ban all Jewish immigration during every session of the Reichstag. His 1897 bill that sought to reintroduce denominational oaths in court cases was passed and represented the only occasion when a bill introduced by one of the antisemites was successful.

== Personal life and death ==
von Sonnenberg continued to represent his constituency of Fritzlar until his death in 1911.
