= Tivoli Congress =

The Tivoli Congress was a general meeting of the German Conservative Party, which took place on December 8, 1892 in the Tivoli Brewery on the Kreuzberg. It was a major turning point for the party, as the first time that antisemitism became widely supported as a policy. Several members believed that the party had to become more "demagogic", and that the way to do this was to embrace the current trend of antisemitism. Ultimately, the party began a new program that openly supported antisemitism, which continued until 1918.
