= 1907 German federal election =

- 25 January 1907

All 397 seats in the Reichstag 199 seats needed for a majority
- Registered: 13,352,880 ▲6.56%
- Turnout: 11,303,537 (84.65%) ▲8.57pp
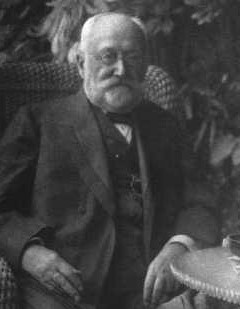

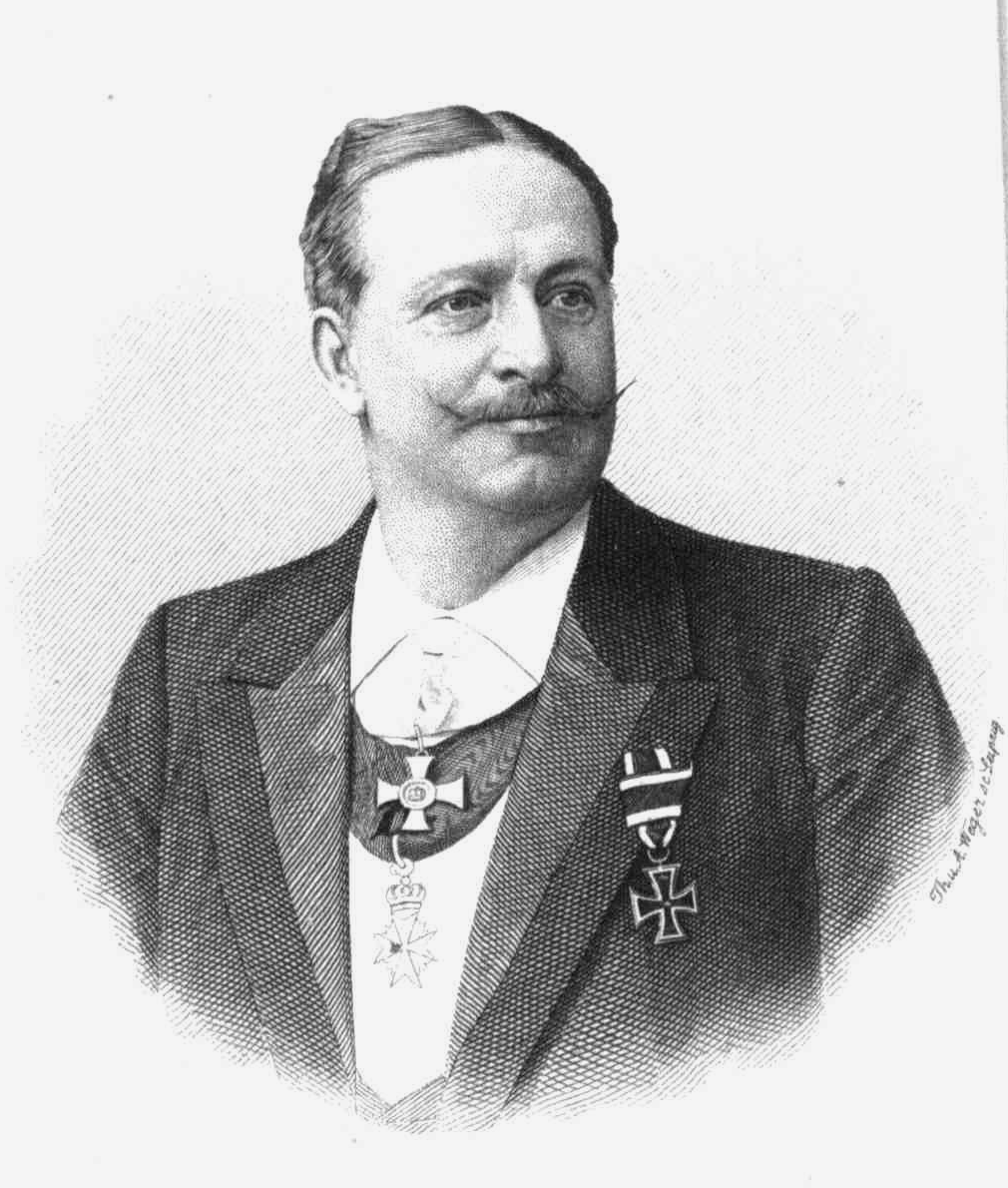

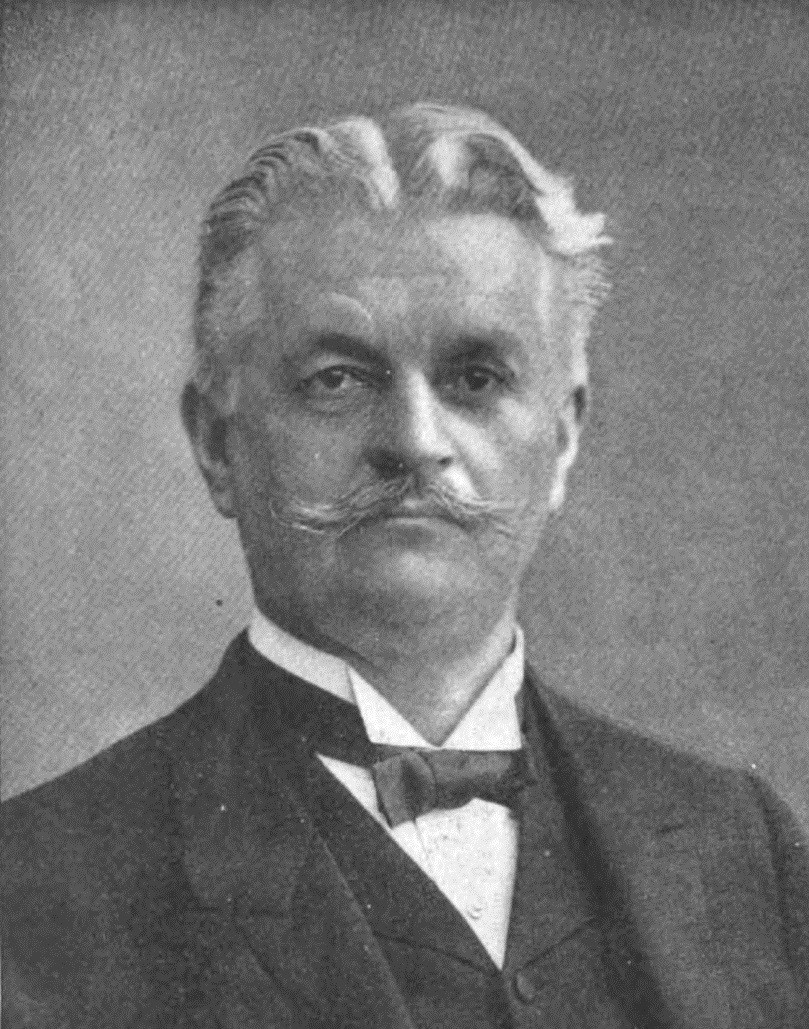

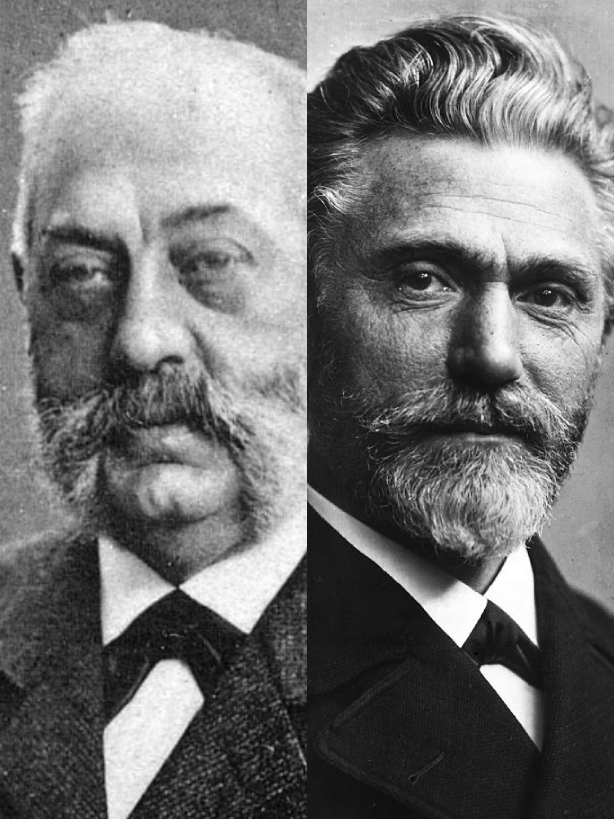

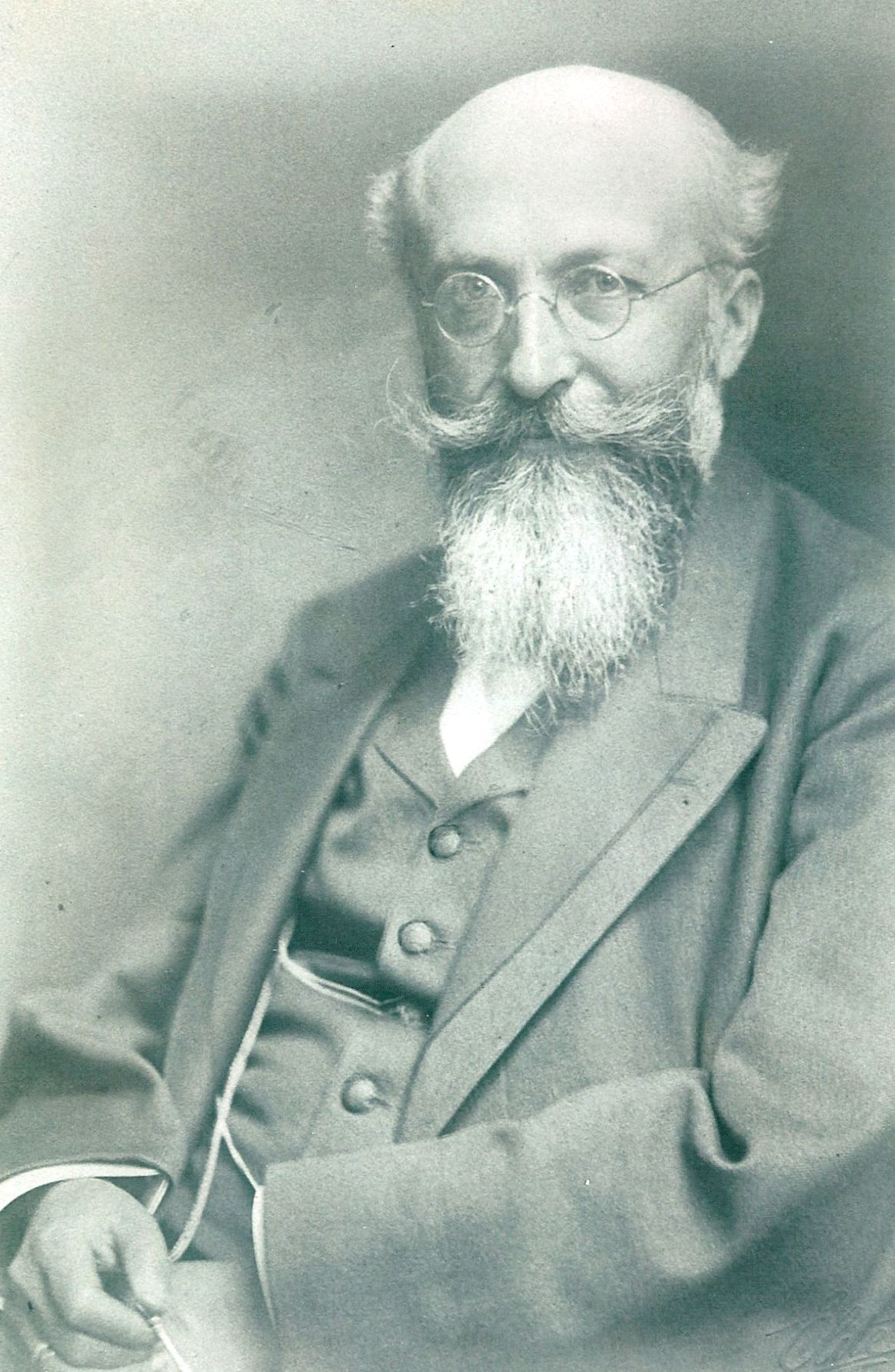
	First party	Second party	Third party
Leader	Franz von Ballestrem	Otto von Manteuffel	Ernst Bassermann
Party	Centre	DKP	NLP
Last election	19.75%, 100 seats	9.49%, 52 seats	13.71%, 50 seats
Seats won	101	59	56
Seat change	▲1	▲7	▲6
Popular vote	2,116,246	1,060,209	1,666,705
Percentage	18.79%	9.41%	14.80%
Swing	▼0.96 pp	▼0.08 pp	▲1.10 pp
	Fourth party	Fifth party	Sixth party
			DRP
Leader	Paul Singer & August Bebel	Hermann Müller-Sagan
Party	SPD	FVP	DRP
Last election	31.71%, 81 seats	5.65%, 21 seats	3.54%, 21 seats
Seats won	43	29	24
Seat change	▼38	▲8	▲3
Popular vote	3,259,029	737,220	471,863
Percentage	28.94%	6.55%	4.19%
Swing	▼2.77 pp	▲0.90 pp	▲0.65 pp
- Map of results (by constituencies)
President of the Reichstag before election
Franz von Ballestrem
Centre
President of the Reichstag after election
Udo zu Stolberg-Wernigerode
Independent

Federal elections were held in Germany on 25 January 1907. Despite the Social Democratic Party (SPD) receiving a clear plurality of votes, they were hampered by the unequal constituency sizes that favoured rural seats. As a result, the Centre Party remained the largest party in the Reichstag after winning 101 of the 397 seats, whilst the SPD won only 43. Voter turnout was 84.7%.

This election was known as the "Hottentot election" due to the scandal over the ongoing Herero and Nama genocide perpetrated by colonial authorities in German South West Africa.

== Campaign ==
The election became known as the "Hottentot Election" because its causes and campaign were dominated by the ongoing Herero and Nama genocide perpetrated by colonial authorities in the colony of German South West Africa. The Nama people were referred to as "Hottentots", a term that was derogatory even at the time. The sustained and increasingly expensive colonial war led to a political crisis in Germany on 2 August 1906, when the government requested an appropriation of 29 million marks from the Reichstag. The Social Democratic Party of Germany (SPD), in particular, refused to approve further money given the ruthless conduct of German colonial authorities in suppressing the Herero uprising which presaged the genocide. The government attempted to settle the conflict by making concessions, but soon met opposition from Centre Party representative Matthias Erzberger in particular, who criticised the extensive spending and argued against the colonial wars. This led to the Centre Party group, against the will of some of its members, voting against the appropriation. On the other hand, the Conservatives and National Liberals were vehemently in favour of continuing the colonial war. On the 13th of December, the vote in the Reichstag came down with a narrow majority of 177 to 168 against the appropriation.

On the same day, Chancellor Bernhard von Bülow ordered the Reichstag dissolved with the agreement of Emperor Wilhelm II. One reason for dissolving the legislature over such a minor issue was that the Emperor as well as parts of the bureaucracy had increasing reservations about the Centre Party. Bülow, who did not share this position and would have liked to continue relying on the centre, gave in to this. He hoped that establishing a new political majority would allow him to restore his damaged trust with the Emperor. Under the circumstances, the only way to do this would be to resume the former Cartel Parties alliance between Conservatives and National Liberals, expanded to include the left-liberal parties. Following the death of Eugen Richter the previous year, the left-liberals had tended to indicate their willingness to support the government. This alliance came to pass and is generally referred to as the Bülow Bloc. Through the mediation of the government, agreements were reached to cooperate during runoff elections, which had now become common.

During the election campaign, the government itself would be responsible for setting the tone, with its demands for a reliable majority on "national issues" and the struggle against the Social Democrats, who were seen as an enemy of monarchy, religion and property, and against the "unreliable" Centre Party. The goal was to create a nationalist, anti-socialist and anti-clerical bloc out of the Cartel parties and the left-liberals. This was supported by the newly founded National Association Against Social Democracy.

== Results ==
The SPD gained around a quarter of a million votes compared to 1903, receiving 10% more of the vote than any other party, although the high turnout meant the SPD's vote share in total was down. Also affecting the Social Democrats negatively were the runoff agreements between the parties of the bloc. So, despite their high share of the vote, they only won 43 seats compared to 81 in 1903. The centre were able to make gains, going from 100 to 105 seats. The bloc parties made minor seat gains, primarily because their electoral agreements meant they did not compete with each other. The two conservative parties increased their seat number from 75 to 84. Even more minor were the gains for the National Liberals, who rose from 51 to 54 seats. However, the left-liberals made clearer gains, improving their position from 36 to 49 seats. In total, when counting minor parties and independents aligned with it, the bloc achieved a majority of 220 out of 397 seats.

Also notable was the success of Polish candidates in Upper Silesia, winning five out of the region's twelve constituencies. This was in contrast to the elections from 1871 to 1898, in which, despite the Polish-speaking majority, no Polish candidate ever won a seat there. This politicisation of the Upper Silesian Poles was primarily caused by the anti-Polish linguistic and cultural policies of the Prussian state government (see the Września school strike).

Graph of the party split among 397 seats.
Party	Votes	%	+/–	Seats	+/–
Social Democratic Party	3,259,029	28.94	−2.77	43	−38
Centre Party	2,116,246	18.79	−0.96	101	+1
National Liberal Party	1,666,705	14.80	+1.10	56	+6
German Conservative Party	1,060,209	9.41	−0.08	59	+7
Free-minded People's Party	737,220	6.55	+0.90	29	+8
German Reich Party	471,863	4.19	+0.65	24	+3
Free-minded Union	338,639	3.01	+0.55	14	+6
Independent Polish	240,287	2.13	+0.40	10	+2
German People's Party	123,731	1.10	0.24	7	+2
Agrarian League	131,688	1.17	−0.36	7	+2
German Reform Party	114,807	1.02	−0.44	6	0
Alsace-Lorraine parties	149,055	1.32	−0.01	11	0
German-Hanoverian Party	92,811	0.82	−0.24	2	−5
Polish People's Party	88,628	0.79	−0.31	4	−1
German Social Party	88,344	0.78	−0.16	8	+5
Independent liberals	85,899	0.76	+0.66	3	0
Middle Class parties	74,811	0.66	+0.59	2	+2
Christian Social Party	61,555	0.55	+0.12	3	+1
Other liberals	53,505	0.48	+0.11	0	0
Polish Catholic Party	49,801	0.44	New	3	New
Independent conservatives	48,620	0.43	+0.19	0	−1
Bavarian Peasants' League	41,137	0.37	−0.32	0	−2
Polish Court Party	39,393	0.35	−0.01	2	0
Polish National Party	35,499	0.32	−0.15	1	0
Other agrarians	30,465	0.27	−0.21	1	0
Independent anti-semites	15,563	0.14	+0.07	0	0
Danish Party	15,425	0.14	−0.02	1	0
Other left-liberals	14,599	0.13	−0.22	0	0
Lithuanian Party	4,221	0.04	−0.02	0	0
Other conservatives	4,068	0.04	+0.03	0	0
Others	8,268	0.07	−0.04	0	0
Unknown	738	0.01	0.00	0	0
Total	11,262,829	100.00	–	397	0
Valid votes	11,262,829	99.64			
Invalid/blank votes	40,708	0.36			
Total votes	11,303,537	100.00			
Registered voters/turnout	13,352,880	84.65			
Source: Wahlen in Deutschland

=== Alsace-Lorraine ===
Party	Votes	%	+/–	Seats	+/–
Alsace-Lorraine Center Party	92,668	26.97	+2.53	7	+1
Social Democratic Party	81,589	23.75	−0.42	2	+2
Independent Lorraine Party	48,504	14.12	−1.69	3	−1
Centre Party	43,348	12.62	+5.53	1	+1
Lorraine Land Party	22,311	6.49	New	0	New
Alsatian Liberals	16,318	4.75	−4.34	0	−2
Alsace Liberal Group	14,876	4.33	+1.08	0	−1
German Reich Party	9,469	2.76	−0.74	1	0
Alsace-Lorraine protesters	7,883	2.29	−0.60	1	0
Free-minded Union	5,638	1.64	−0.97	0	0
Others	738	0.21	−0.13	0	0
Unknown	215	0.06	+0.06	0	0
Total	343,557	100.00	–	15	0
Valid votes	343,557	99.12			
Invalid/blank votes	3,054	0.88			
Total votes	346,611	100.00			
Registered voters/turnout	397,255	87.25			
Source: Wahlen in Deutschland
