= German Social Party (German Empire) =

German Social Party Deutschsoziale Partei
- Founded: 1889
- Dissolved: March 1914
- Merged into: German Social Reform Party (1894); German Völkisch Party (1914)
- Ideology: Völkisch nationalism Protectionism; Lebensraum; Antisemitism
- Political position: Far-right
- National affiliation: Economic Union

The German Social Party (German: Deutschsoziale Partei or DSP) was a far-right political party active in the German Empire.

== Establishment ==
The group was established in 1889 by Max Liebermann von Sonnenberg, already widely known in antisemitic circles thanks to his Antisemites' Petition of 1880, his establishment of a short-lived string of discussion clubs called the Deutscher Volksverein and his prominence in the Berlin movement.

The party contested the 1890 Reichstag election with Liebermann von Sonnenberg gaining their only seat. He remained a member of parliament representing the constituency of Fritzlar–Homberg–Ziegenhain in Northern Hesse until his death in 1911.

== Ideology ==
The group was strongly influenced by the thoughts of Adolf Stoecker but sought to take his ideas further. Their programme of 1890 called for the "nullification of civil rights laws" as applied to Jews and for the passing of a new Jew law which would treat Jewish Germans as a new category of aliens. Its initial areas of activity were in Bochum and Erfurt.

Vaguely anti-democratic, they sought the gradual elimination of parliament in favour of more of a trades-based system of representation, although these ideas were largely underdeveloped. The DSP also actively supported German colonial expansion, a common feature of contemporary German antisemitic rhetoric that emphasised economic autarky and lebensraum as bulwarks against the Jews. Wilhelm Lattmann, who represented the DSP in the Reichstag, became especially noted for pushing the party's imperialist agenda as well as his attacks on "race-mixing" in the colonies. They also supported protectionism for German artisans, merchants and farmers.

== Connections to other groups ==
Although he personally disapproved of party politics, Theodor Fritsch was nonetheless attracted to the group's positions on the Jews and reprinted DSP propaganda in his journals. Through Fritsch the group also became close to Paul de Lagarde and asked him to run as a candidate for the Reichstag in 1889, an invitation he declined. Fritsch would eventually split with the DSP, his occultist views being at odds with the DSP, which was firmly Christian in outlook.

The DSP was very close to the German National Association of Commercial Employees, a white-collar workers union that was equally notorious for its anti-Jewish rhetoric. Willibald Hentschel, an influential writer who sought to promote the supremacy of the Aryan race, and who as such was subsequently seen as a progenitor of Nazism, served on the party's board of directors. Heinrich Pudor, the Volkish commentator and pioneer of nudism, was also loosely associated with the DSP, speaking at some of their functions.

One of a number of antisemitic parties active at the time, it merged with the German Reform Party (previously the Antisemitic People's Party) in 1894 to form the German Social Reform Party. This group was riven by splits and personality conflicts throughout its existence however and came to an end in 1900, when the DSP was re-established. Liebermann von Sonnenberg clashed in particular with Oswald Zimmermann, another leading figure in the merged group. Differences had also been partially political, with the DSP considered the least radical of the antisemitic parties, with Friedrich Lange considering it alone as one of the "parties of order" during a failed attempt to forge a united party of the right.

== Later activity ==
One of the DSP's centres of activity became Marburg, with the Reichstag seat won for the party in 1907 by Karl Böhme and by Johann Heinrich Rupp in 1912. The seat had previously been held by Otto Böckel and Hellmut von Gerlach, both of whom were also associated with antisemitism. In the Reichstag the DSP representatives collaborated closely with the Christian Social Party and the German Agrarian League. In his early years Ernst Graf zu Reventlow, who became prominent under the Nazis, was also a DSP member and ran unsuccessfully in the elections of 1907 and 1912.

In March 1914, the DSP merged with the equally antisemitic German Reform Party to form the German Völkisch Party (DvP). At the end of the First World War, in November 1918, its remnants were absorbed by the newly established German National People's Party (DNVP), joining the remains of the Christian Socials, the German Conservative Party and the Free Conservative Party.
