= 1890 German federal election =

- 20 February 1890

All 397 seats in the Reichstag 199 seats needed for a majority
- Registered: 10,145,402
- Turnout: 71.58% (▼5.91pp)
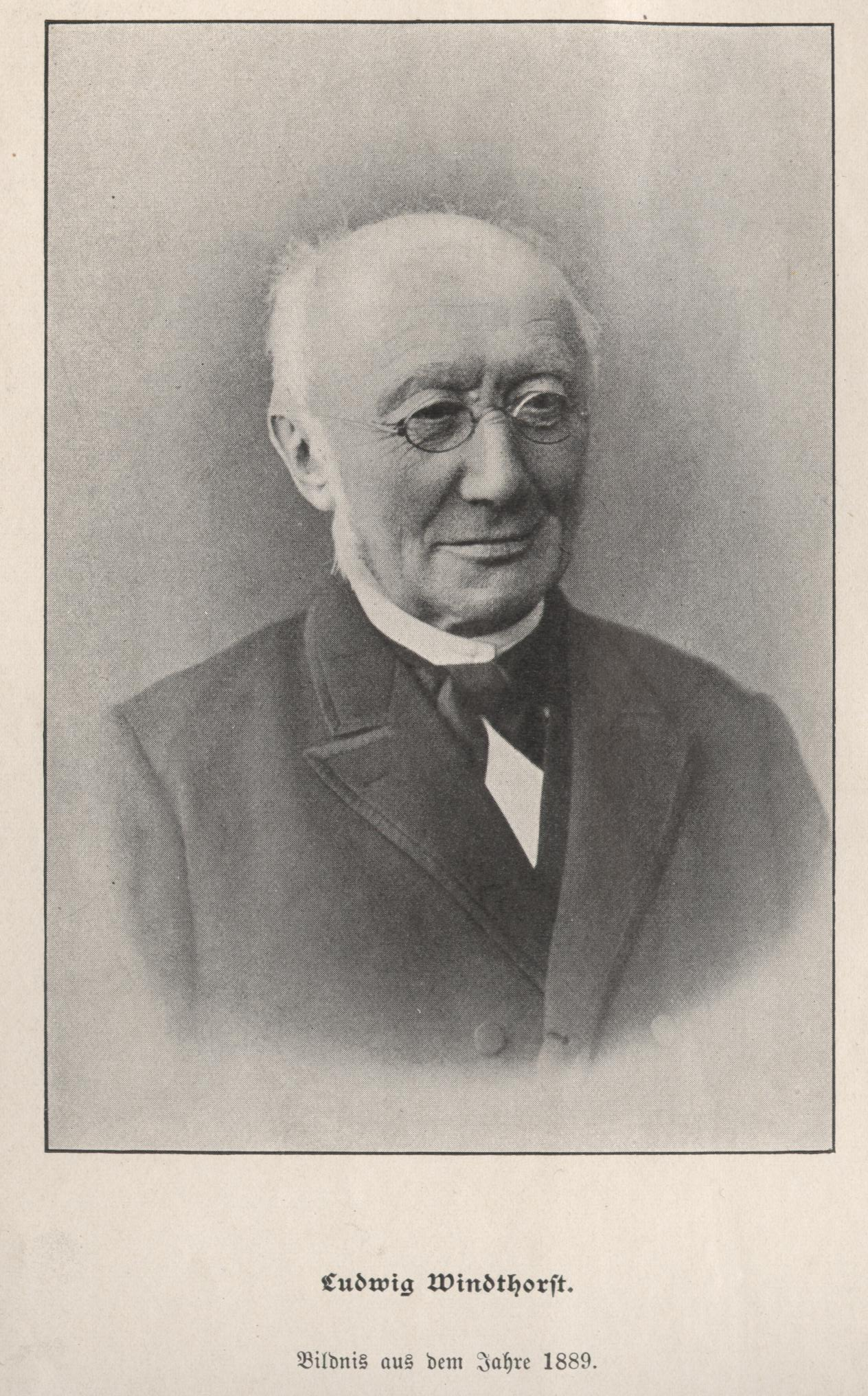

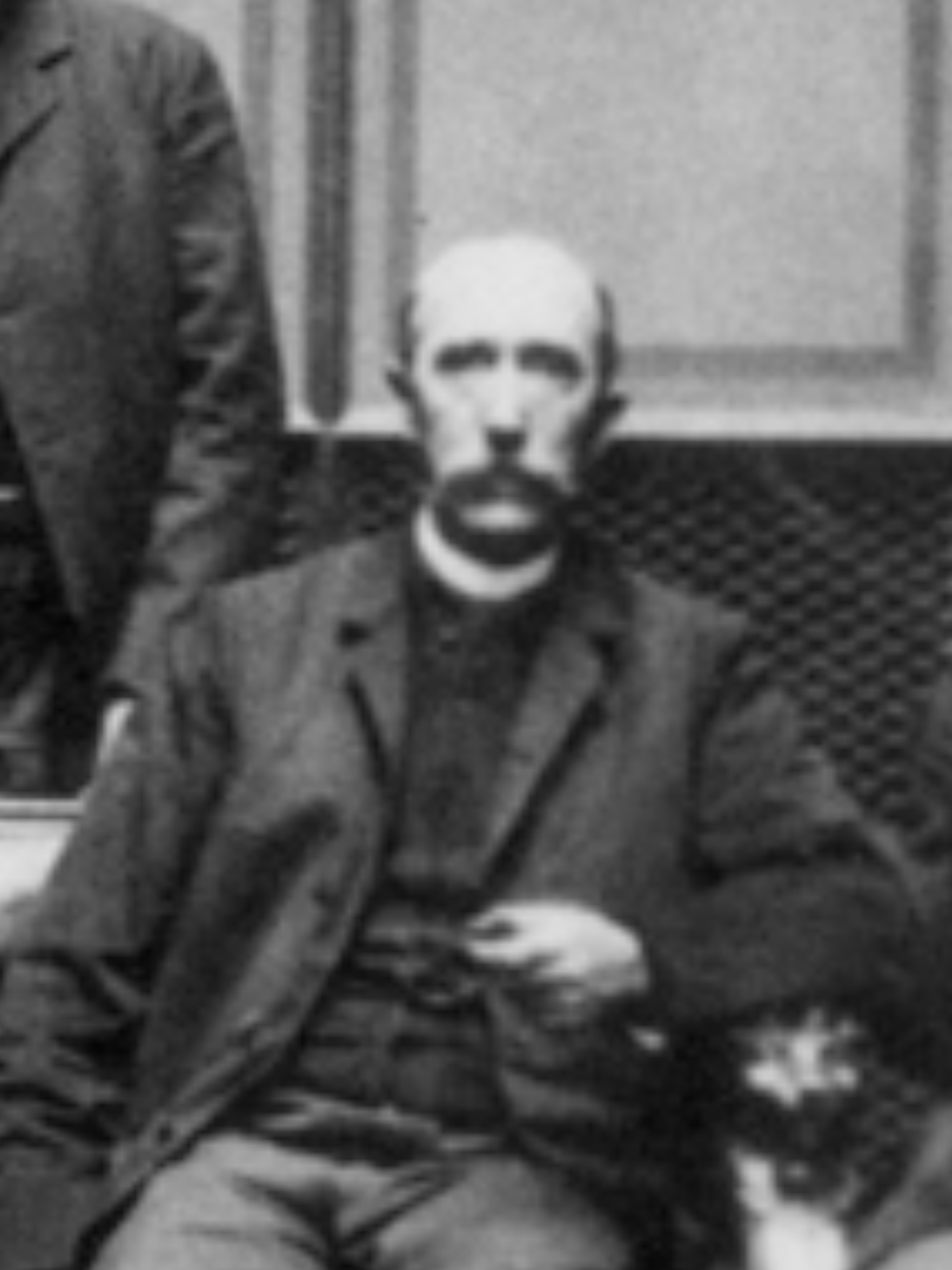

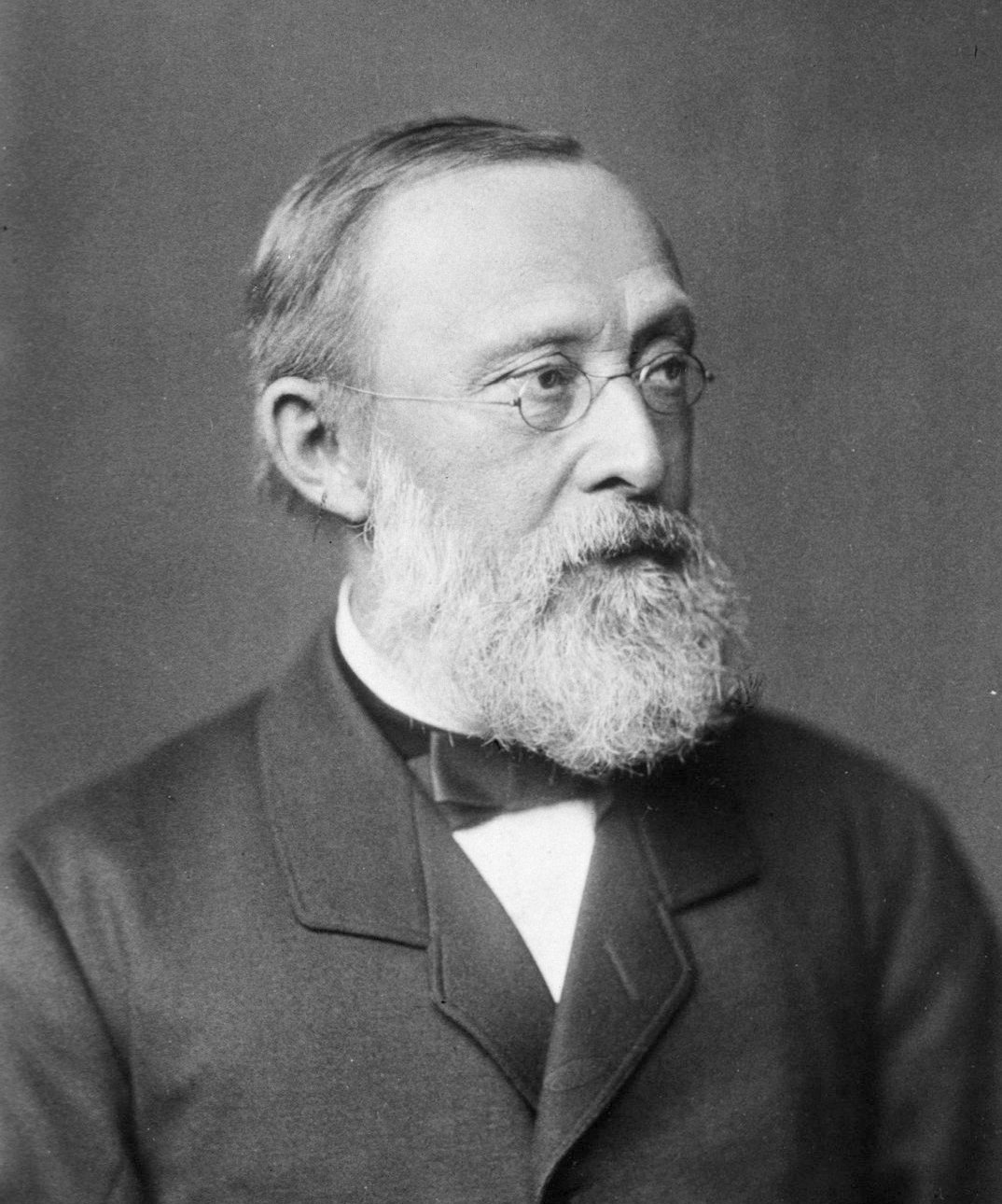

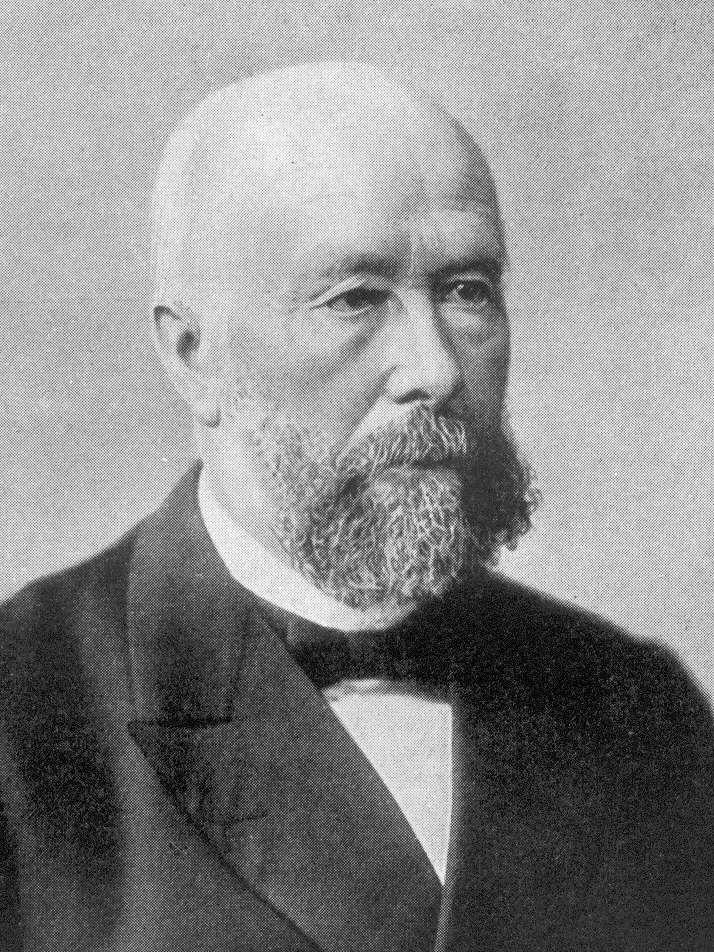

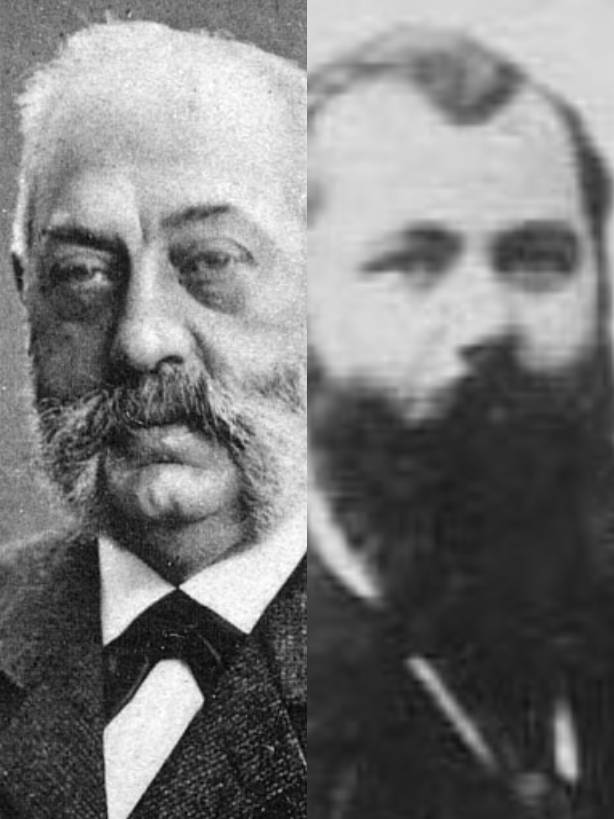

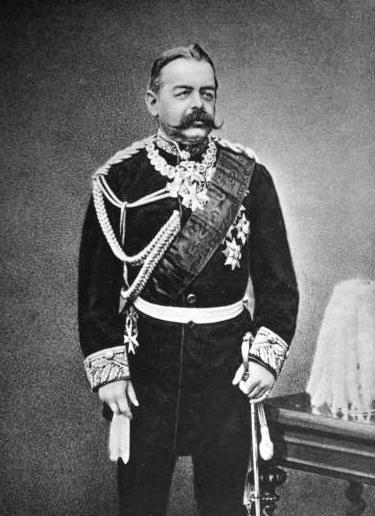
	First party	Second party	Third party
Leader	Ludwig Windthorst	Otto von Helldorff	Rudolf Virchow
Party	Centre	DKP	DFP
Last election	19.91%, 98 seats	15.21%, 80 seats	12.62%, 32 seats
Seats won	107	71	67
Seat change	▲9	▼9	▲35
Popular vote	1,340,688	882,820	1,148,468
Percentage	18.55%	12.21%	15.89%
Swing	▼1.36 pp	▼3.00 pp	▲3.27 pp
	Fourth party	Fifth party	Sixth party
Leader	Rudolf von Bennigsen	Paul Singer; Alwin Gerisch	Viktor I, Duke of Ratibor
Party	NLP	SPD	DRP
Last election	21.90%, 98 seats	10.12%, 11 seats	9.77%, 41 seats
Seats won	38	35	19
Seat change	▼60	▲24	▼22
Popular vote	1,130,842	1,427,323	461,307
Percentage	15.64%	19.75%	6.38%
Swing	▼6.26 pp	▲9.63 pp	▼3.39 pp
- Results by constituency
President of the Reichstag before election
Albert von Levetzow
DKP
President of the Reichstag after election
Albert von Levetzow
DKP

A federal election for the eighth Reichstag of the German Empire was held on 20 February 1890. It was an early election called after Chancellor Otto von Bismarck requested that the Reichstag elected in February 1887 be dissolved because it had refused to extend the Anti-Socialist Laws. He thought that a newly elected Reichstag would be more likely to pass the bill, but the parties that supported him – the German Conservative Party, German Reich Party and National Liberals, known as the Cartel parties – lost 91 seats and their majority in parliament.

The Centre Party regained its position as the largest party, winning 107 of the 397 seats and 18.6% of the vote, while the National Liberal Party, formerly the largest party, was reduced to 38 seats. The Social Democratic Party won the most votes with 19.8%, but that translated to only 35 seats due to the lack of redistricting and the first-past-the-post voting system. Voter turnout was 71.5%.

The 1890 Reichstag was the first to be elected after the 1888 constitutional change of term lengths from three to five years.

== Background ==
The previous Reichstag election in 1887 was held early after Emperor Wilhelm I, at Chancellor Otto von Bismarck's request, dissolved the Reichstag when it failed to pass Bismarck's seven-year military budget. Bismarck hoped, with good reason, that a new Reichstag would approve the bill. The three Cartel parties – the German Conservative Party, German Reich Party (Free Conservatives) and National Liberals – picked up 53 additional seats in the election for a total of 219 out of 397, giving them a 55% majority. On 11 March 1887, just a few weeks after the election, the Reichstag approved Bismarck's military budget with the seven-year period he wanted.

On 9 February 1888, the Reichstag amended the Reich constitution to extend the legislative term from three to five years. The move was taken to extend the life of the existing majority coalition and with it Bismarck's ability to govern.

Wilhelm I died on 9 March 1888 and his son Frederick III, who was gravely ill when he ascended the throne, died on 15 June, leaving the crown to Wilhelm II. Unlike his grandfather, Wilhelm II involved himself in day-to-day politics and in doing so came into conflict with Chancellor Bismarck. Bismarck's attempt to make the Anti-Socialist Laws permanent was defeated in the Reichstag on 25 January 1890, a failure that was the result of divisions within the Cartel parties. Wilhelm immediately dissolved the Reichstag at Bismarck's request even though he disapproved of the Anti-Socialist Laws and wanted to introduce labour protection legislation. He was willing to follow Bismarck because he wanted to increase the military budget and knew that Bismarck could help him see it through the Reichstag.

== Electoral system ==
The election was held under general, equal, direct and secret suffrage. All German males over the age of 25 years were able to vote except for active members of the military and recipients of poor relief. The restrictions on the military were meant to keep it from becoming politicized, while men on relief were considered to be open to political manipulation. The constitutional guarantee of a secret vote was not safeguarded at the time, since ballot boxes and polling booths were not introduced until 1903.

If no candidate in a district won an absolute majority of the votes, a runoff election was held between the first- and second-place finishers. It was possible for a replacement candidate to be introduced in a runoff.

== Results ==
The election was a major defeat for Bismarck and the Cartel parties, which together lost 91 seats. The Centre Party remained the strongest party, winning 106 constituencies (27.2% of seats) with 18.6% of the popular vote. The left-liberal parties also made significant gains in votes and representation. For the first time, a member of a German party (the SPD) won a seat in Alsace-Lorraine. Regionalists made gains off the decline of the Cartel parties. Antisemites gained only 0.7% of the votes but won five constituencies. Their strongholds were the Grand Duchy of Hesse and Hesse-Nassau.

The Social Democrats nearly doubled their vote share compared to the 1887 election and won the popular vote for the first time with over 1.4 million votes, or 19.75% of the total. From his London exile, Friedrich Engels proclaimed that the day of polling was “the day the German revolution began”. In spite of the SPD's popular vote, the party won only 35 seats (8.8% of the 397). One of the reasons for the low seat count was that Germany had not redistricted since 1871, when each district had about 100,000 voters. In the 20 intervening years, there had been considerable rural to urban migration due to industrialisation. The SPD, with its predominantly urban electorate, suffered disproportionately because each vote in a heavily populated urban district carried less weight than a vote in a sparsely populated rural district. A second reason was that the German Empire used a first-past-the-post voting system in which a candidate in a district could win in the first round only by obtaining an absolute majority of the votes cast. If a second round was necessary, the conservative and national liberal parties generally formed electoral alliances, often against the SPD candidate. The SPD seldom entered into such alliances.

Wilhelm II dismissed Bismarck from office a month after the election and replaced him with Leo von Caprivi. The Reichstag allowed the Anti-Socialist Laws to lapse on 30 September 1890.

Graph of the party split among 397 seats.
Party	Votes	%	+/–	Seats	+/–
Social Democratic Party	1,427,323	19.75	+9.63	35	+24
Centre Party	1,340,688	18.55	−1.36	107	+9
German Free-minded Party	1,148,468	15.89	+3.27	67	+35
National Liberal Party	1,130,842	15.64	−6.26	38	−60
German Conservative Party	882,820	12.21	−3.00	71	−9
German Reich Party	461,307	6.38	−3.39	19	−22
Independent Polish	185,417	2.57	New	11	New
Alsace-Lorraine parties	153,667	2.13	−0.97	14	−1
German People's Party	147,570	2.04	+0.86	10	+10
German-Hanoverian Party	112,675	1.56	−0.02	11	+7
Independent liberals	78,762	1.09	+0.12	4	+1
Polish Court Party	61,356	0.85	New	5	New
German Reform Party	21,918	0.30	New	3	New
Independent conservatives	21,413	0.30	−0.12	0	0
German Social Party	20,573	0.28	New	0	New
Danish Party	13,672	0.19	+0.03	1	0
Independent anti-semites	5,045	0.07	−0.08	1	0
Others	14,845	0.21	+0.09	0	0
Unknown	209	0.00	0.00	0	0
Total	7,228,570	100.00	–	397	0
Valid votes	7,228,570	99.54			
Invalid/blank votes	33,127	0.46			
Total votes	7,261,697	100.00			
Registered voters/turnout	10,145,402	71.58			
Source: Wahlen in Deutschland

=== Alsace-Lorraine ===
Party	Votes	%	+/–	Seats	+/–
Clericals	82,164	45.96	+23.22	9	+4
Alsatian autonomists	52,791	29.53	+19.55	4	+4
Social Democratic Party	19,182	10.73	+10.46	1	+1
Alsace-Lorraine protesters	18,663	10.44	−49.02	1	−9
National Liberal Party	1,850	1.03	+0.30	0	0
German Reich Party	1,148	0.64	−6.01	0	0
German Conservative Party	1,055	0.59	New	0	0
Others	1,875	1.05	+0.87	0	0
Unknown	56	0.03	+0.03	0	0
Total	178,784	100.00	–	15	0
Valid votes	178,784	93.33			
Invalid/blank votes	12,771	6.67			
Total votes	191,555	100.00			
Registered voters/turnout	316,894	60.45			
Source: Wahlen in Deutschland
