= German Reform Party =

German Reform Party Deutsche Reformpartei
- Founded: 1880
- Dissolved: March 1914
- Merged into: German Social Reform Party (1894); German Völkisch Party (1914)
- Ideology: German nationalism Antisemitism
- Political position: Far-right

The German Reform Party (German: Deutsche Reformpartei or DRP) was a far-right political party active in the German Empire. It had antisemitism as its ideological basis.

The initial German Reform Party was established in 1880 by Alexander Pinkert, a Saxony-based antisemite, as a strongly antisemitic and palingenetic party, advocating the elimination of the Jews and the rebirth of Germany. However this initiative only lasted until 1891.

The later version of the DRP was established in either 1889 or 1890 by Otto Böckel and Oswald Zimmermann, who had been involved in the original party, under the name Antisemitic People's Party. It was based in Erfurt in Saxony. The Deutscher Antisemitenbund, an initiative of Wilhelm Pickenbach, was also included as part of the newly formed party. The new party's main aim was the repeal of Jewish emancipation.

The party contested the 1890 German federal election, winning four seats in the Reichstag. It increased its total to eleven in 1893. The party officially adopted the name of the DRP to fight the latter election.

In 1894, the DRP merged with the similarly antisemitic German Social Party to form the German Social Reform Party. The drive for the merger of the two parties had been led by Zimmermann and was unsuccessfully opposed by Böckel. Having lost his seat in 1903, Böckel faded from politics after the merger.

Following the dissolution of the merged party in 1900 Zimmermann returned to using the DRP moniker and continued to sit in the Reichstag until 1910. In March 1914, the DRP merged again with the German Social Party to form the German Völkisch Party (DvP).

== Election results ==
Reichstag
Date	Votes			Seats		Position	Size
Date	No.	%	± pp	No.	±	Position	Size
1903	138,344	1.46	New	6 / 397	New	Opposition	10th
1907	114,807	1.02	▼0.44	6 / 397	0	Opposition	▼11th
1912	60,758	0.50	▼0.52	3 / 397	▼2	Opposition	▼15th

== See also ==
- Political parties whose policies involve antisemitism
