= Ernst Bassermann =

German politician, born 1854

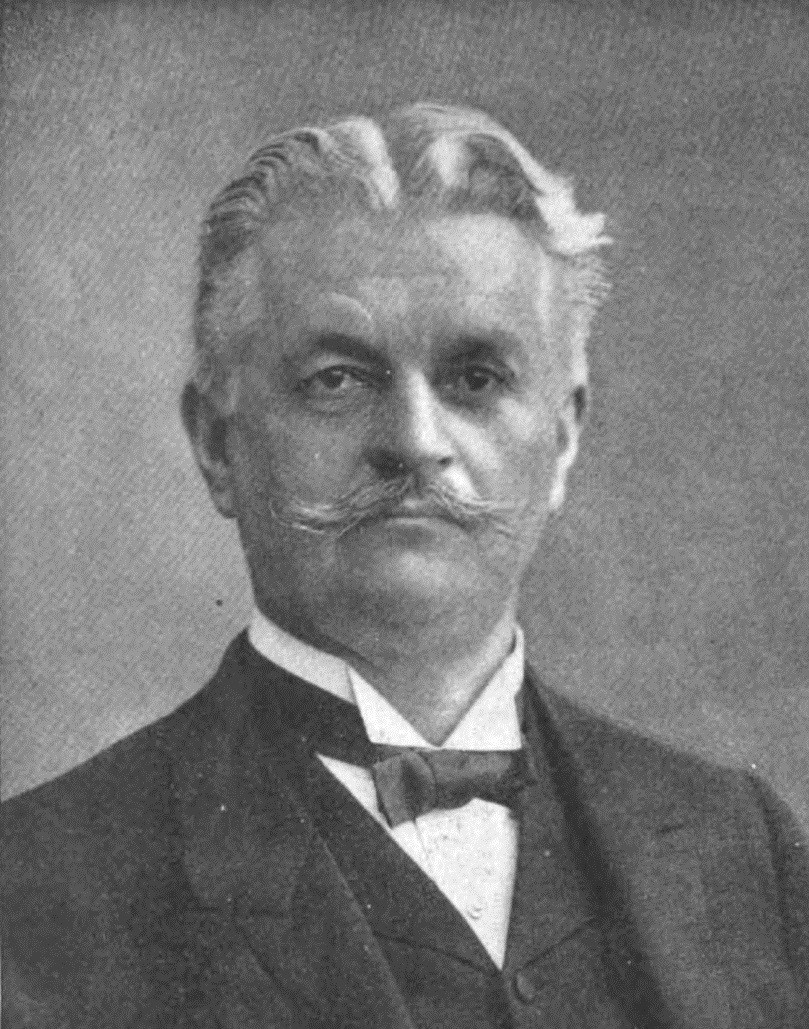
- Born: 26 July 1854; Wolfach/Grand Duchy of Baden
- Died: 24 July 1917 (aged 65); Baden-Baden
- Occupation: Politician

Ernst Bassermann (26 July 1854 - 24 July 1917 in Baden-Baden) was a German politician for the National Liberal Party.

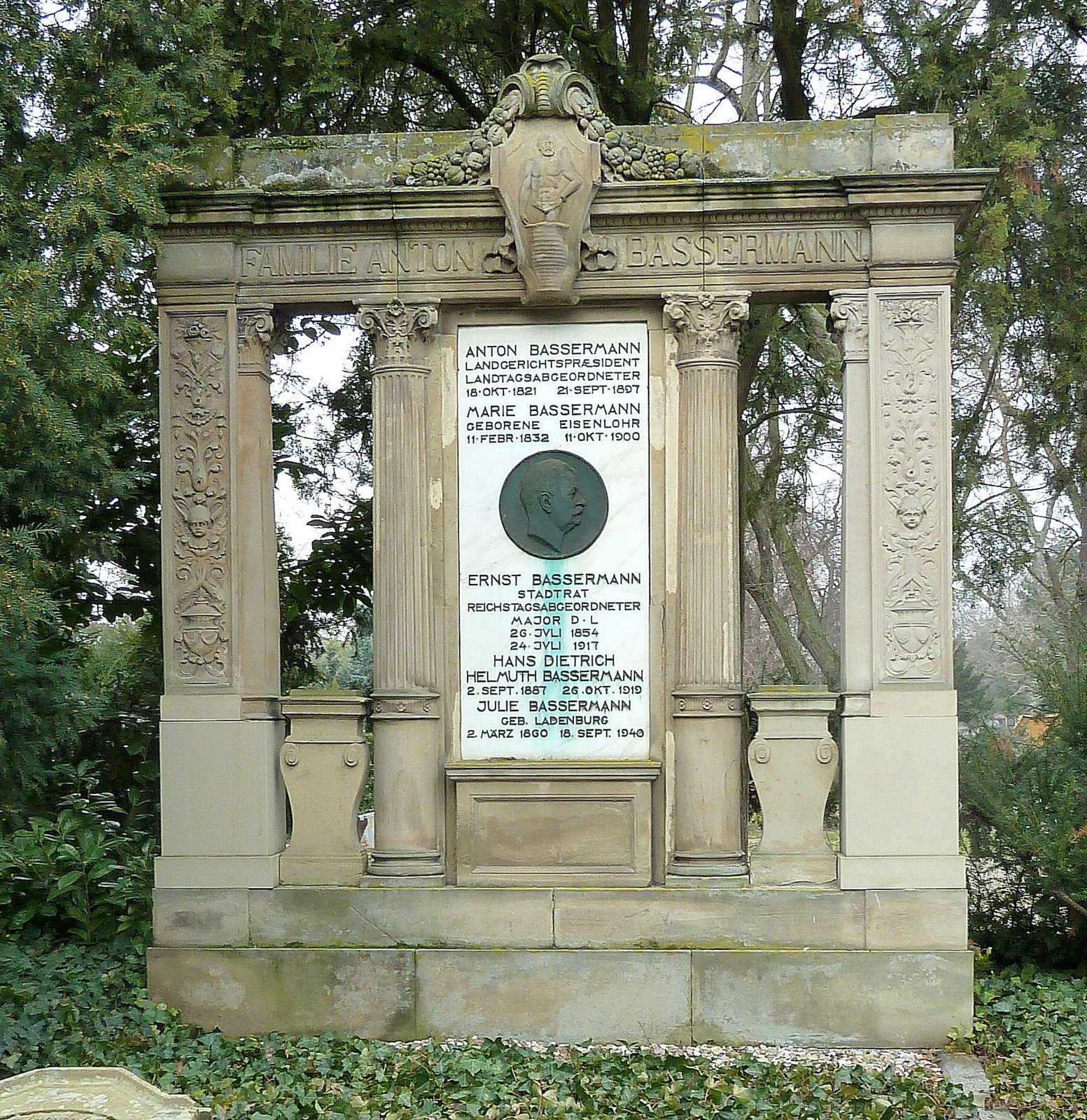
Bassermanns graveyard in Mannheim

Bassermann was born in Wolfach in the Grand Duchy of Baden. He studied German law at Heidelberg University and at Leipzig University.

In 1880 he became a lawyer in Mannheim.

From 1893 to 1917 he was member in German Reichstag. From 1905 to 1912 he was chairman of the National Liberal Party.

On July 12, 1881, he married Julie Ladenburg (1860-1940), daughter of German banker Carl Ladenburg in Mannheim. For the protestant lawyer Ernst Bassermann, the marriage opened up the opportunity to network among Mannheim's most prosperous circles. Three daughters and one son were born to the couple: at least two of the children would predecease their mother.
