= Alsace-Lorraine Party =

Political party in the German Empire

The Alsace-Lorraine Party (German: Elsass-Lothringen Partei; also known as Elsässer) was a political party in the German Empire.

== History ==
The party first contested national elections in 1874, winning 15 seats. It went on to win 15 seats in every election until 1890, when it was reduced to 10 seats. As more Alsatians emigrated to France, the party's support declined, and it never won more than 10 seats following the 1890 elections. When Alsace-Lorraine was returned to France after World War I, the party disappeared.

== Ideology ==
The party represented the autonomist views of the French-speaking population of Alsace-Lorraine. It protested against the German government's policies on Alsace-Lorraine, Catholics and other ethnic minorities, and was frequently allied with the Danish Party, the German-Hanoverian Party and the Polish Party.
