= German Conservative Party =

Right-wing political party of the German Empire

German Conservative Party Deutschkonservative Partei
- Founded: 7 June 1876
- Dissolved: 9 November 1918 (de facto), 1933 (de jure)
- Preceded by: Prussian Conservative Party
- Merged into: German National People's Party
- Headquarters: Berlin, Germany
- Newspaper: Neue Preußische Zeitung
- Ideology: Conservatism (German); Prussian nationalism; Antisemitism
- Political position: Right-wing
- Colors: Blue

The German Conservative Party (German: Deutschkonservative Partei, DkP) was a right-wing political party of the German Empire founded in 1876. It largely represented the wealthy landowning German nobility and the Prussian Junker class.

The party was a response to German unification, universal and equal franchise in national elections and rapid industrialization. It changed from a diffuse party of broad ideology into an interest party in Bismarckian Germany. In the early 1870s, Otto von Bismarck formed his majority with the base in the National Liberal Party which emphasized free trade and anti-Catholicism. Bismarck broke with them in the late 1870s, by which time the German Conservative Party and the Free Conservative Party had brought together the landed Junkers in the East and the rapidly growing industrial leadership in the major cities. They now became the main base of Bismarck's support and successive Chancellors down to 1918.

According to Robert M. Berdahl, this redirection illustrated "the slow and painful process by which the landed aristocracy adjusted to its new position in the capitalist 'class' system that had come to replace the precapitalist 'Estate' structure of Prussian society".

== Policies ==
The German Conservative Party was generally seen as representing the interests of the German nobility, the Junker landowners living east of the Elbe and the Evangelical Church of the Prussian Union and had its political stronghold in the Prussian Diet, where the three-class franchise gave rural elites and the wealthy disproportionate representation. Predominantly Prussian traditionalists, the party members had been skeptical at first about the 1871 unification of Germany—unlike the Free Conservative Party, a national conservative split-off dominated by business magnates unrestrictedly supporting the policies of Chancellor Otto von Bismarck.

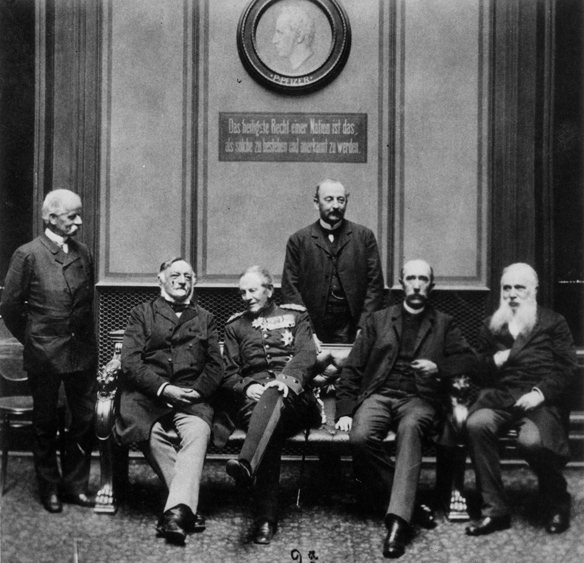
Members of the German Conservative Party's Reichstag Caucus (left to right): Rudolph Wichmann, Otto von Seydewitz, Helmuth von Moltke, Count Konrad von Kleist-Schmenzin, Otto von Helldorff-Bedra and Karl Gustav Ackermann

The policies of Old Conservatives like Field Marshal Helmuth von Moltke or Elard von Oldenburg-Januschau generally embraced support for the powers of the monarchy and opposition to economic liberalism and democratization, the introduction of electoral reform in Prussia, or true parliamentary government in Germany as a whole. Due to universal suffrage, on federal level the DKP had to face strikingly decreased significance. In the 1878 federal election, it gained 13.0% of the votes cast and entered the Reichstag parliament with 59 deputies. Afterwards, the party, which furthermore lost votes as Germans moved from rural areas to new industrial centers in the west (Ostflucht), forged an electoral alliance with the Christian Social Party under Adolf Stoecker, opportunistically embracing antisemitism.

Thomas Childers stated that the Conservatives were the first major party in Germany to incorporate antisemitism into its platform. The 1892 party program denounced a "demoralizing Jewish influence", but when this attitude failed to halt the party's fall in the polls this element was de-emphasized. Stoecker finally revoked the alliance in 1896.

Though predominantly Protestant, the DKP opposed the Kulturkampf, but supported Bismarck when during the Long Depression he began to implement protectionist policies by restricting grain imports from Russia and the United States. Following this, the DKP strongly opposed the New Course of his successor Leo von Caprivi. It also withdrew its confidence in Chancellor Bernhard von Bülow in 1909 when he tried to implement an inheritance tax reform; Bülow resigned following the reform's failure. The party supported Kaiser Wilhelm II's naval policies and Germany's arms race with the United Kingdom but initially kept its distance towards colonialism and the activists of the Pan-German League.

The party was dissolved following the fall of the monarchy in November 1918 and the German Revolution. Most of its supporters turned to the newly established German National People's Party. The Deutschkonservative Partei had no direct connection to the Deutsche Rechtspartei founded in 1946, which used the name Deutsche Konservative Partei (German Conservative Party) in parts of West Germany.

Members were for example Wilhelm von Rauchhaupt, Otto von Manteuffel, Ernst von Heydebrand und der Lasa, Kuno von Westarp, Hans Hugo von Kleist-Retzow, Philipp von Nathusius-Ludom, Elard von Oldenburg-Januschau, Hans von Kanitz, Heinrich von Salisch, Georg Oertel, Gustav von Goßler or Wilhelm Joachim von Hammerstein.

== Chairmen ==
- 1876-1892: Otto von Helldorff
- 1892–1911: Otto Karl Gottlob Freiherr von Manteuffel
- 1912–1918: Ernst von Heydebrand und der Lasa

== See also ==
- Conservatism in Germany

== Works cited ==
- Childers, Thomas (1983). The Nazi Voter: The Social Foundations of Fascism in Germany, 1919-1933. University of North Carolina Press. ISBN 0807815705.
- Kennedy, Paul (1982). The Rise of the Anglo-German Antagonism, 1860–1914. Allen & Unwin. ISBN 0049400606.
- Merriman, John (2010). A History of Modern Europe: from the Renaissance to the Present. W. W. Norton & Company. ISBN 9780393934335.
