= Reichstag deputies of the Kingdom of Saxony =

The Reichstag deputies of the Kingdom of Saxony were elected by male suffrage over the age of 25 across the Kingdom of Saxony from 1867 until the abolition of the Kingdom in 1918.

Following the North German Confederation Treaty the Kingdom of Saxony entered the North German Confederation in 1866. As a consequence, the Kingdom returned Deputies to the Reichstag. After the founding of the German Empire on 18 January 1871, the deputies were returned to the Reichstag of the German Empire. Following this Saxony participated in Reichstag elections from February 1867. Zittau returned a series of Reichstag Deputies until 1919 when the existing constituencies were scrapped.

== Reichstag of the North German Federation ==
Reichstag of the North German Federation
No.	Constituency	Reichstag Deputy Feb 1867	Party	Reichstag Deputy Aug 1867	Party
1	Zittau	Christian Riedel	(DFP)	Christian Riedel	(DFP)
2	Löbau	Heinrich Erdmann August von Thielau	(FKV)	Karl August Mosig von Aehrenfeld	(NLP)
3	Bautzen	Hermann von Salza und Lichtenau	(FKV)	Hermann von Salza und Lichtenau	(FKV)
4	Dresden New City	Friedrich Oskar von Schwarze	(Vin)	Friedrich Oskar von Schwarze	(BKV)
5	Dresden Old City	Franz Wigard	(DFP)	Franz Wigard	(DFP)
6	Dresden County	Wilhelm Schaffrath	(DFP)	Wilhelm Michael Schaffrath	(DFP)
7	Meissen	Ludwig von Zehmen	(FKV)	Ludwig von Zehmen	(FKV)
8	Pirna	Theodor Reuning	(Vin)	Hermann Theodor Schreck	(DFP)
9	Freiberg	Friedrich Raimund Sachsse	(Vin)	Friedrich Raimund Sachsse	(BKV)
10	Döbeln	Wilhelm Oehmichen	Lib	Wilhelm Oehmichen	(BKV)
11	Oschatz-Grimma	Theodor Günther	Lib	Theodor Günther	(BKV)
12	Leipzig City	Karl Georg von Wächter	Lib	Eduard Stephani	(NLP)
13	Leipzig County	Karl von Gerber	(Vin)	Ferdinand Goetz	Lib
14	Borna	Karl Wilhelm Gebert	(Vin)	Karl Wilhelm Gebert	(BKV)
15	Mittweida	Ludwig Haberkorn	Lib	Hans Blum	(NLP)
16	Chemnitz	Franz Xaver Rewitzer	(DFP)	Friedrich Wilhelm Emil Försterling	(LADAV)
17	Glauchau-Meerane	August Bebel	(SVP)	August Bebel	(SVP)
17	Zwickau	Reinhold Schraps	(SVP)	Reinhold Schraps	(SVP)
19	Stollberg-Schneeberg	Heinrich Minckwitz	(DFP)	Wilhelm Liebknecht	(SVP)
20	Marienberg	Eli Evans	(DFP)	Georg Curt von Einsiedel	(FKV)
21	Annaberg	Scipio Agricola Herbig	(Vin)	Karl Leistner	(NLP)
22	Auerbach	Julius Leonhard Heubner	(DFP)	Julius Leonhard Heubner	(DFP)
23	Plauen	Karl Braun	(Vin)	Franz August Mammen	(DFP)

Political parties in the 1867 elections North German Federation
Political orientation	Party		Seats Total Feb 1867	Seats Saxony Feb 1867	Seats Total Aug 1867	Seats Saxony Aug 1867
Conservative	Conservative Party (Prussia) (Konservative Partei)	(KP)	59	-	66	-
Conservative	Free Conservative Party (Freikonservative Vereinigung)	(FKV)	39	3	34	3
Conservative	Non aligned conservatives	Con	8	-	7	-
Liberal	National Liberal Party (Nationalliberale Partei)	(NLP)	80	-	81	4
Liberal	Vincke Fraktion	(Vin)	27	7	15	-
Liberal	Free Association (Freie Vereinigung)	(FV)	14	-	13	-
Liberal	German Progress Party (Deutsche Fortschrittspartei)	(DFP)	19	7	29	6
Liberal	Non aligned Liberals	Lib	11	4	9	1
	Bundesstaatlich-Konstitutionelle Vereinigung	(BKV)	18	-	21	5
Workers parties	Saxon People's Party (Sächsische Volkspartei)	(SVP)	2	2	3	3
Workers parties	Lasallean General German Workers' Association (Lasallean Allgemeiner Deutscher Arbeiterverein)	(LADAV)	-	-	1	1
Minorities	Polish Party		13	-	11	
Minorities	Danish		2	-	1	-
Others			5	-	4	-
Total			297	23	297	23

== Reichstag of the German Empire ==
=== 3 March, 1871: 1st Reichstag of the German Empire ===
The Reichstag election of 3 March, 1871 was the election of the members of the 1st Reichstag of the German Empire.

Reichstag of the German Empire
No.	Constituency	Reichstag Deputy 1871	Party
1	Zittau	Julius Pfeiffer	Lib
2	Löbau	Karl August Mosig von Aehrenfeld	(NLP)
3	Bautzen	Rudolf Thiel	(NLP)
4	Dresden New City	Friedrich Oskar von Schwarze	(LRP)
5	Dresden Old City	Franz Wigard	(DFP)
6	Dresden County	Karl Gustav Ackermann	(LRP)
7	Meissen	Karl Richard Hirschberg	(LRP)
8	Pirna	Arthur Eysoldt	(DFP)
9	Freiberg	Wilhelm Schaffrath	(DFP)
10	Döbeln	Wilhelm Oehmichen	(DFP)
11	Oschatz-Grimma	Theodor Günther	(LRP)
12	Leipzig City	Eduard Stephani	(NLP)
13	Leipzig County	Karl Birnbaum	(NLP)
14	Borna	Hermann Köchly	(DFP)
15	Mittweida	Karl Biedermann	(NLP)
16	Chemnitz	Richard Ludwig	(DFP)
17	Glauchau-Meerane	August Bebel	(SDAP)
17	Zwickau	Reinhold Schraps	(SDAP)
19	Stollberg-Schneeberg	Heinrich Minckwitz	(DFP)
20	Marienberg	Eduard Brockhaus	(NLP)
21	Annaberg	Carl Böhme	(DFP)
22	Auerbach	Otto Georgi	(NLP)
23	Plauen	Otto zu Münster-Langelage	(LRP)

Political parties in the 1871 German federal elections
Political orientation		Party		Seats Total 1871	Per cent	Seats Saxony Feb 1871	Per cent
Conservative		Conservative Party (Prussia) (Konservative Partei)	(KP)	53	13.9%	0	-
Conservative		German Reich Party (Deutsche Reichspartei)	(DRP)	39	10.2%	0	-
Conservative		Other conservative	Con	3	n/a	0	-
Liberal	Right-Liberal	Imperial Liberal Party (Liberale Reichspartei)	(LRP)	30	7.9%	5	21.7%
Liberal	Right-Liberal	National Liberal Party (Nationalliberale Partei)	(NLP)	119	31.1%	7	30.4%
Liberal		Other liberal	Lib	6	1.6%	1	4.3%
Liberal	Left-Liberal	German Progress Party (Deutsche Fortschrittspartei)	(DFP)	45	11.8%	8	34.8%
Liberal	Left-Liberal	German People's Party (1868) (Deutsche Volkspartei)	(DtVP)	1	0.3%	0	-
Catholic		Centre Party (Germany) (Zentrum Partei)	(ZP)	60	15.7%	0	-
Socialist		Social Democratic Workers' Party of Germany (Sozialdemokratische Arbeiterpartei Deutschlands)	(SDAP)	2	0.5%	2	8.7%
Socialist		General German Workers' Association (Allgemeiner Deutscher Arbeiterverein)	(ADAV)	0	-	0	-
Regional parties Minorities		German-Hanoverian Party (Deutsch-Hannoversche Partei)	(DHP)	7	1.8%	0	-
Regional parties Minorities		Polish Party		14	3.7%	0	-
Regional parties Minorities		Danish		1	0.3%	0	-
Others				2	0.5%	0	-
Total				297	100%	23	100%
