= Jesuit Law =

19th-century German law regarding Jesuits

The Jesuit Law (Jesuitengesetz) of 4 July 1872 forbade Jesuit institutions on the soil of the new German empire.

It was part of a broader intensification of church-state rivalry that emerged in the final decades of the nineteenth century in much of Europe as nationalism flourished, and secular states took a more assertive role in the daily lives of individuals. Within Germany, sources generally identify the resulting church-state struggle as the Kulturkampf (literally 'cultural struggle', and meaning a cultural battle or war).

== Content, political context and consequences ==
The core focus of the Kulturkampf laws went back to the individual states that together comprised the newly unified German Empire and which still enjoyed considerable autonomy within it. Apart from the so-called Pulpit Law, the Jesuit Law was one of very few Kulturkampf legislative measures enacted at a national level.

Some of the new laws of the 1870s, notably the Prussian school inspection law (Schulaufsichtsgesetz) and civil registration requirements for marriages, births and deaths, triggered state-church confrontation only as a side-effect. Unlike these measures, the Jesuit Law was from the start part of a struggle against the Jesuits, who were seen as the spearhead of Ultramontanism. By acknowledging the supremacy of Papal authority, the Jesuits contested the secular authority of Germany's imperial chancellor, Otto von Bismarck. Contemporary context for the Jesuit Law came from pre-emptive public campaigning against it by Roman Catholic traditionalists and the Protestant churches.

Within the national legislature (Reichstag), the majority coalition strengthened the draft legislation proposed by Bismarck. On 4 July 1872 the law, which concerned the Jesuits and Catholic religious orders, was promulgated. It proscribed the activities of Jesuit and associated orders on German soil. It empowered the government to impose residency bans on individual members of those orders, and to expel foreign members from the country.

The Jesuit Law created a strange political alliance. Chancellor Bismarck found himself supported by many Liberals in the Reichstag. Despite the secular instincts of nineteenth century liberalism there were indeed several prominent liberals who opposed the Jesuit Law on 19 July 1872 when the Reichstag voted on it. Opponents included Otto Bähr, Ludwig Bamberger and Eduard Lasker from the National Liberal Party. From the Progressive Party, Franz Duncker, Moritz Wiggers, Franz Wigard, Julius Dickert, Edward Banks, Ludwig Joseph Gerstner, Adolf Hermann Hagen, August Hausmann, Carl Herz, Moritz Klotz, Julius von Kirchmann and Wilhelm Schaffrath voted against it. They rejected the exceptionalism of the Jesuit Law, which constituted discriminatory restrictions on the fundamental rights of a single group.

A number of other liberals stayed away for the vote. Supporters of the Jesuit Law from the Progressive Party included Franz Ziegler, Albert Hänel and Eugen Richter. They were joined in the vote by the National Liberal assembly deputy, Karl Biedermann, who had opposed the law till the last minute but then, after much agonizing, changed his mind. Nevertheless, the overwhelming majority of the National Liberals and most of the Progressives voted in support of the measure.

Reichstag conservatives, alarmed to find themselves aligned with most of the liberals, were no doubt reassured by Bismarck's wry historical reference as he addressed the chamber, "We will not go to Canossa, not physically, nor in spirit".

One immediate result of the law was the emigration of numerous Jesuits across the border into Limburg in the Netherlands and Belgium.

As a political campaign, Bismarck's pursuit of the Kulturkampf was not a total success, and following the accession of Pope Leo XIII in 1878 the papacy lost some of its enthusiasm for Papal infallibility. During the 1880s much of the anti-church legislation of the previous decade was repealed. The Jesuit Law nevertheless remained in force throughout and beyond Bismarck's long term of office. The Catholic Centre Party and other organisations repeatedly demanded its repeal. An unintended consequence of the law was that it served as a focus around which Catholic political opposition to Bismarck coalesced. It was only in 1904 that the law was watered down. It was repealed in 1917 while the political class was focused on the First World War, and the civilian government, increasingly sidelined by the military establishment, saw an urgent need to nurture Centre Party support.

== See also ==
- Jesuit clause, Norwegian law banning Jesuits
- Suppression of the Society of Jesus
