= Friedrich Ludwig Leuschner =

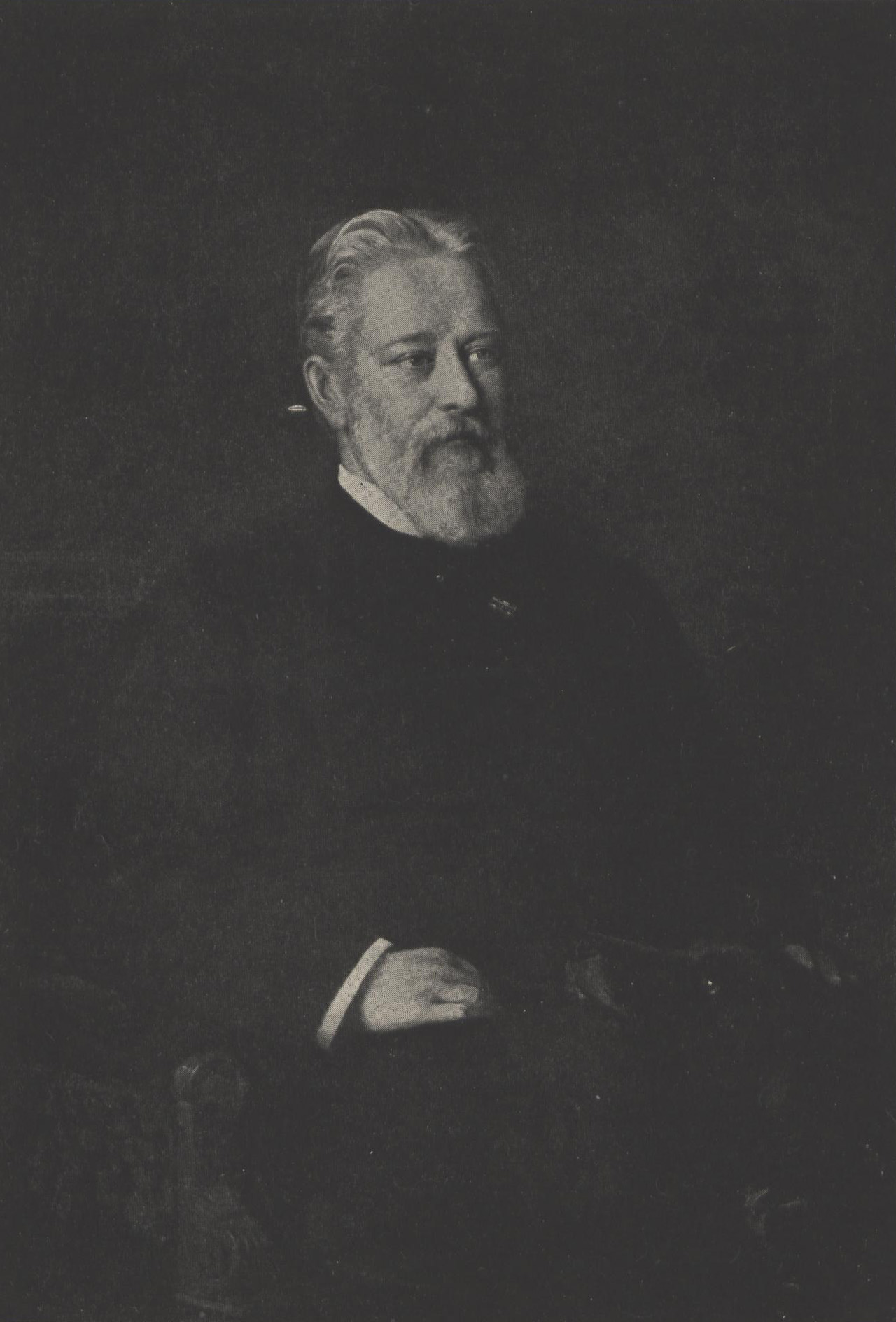
Ludwig Leuschner, undated photograph

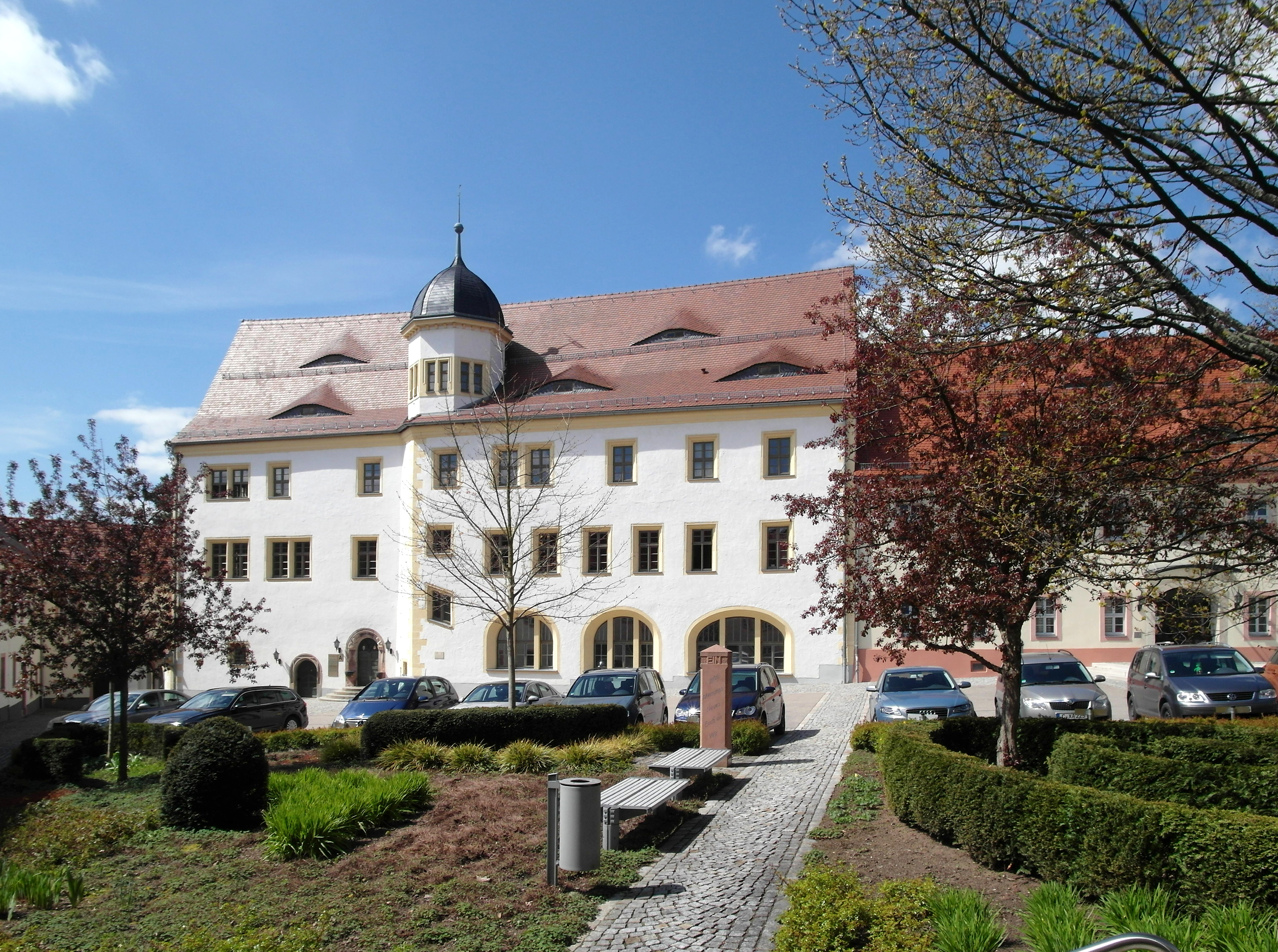
Manor house in Limbach-Oberfrohna

Friedrich Ludwig Leuschner (10 March 1824, Gräfenhainichen – 29 December 1889, Glauchau ) was a German landowner, businessman and politician.

In 1863 he acquired the manor house in Limbach-Oberfrohna, which subsequently became the town hall there. In 1868 he joined the Chamber of Commerce in Chemnitz and in 1870 was elected to the City Council in Glauchau.

He successfully stood for the Reichstag to represent the National Liberal Party for constituency No. 17, Glauchau-Meerane Reichstag constituency in 1881 and 1887.

Reichstag of the German Empire
Preceded by Wilhelm Bracke	Reichstag Deputy for Glauchau-Meerane; 1881–1884	Succeeded by Ignaz Auer
Preceded by Ignaz Auer	Reichstag Deputy for Glauchau-Meerane; 1887–1890	Succeeded by Ignaz Auer
