= Glauchau-Meerane Reichstag constituency =

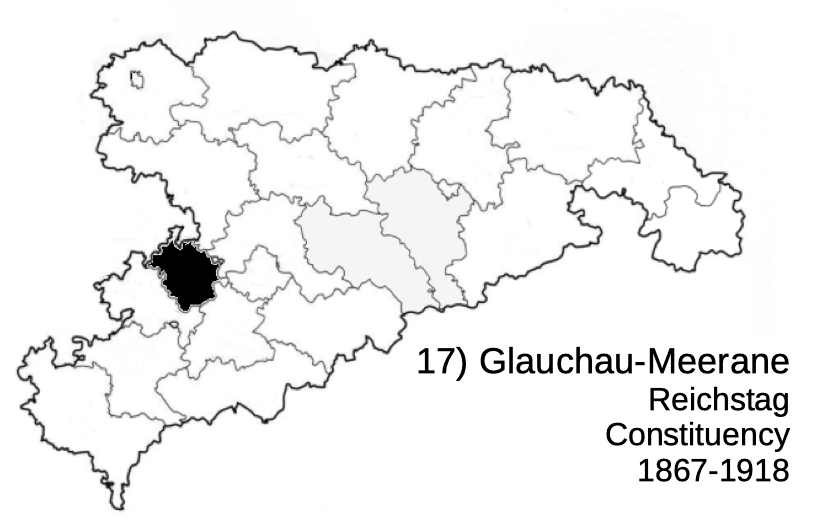

The Glauchau-Meerane Reichstag constituency was constituency No. 17 in the Kingdom of Saxony which returned a deputy to the German Reichstag. It included Glauchau, Meerane and Hohenstein-Ernstthal located in Chemnitzer Land.

Following the North German Confederation Treaty, the Kingdom of Saxony entered the North German Confederation in 1866. As a consequence, the Kingdom returned Deputies to the Reichstag of the North German Confederation. After the founding of the German Empire on 18 January 1871, the deputies were returned to the Reichstag of the German Empire. Following this, Saxony participated in Reichstag elections from February 1867. Glauchau-Meerane returned a series of Reichstag Deputies until 1919 when the existing constituencies were scrapped.

The deputies elected for the Glauchau-Meerane Reichstag constituency were as follows:

North German Federation
Election		Reichstag Deputy	Party
February 1867*	1st	August Bebel	Saxon People's Party
August 1867	2nd	August Bebel	Saxon People's Party
Reichstag of the German Empire
1871	1st	August Bebel	Social Democratic Workers' Party of Germany
1874	2nd	Wilhelm Bracke	Socialist Workers' Party of Germany (1875)
1877	3rd	Wilhelm Bracke	Socialist Workers' Party of Germany
1878	4th	Wilhelm Bracke	Socialist Workers' Party of Germany
1881	5th	Friedrich Ludwig Leuschner	National Liberal Party
1884	6th	Ignaz Auer	Socialist Workers' Party of Germany
1887	7th	Friedrich Ludwig Leuschner	National Liberal Party
1890	8th	Ignaz Auer	Socialist Workers' Party of Germany
1893	9th	Ignaz Auer	Social Democratic Party of Germany
1898	10th	Ignaz Auer	Social Democratic Party of Germany
1903	11th	Ignaz Auer	Social Democratic Party of Germany
1907	12th	Ignaz Auer*	Social Democratic Party of Germany
1912	13th	Hermann Molkenbuhr	Social Democratic Party of Germany
* died 10 April 1907
