= Löbau Reichstag constituency =

Constituency #2 in the Kingdom of Saxony

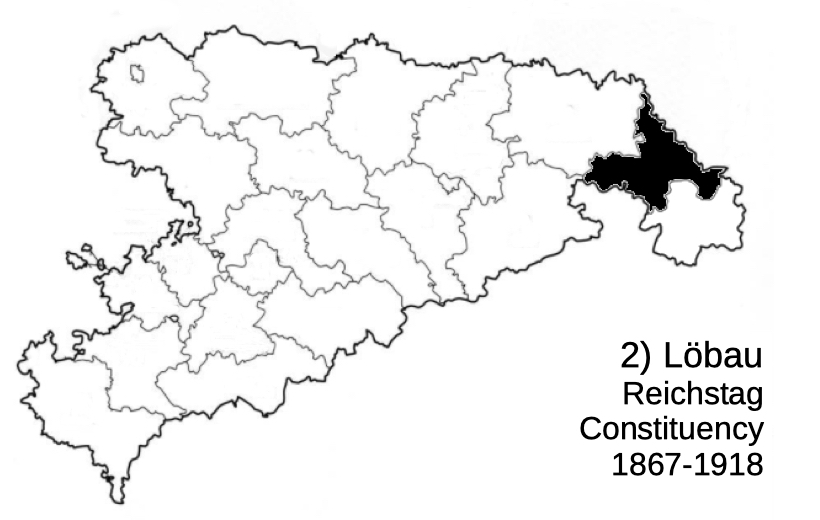

The Löbau Reichstag constituency was constituency No. 2 in the Kingdom of Saxony which returned a deputy to the German Reichstag. It is based upon the town of Löbau.

Following the North German Confederation Treaty the Kingdom of Saxon entered the North German Confederation in 1866. As a consequence, the Kingdom returned Deputies to the Reichstag. After the founding of the German Empire on 18 January 1871, the deputies were returned to the Reichstag of the German Empire. Following this Saxony participated in Reichstag elections from February 1867. Löbau returned a series of Reichstag Deputies until 1919 when the existing constituencies were scrapped.

The deputies elected for Löbau were as follows:

North German Federation
| Election | Reichstag Deputy | Party |
|---|---|---|
| February 1867* | Heinrich Erdmann August von Thielau | (FKV) |
| August 1867 | Karl August Mosig von Aehrenfeld | (NLP) |
Reichstag of the German Empire
| 1871 | Karl August Mosig von Aehrenfeld | (NLP) |
| 1874 | Julius Frühauf | (NLP) |
| 1877 | Julius Frühauf | (NLP) |
| 1878 | Emil Grützner | (DKP) |
| 1881 | Gustav Fährmann | (DFP) |
| 1884 | Gustav Fährmann | (DFP) |
| 1887 | Reinhold Hoffmann | (NLP) |
| 1890 | Reinhold Hoffmann | (NLP) |
| 1893 | Hermann Herzog | (FVg) |
| 1898 | Carl Adalbert Förster | (DKP) |
| 1903 | Karl Sindermann | (SDP) |
| 1907 | Carl Wilhelm August Weber | (NLP) |
| 1912 | Hermann Krätzig | (SDP) |
Key to political parties
| Freikonservative Partei – Free Conservative Party | | (FKV) |
| Nationalliberale Partei – National Liberal Party | | (NLP) |
| Deutschkonservative Partei – German Conservative Party | | (DKP) |
| Deutsche Fortschrittspartei – German Progress Party | | (DFP) |
| Freisinnige Vereinigung (FVg) – Free-minded People's Party (Germany) | | (FVg) |
| Sozialdemokratische Partei Deutschlands – Social Democratic Party of Germany | | (SDP) |
*In this election the constituency included Schirgiswalde and Ebersbach
