= German union =

German union may refer to:

- Modern Germany, the result of the 1990 Reunification of Germany
- The German Empire, the result of the 1871 Unification of Germany
- The unrealized aim of the 1848 Frankfurt Constitution
- The German Confederation, the result of the 1815 Congress of Vienna
- The North German Confederation, the result of the 1866 North German Confederation Treaty
- The Holy Roman Empire
- Trade unions in Germany
- CDU/CSU, also known as the Union, a political alliance in Germany

== See also ==
- German Union, a short-lived secret society during the Enlightenment era
