= Bautzen Reichstag constituency =

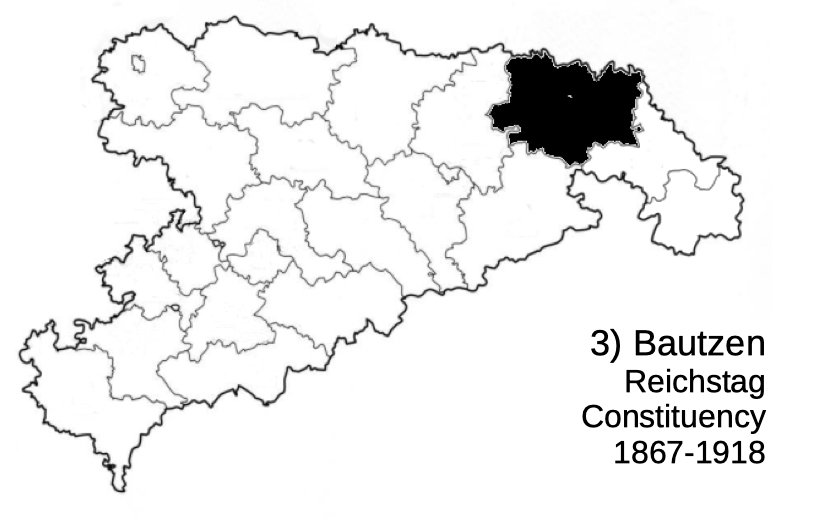

The Bautzen Reichstag constituency was constituency No. 3 in the Kingdom of Saxony which returned a deputy to the Reichstag of the German Empire. It is based upon the towns of Bautzen, Kamenz and Bischofswerda.

Following the North German Confederation Treaty the Kingdom of Saxon entered the North German Confederation in 1866. As a consequence, the Kingdom returned Deputies to the Reichstag. After the founding of the German Empire on 18 January 1871, the deputies were returned to the Reichstag of the German Empire. Following this Saxony participated in Reichstag elections from February 1867. Bautzen Reichstag constituency returned a series of Reichstag Deputies until 1919 when the existing constituencies were scrapped.

The deputies elected for Löbau were as follows:

North German Federation
Election	Reichstag Deputy	Party
February 1867*	Hermann von Salza und Lichtenau	(FKV)
August 1867	Hermann von Salza und Lichtenau	(FKV)
Reichstag of the German Empire
1871	Rudolf Thiel	(NLP)
1874	Hermann von Nostitz-Wallwitz	(Reich)
1877	Theodor Reich	(DKP)
1878	Theodor Reich	(DKP)
1881	Theodor Reich	(DKP)
1884	Theodor Reich	(DKP)
1887	Theodor Reich	(DKP)
1890	Georg Hempel	(DKP)
1893	Emil Heinrich Gräfe	(DRP)
1898	Heinrich Gräfe	(DRP)
1903	Heinrich Gräfe	(DRP)
1907	Heinrich Gräfe	(DRP)
1912	Heinrich Gräfe	(DRP)
*In this election the constituency included Schirgiswalde and Ebersbach
Key to political parties
Freikonservative Partei – Free Conservative Party		(FKV)
Nationalliberale Partei – National Liberal Party		(NLP)
Deutsche Reichspartei – German Reich Party (formerly FKV)		(Reich)
Deutschkonservative Partei – German Conservative Party		(DKP)
Deutsche Reformpartei – German Reform Party		(DRP)
