= Zittau Reichstag constituency =

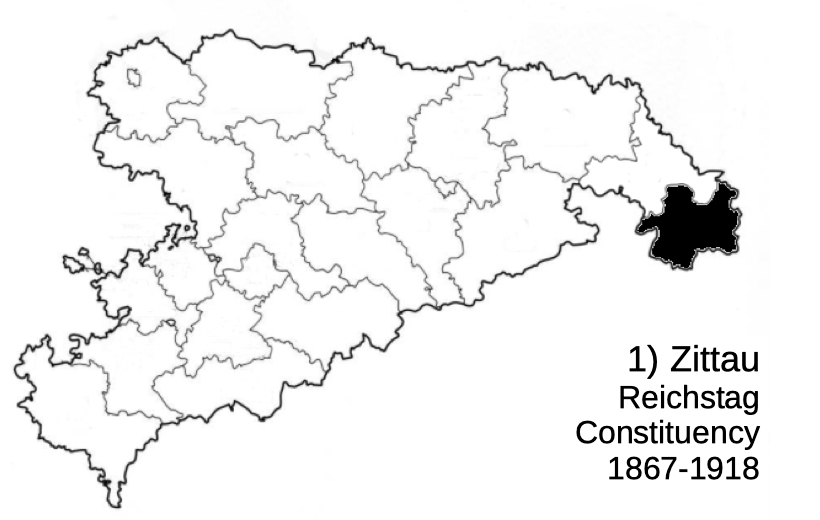

The Zittau Reichstag constituency was constituency No. 1 in the Kingdom of Saxony which returned a deputy to the German Reichstag. It is based upon the town of Zittau.

Following the North German Confederation Treaty the Kingdom of Saxon entered the North German Confederation in 1866. As a consequence, the Kingdom returned Deputies to the Reichstag. After the founding of the German Empire on 18 January 1871, the deputies were returned to the Reichstag of the German Empire. Following this Saxony participated in Reichstag elections from February 1867. Zittau returned a series of Reichstag Deputies until 1919 when the existing constituencies were scrapped.

The deputies elected for Zittau were as follows:

North German Federation
Election	Reichstag Deputy	Party
February 1867*	Christian Riedel	(DFP)
August 1867	Christian Riedel	(DFP)
Reichstag of the German Empire
1871	Julius Pfeiffer	(NLP)
1874	Julius Pfeiffer	(NLP)
1877	Julius Pfeiffer	(NLP)
1878	Hermann Rentzsch	(NLP)
1881	Louis Heinrich Buddeberg	(DFP)
1884	Louis Heinrich Buddeberg	(DFP)
1887	Louis Heinrich Buddeberg	(DFP)
1890	Louis Heinrich Buddeberg	(DFP)
1893	Louis Heinrich Buddeberg	(FVg)
1898	Edmond H. Fischer	(SDP)
1903	Edmond H. Fischer	(SDP)
1907	Louis Heinrich Buddeberg	(FVg)
1912	Edmond H. Fischer	(SDP)
Key to political parties
Deutsche Fortschrittspartei – German Progress Party		(DFP)
Nationalliberale Partei – National Liberal Party		(NLP)
Freisinnige Vereinigung (FVg) – Free-minded People's Party (Germany)		(FVg)
Sozialdemokratische Partei Deutschlands – Social Democratic Party of Germany		(SDP)
*In this election the constituency included Herrnhut and Reichenau
