= List of presidents of the Landtag of Saxony =

President of the Landtag of Saxony

In the 1831–1918 period, Saxony had a bicameral legislature. It consisted of the I Chamber and the II Chamber.

== President of Sächsicher Volkskammer ==
Name	Period	Party
Julius Fräßdorf	1918–1920	SPD

== Presidents of the Landtag of Saxony ==
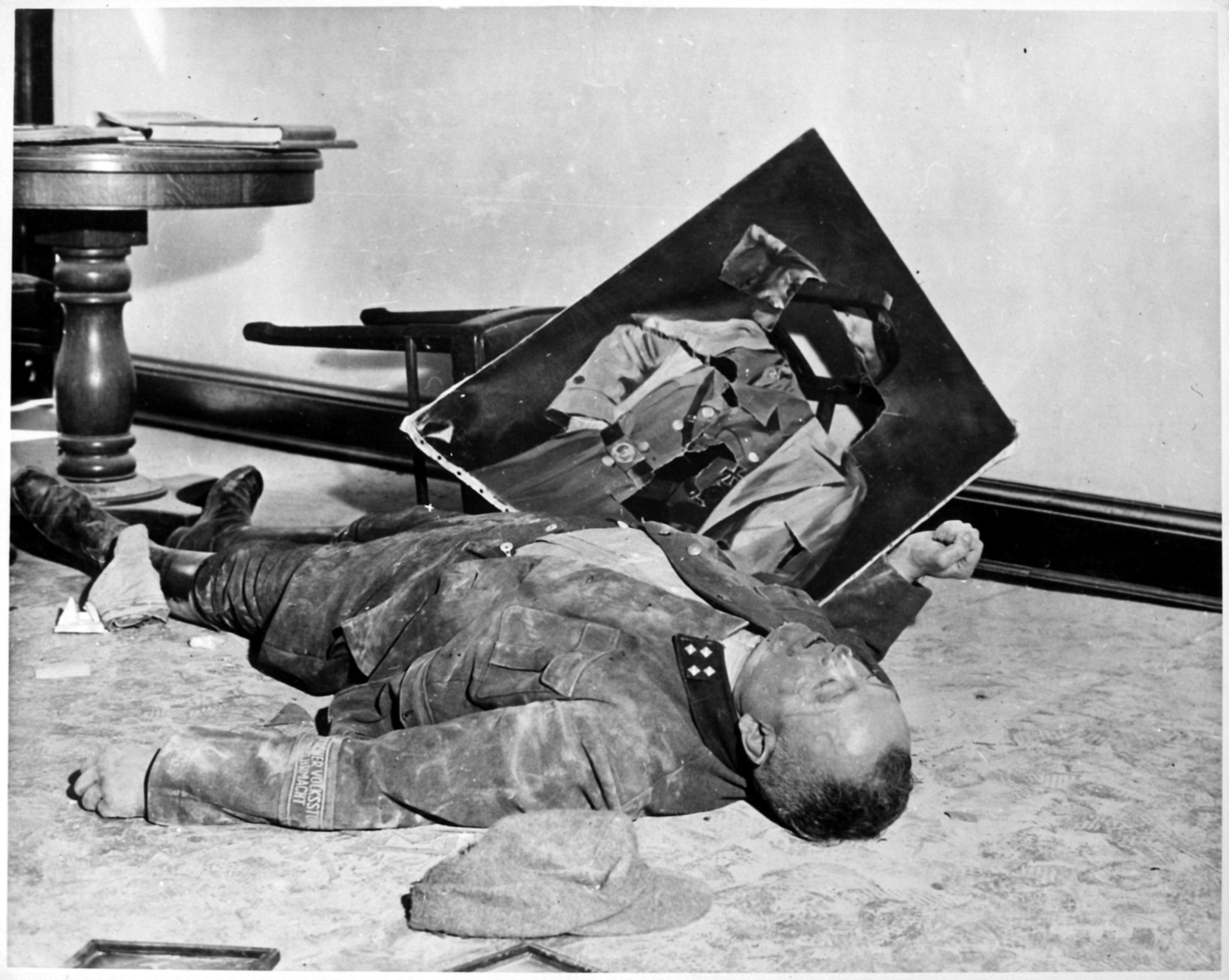
With a torn picture of his Führer beside his clenched fist, Walter Dönicke (* July 27, 1899; † April 19, 1945) lies on the floor of the city hall in Leipzig. He committed suicide rather than face U.S. Army troops who captured the city.

Name	Period	Party
Julius Fräßdorf	1920–1922	SPD
Max Winkler	1922–1926	SPD
Albert Schwarz	1926–1929	SPD
Kurt Weckel	1929–1932	SPD
August Eckardt	1932–1933	DNVP
Walter Dönicke	1933	NSDAP

== President of the Beratende Versammlung ==
Name	Period	Party
Otto Buchwitz	1946	SED

== Presidents of the Landtag of Saxony ==
Name	Period	Party
Otto Buchwitz	1946–1952	SED
Erich Iltgen	October 27, 1990–September 29, 2009	CDU
Matthias Rößler	September 29, 2009–Incumbent	CDU
