= Leipzig County Reichstag constituency =

The Leipzig County Reichstag constituency was constituency No. 13 in the Kingdom of Saxony which returned a deputy to the German Reichstag. It was based upon the rural area close to the city of Leipzig.

Following the North German Confederation Treaty the Kingdom of Saxon entered the North German Confederation in 1866. As a consequence, the Kingdom returned Deputies to the Reichstag. After the founding of the German Empire on 18 January 1871, the deputies were returned to the Reichstag of the German Empire. Following this Saxony participated in Reichstag elections from February 1867. Leipzig County Reichstag constituency returned a series of Reichstag Deputies until 1919 when the existing constituencies were scrapped.
