= Ignaz Auer =

German politician (1846–1907)

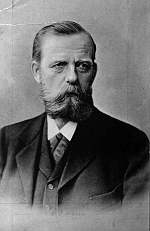
Ignaz Auer in c. 1895

Ignaz Auer (German: [ˈaʊɐ]; 19 April 1846 – 10 April 1907) was a German Social Democratic politician who served as a member of the German Reichstag for the Glauchau-Meerane Reichstag constituency intermittently between 1884 and 1906.

== Biography ==
He was born in Dommelstadl, Kingdom of Bavaria, in 1846, the son of a butcher, and joined the Social Democratic Workers' Party in 1866. In 1872, he moved to Berlin as a saddler, where he met and became friends with Eduard Bernstein, later an influential Marxist theoretician. He was an active participant in the unity congress of 1875 at Gotha, which founded the Social Democratic Party of Germany, (SPD) and later became Party Secretary of the SPD. Though on the right of the party, Auer was a pragmatist and viewed attempts to formulate social democratic reformism theoretically as harmful to its real political practice. He remarked to Bernstein during the controversy over the latter's theory of revisionism, "What you call for, my dear Ede, is something which one neither admits openly nor puts to a formal vote; one simply gets on with it." Auer died in Berlin on 10 April 1907.

Reichstag of the German Empire
Preceded by Friedrich Ludwig Leuschner	Reichstag Deputy for Glauchau-Meerane; 1884–1887	Succeeded by Friedrich Ludwig Leuschner
Preceded by Friedrich Ludwig Leuschner	Reichstag Deputy for Glauchau-Meerane; 1890–10 April 1907	Succeeded by Friedrich Ludwig Leuschner
