= Ines Saborowski =

German politician

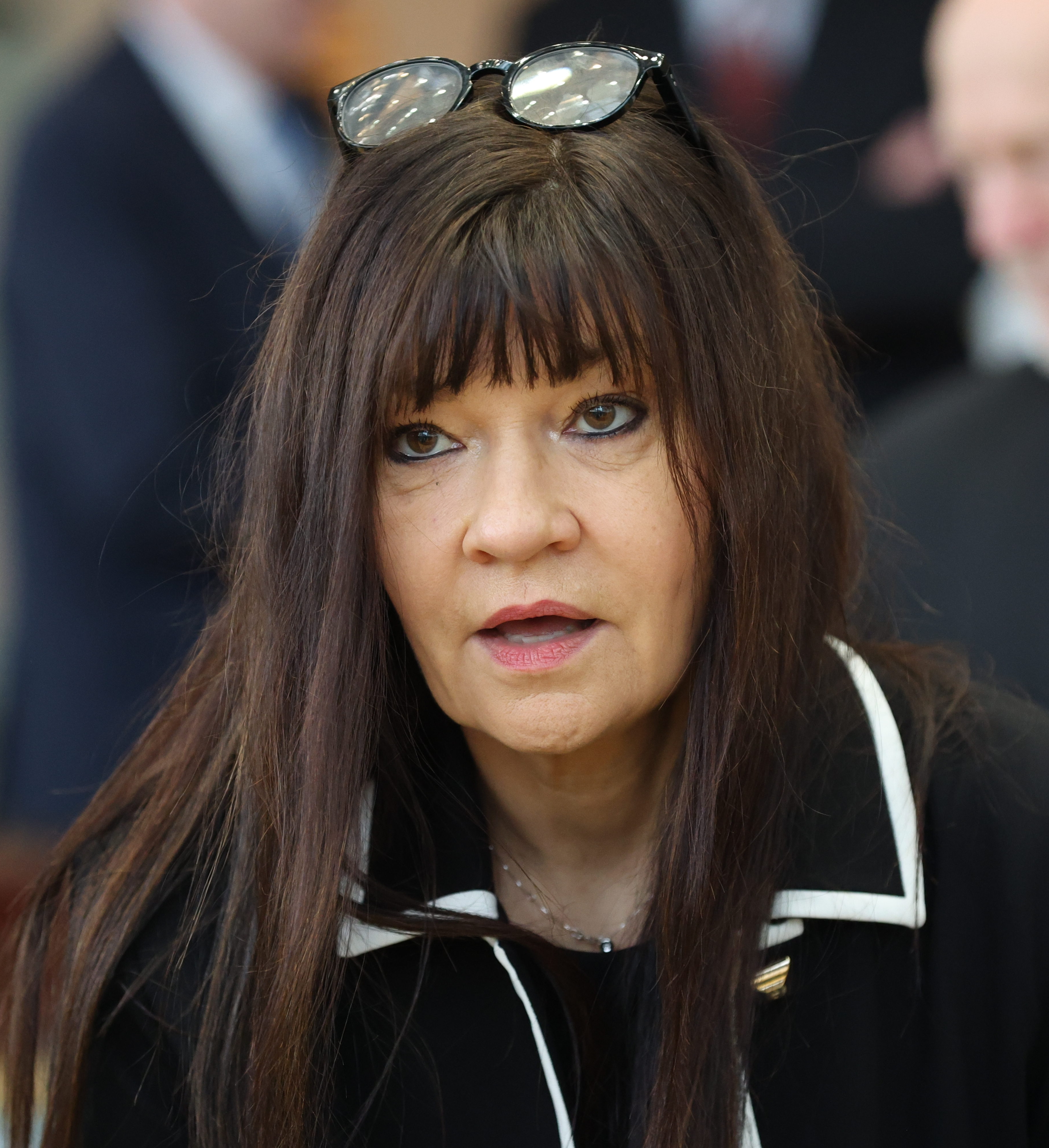
- Ines Saborowski in 2024

Member of the Landtag of Saxony
- Incumbent
- Assumed office 2009

Personal details
- Born: Ines Saborowski-Richter; 29 July 1967 (age 59) Chemnitz, Germany
- Party: CDU Saxony

Ines Saborowski (née Saborowski-Richter; born 29 July 1967) is a German politician from the Christian Democratic Union (CDU). She has been a member of the Landtag of Saxony since 2009. Since 1 October 2024, she has been First Vice President of the Landtag.

== Biography ==
Ines Saborowski attended the Johannes R. Becher and Valentina Tereshkova high schools from 1974 to 1984 and studied at the Walter Krämer medical school from 1984 to 1987. Since 1988, she has worked as a medical laboratory technician at the German Red Cross blood donation service in Chemnitz.

Ines Saborowski lives in Chemnitz, is divorced and has a daughter.

== Political career ==
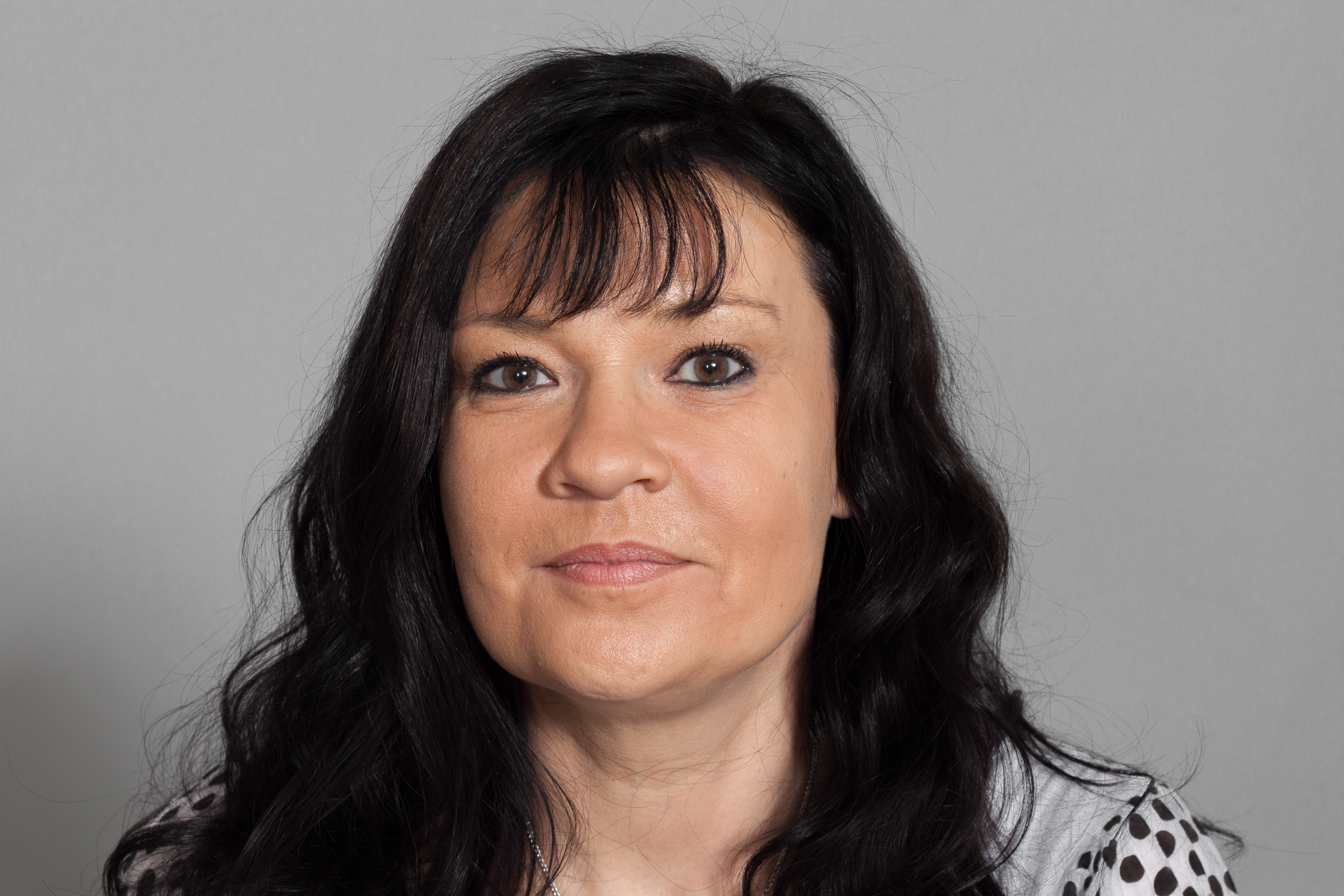
Ines Saborowski, 2013

Ines Saborowski remained unaffiliated with any political party in East Germany and joined the CDU in 1999. In the 2004 local elections, she was elected to the Chemnitz City Council for constituency 3 (Gablenz, Yorckgebiet, Adelsberg, Kleinolbersdorf-Altenhain) and is a member of the CDU parliamentary group's executive committee. Within her party, she is a member of the state executive committee of the Christian Democratic Workers' Association (CDA) and of the Chemnitz CDU district executive committee.

In the 2009 Saxony state election, she was elected to the Landtag of Saxony as a direct candidate in the Chemnitz 3 constituency. She was again directly elected to in the same constituency in the 2014, 2019 and 2024 elections. She serves as a member of the Committee on Schools and Sport and the Committee on Social Affairs and Consumer Protection.
