= Kurier für Niederbayern =

Lower Bavarian daily newspaper

The Kurier für Niederbayern was a Lower Bavarian daily self-described as a "paper for national and social politics". It was later edited by Heinrich Himmler, who described it as a "folk journal". Himmler was selected for the editorial role by Gregor Strasser, a member of the "völkisch" National Socialist Freedom Movement, to serve as his deputy in the Reichstag.

Since 1848 it was published by J.F. Rietsch in Landshut. It was one of the newspapers that published attack articles against Redemptorists, an order that had been banned in Germany by an extension of the Jesuits Law in 1873. Under Himmler's control it became an antisemitic propaganda paper.

== See also ==
- Kulturkampf
