= List of presidents of the II Chamber of the Landtag of Saxony =

The president of the II Chamber of the Landtag of Saxony was the presiding officer of the lower chamber of that legislature.

| Name | Period |
|---|---|
| August Friedrich Wilhelm von Leyßer | 1833–1834 |
| Carl Friedrich Reiche-Eisenstuck | 1836–1837 |
| Karl Heinrich Haase | 1839–1843 |
| Karl Braun | 1845–1847 |
| Franz Xaver Rewitzer | 1848 |
| Adolph Ernst Hensel | 1849 |
| Emil Cuno | 1849–1850 |
| Karl Heinrich Haase | 1850–1858 |
| Ludwig Haberkorn | 1859–1870 |
| Wilhelm Schaffrath | 1871–1874 |
| Ludwig Haberkorn | 1875–1890 |
| Gustav Ackermann | 1891–1898 |
| Paul Mehnert | 1899–1908 |
| Paul Vogel | 1909–1918 |
