= German Emperor =

Title of German monarchs from 1871 to 1918

Emperor of the German Empire
- Deutscher Kaiser
- Imperial
- Coat of arms

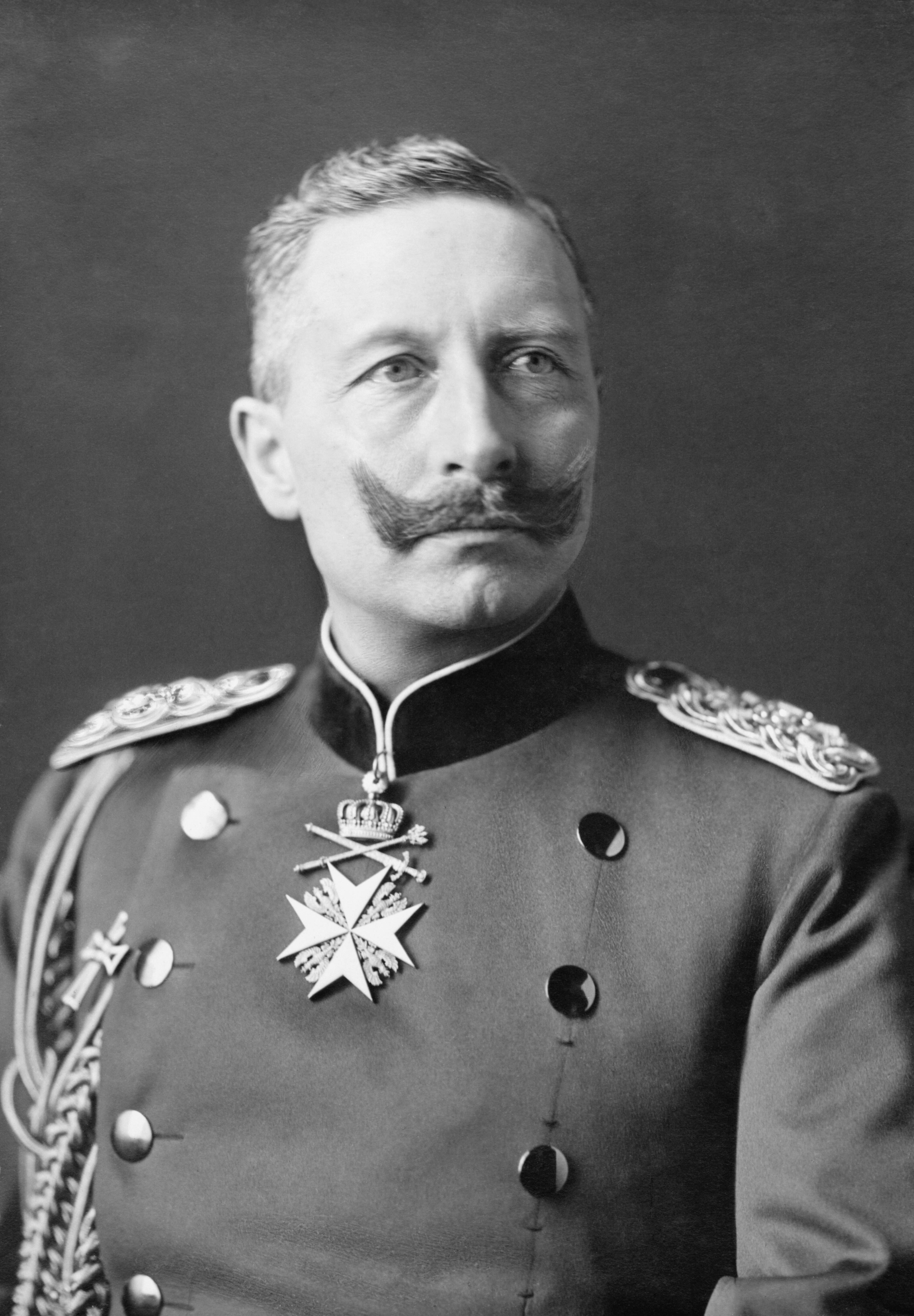
- Last to reign Wilhelm II; 15 June 1888 – 9 November 1918

Details
- Style: His Imperial Majesty
- First monarch: Wilhelm I
- Last monarch: Wilhelm II
- Formed: 1 January 1871; 155 years ago
- Abolished: November 28, 1918; 107 years ago
- Residences: Berlin Palace; New Palace, Potsdam
- Appointer: Hereditary
- Pretender: Georg Friedrich

The German Emperor (German: Deutscher Kaiser, pronounced [ˈdɔʏtʃɐ ˈkaɪzɐ]) was the official title of the head of state and hereditary ruler of the German Empire. A specifically chosen term, it was introduced with the 1 January 1871 constitution and lasted until the abdication of Wilhelm II was announced on 9 November 1918. The Holy Roman Emperor is sometimes also called "German Emperor" when the historical context is clear, as derived from the Holy Roman Empire's official name of "Holy Roman Empire of the German Nation" from 1512.

Following the revolution of 1918, the head of state was the president of the Reich (German: Reichspräsident), beginning with Friedrich Ebert.

== German Empire (1848–1849) ==
In the wake of the revolutions of 1848 and during the German Empire (1848–1849), King Friedrich Wilhelm IV of Prussia was offered the title "Emperor of the Germans" (German: Kaiser der Deutschen) by the Frankfurt Parliament in 1849, but declined as it was “not the Parliament's to give.” Friedrich Wilhelm believed that only the German princes had the right to make such an offer, in accordance with the traditions of the Holy Roman Empire.

== Creation ==
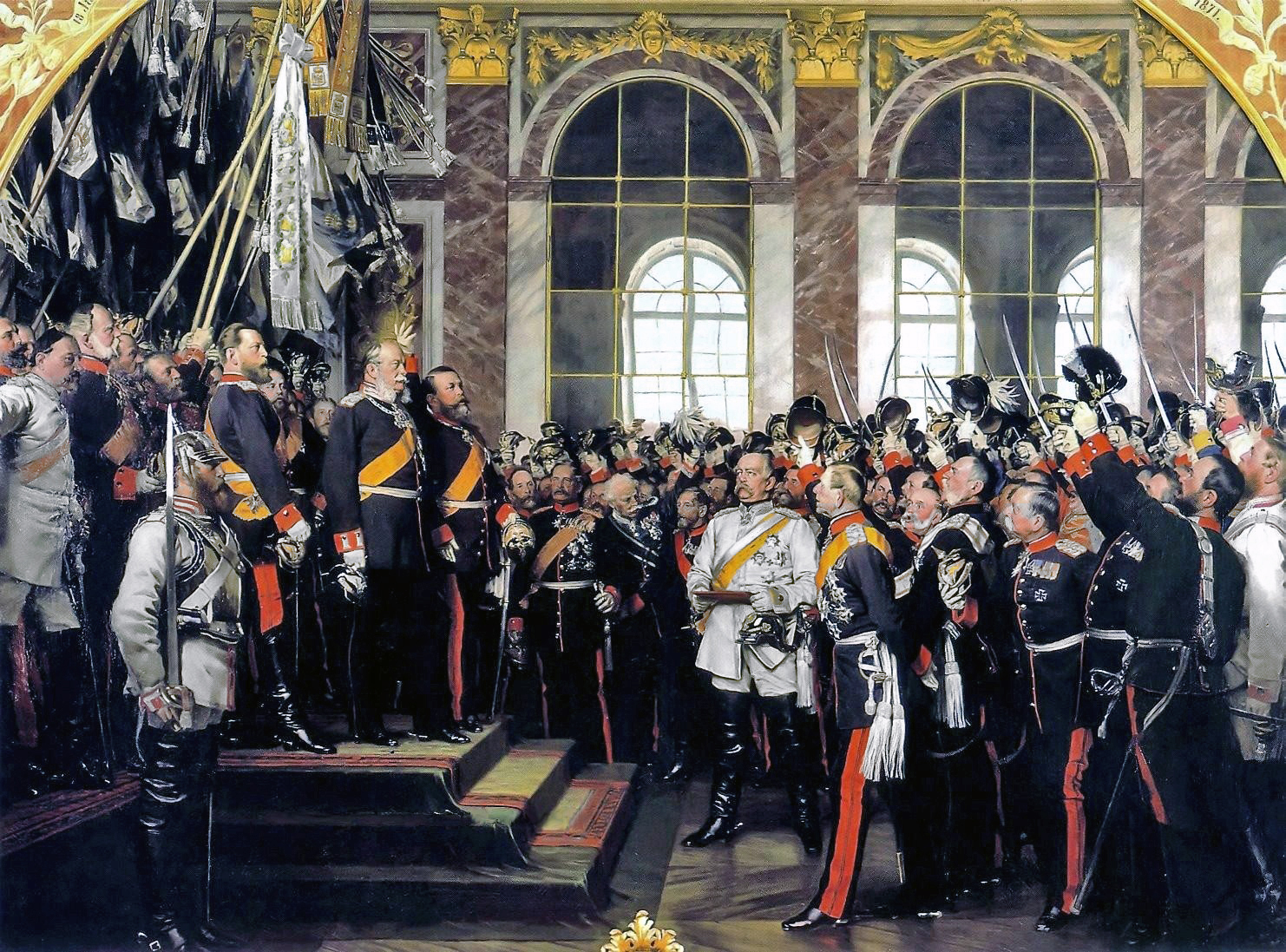
Proclamation of Wilhelm I as German Emperor in the Hall of Mirrors in Versailles, France (painting by Anton von Werner)

The title was carefully chosen by Otto von Bismarck, Minister President of Prussia and Chancellor of the North German Confederation, after discussion which continued until the proclamation of King Wilhelm I of Prussia as emperor at the Palace of Versailles during the Siege of Paris. Wilhelm accepted this title grudgingly on 18 January, having preferred "Emperor of Germany" (German: Kaiser von Deutschland). However, that would have signaled a territorial sovereignty unacceptable to the South German monarchs, as well as a claim to lands outside his realm (Austria, Switzerland, Luxembourg, etc.).

Kaiserstandarte (Emperor's standard) of 1871

"Emperor of the Germans", as had been proposed at the Frankfurt Parliament in 1849, was ruled out by Wilhelm as he considered himself a king who ruled by divine right and chosen "By the Grace of God", not by the people in a popular monarchy. But more in general, Wilhelm was unhappy about a crown that looked artificial (like Napoléon's), having been created by a constitution. He was afraid that it would overshadow the Prussian crown.

Since 1867, the presidency (Bundespräsidium) of the North German Confederation had been a hereditary office of the kings of Prussia. The new constitution of 1 January 1871, following Reichstag and Bundesrat decisions on 9/10 December, transformed the North German Confederation (German: Norddeutscher Bund) into the German Empire (German: Deutsches Reich). This empire was a federal monarchy; the emperor was head of state and president of the federated monarchs (the kings of Bavaria, Württemberg, Saxony, the grand dukes of Baden, Mecklenburg-Schwerin, Hesse, among others, as well as the principalities, duchies and of the free cities of Hamburg, Lübeck and Bremen).

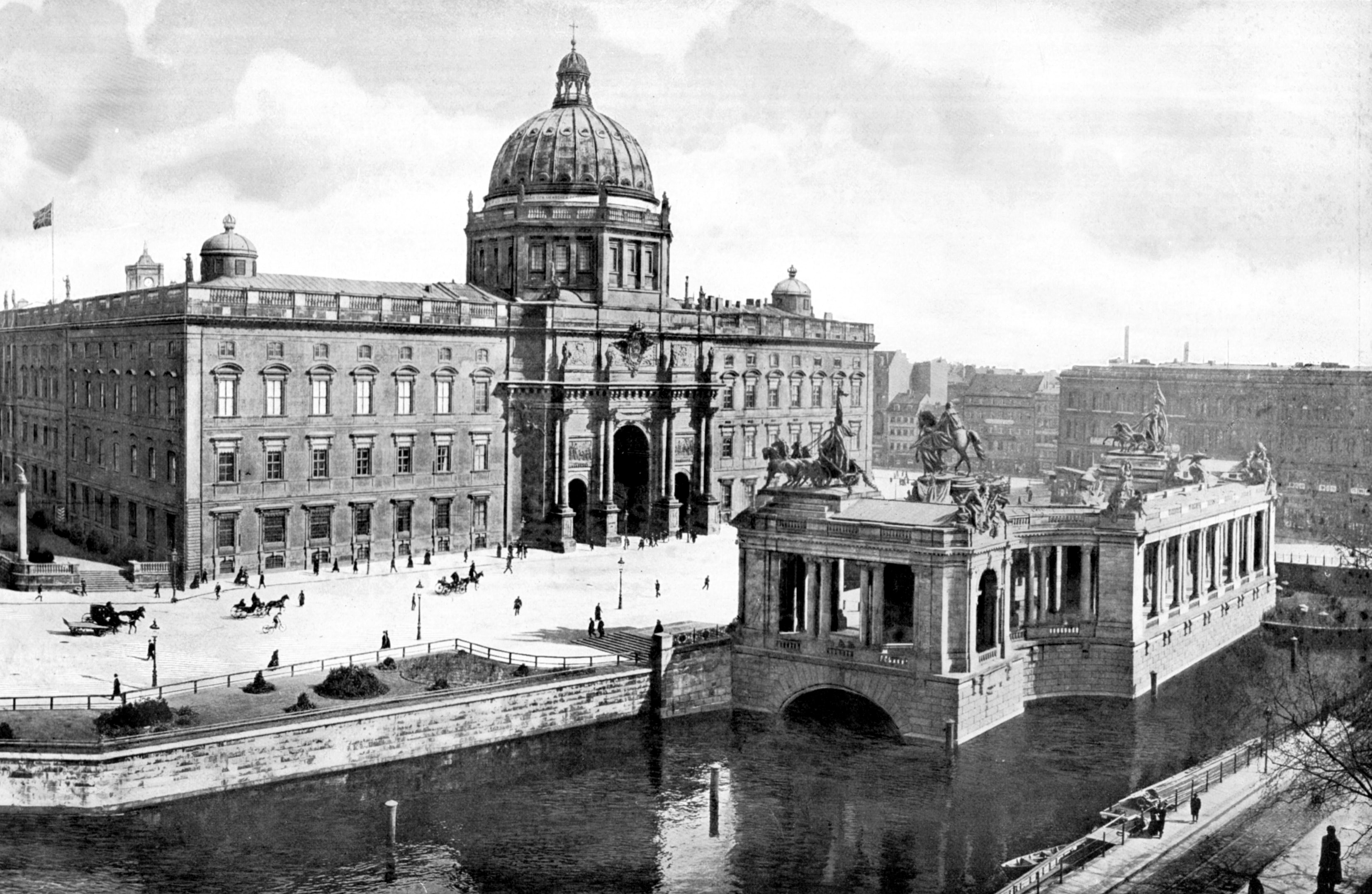
Berlin Palace, the main residence of the German emperors

Under the imperial constitution, the empire was a federation of states under the permanent presidency of the king of Prussia. Thus, the imperial crown was directly tied to the Prussian crown—something Wilhelm II discovered in the aftermath of World War I. He erroneously believed that he ruled the empire in personal union with Prussia. With the war's end, he conceded that he could not remain emperor, but initially thought he could at least retain his Prussian crown. However, his last chancellor, Prince Max of Baden, knew this was legally impossible, and in order to keep control of the growing revolutionary movement in Berlin, unilaterally announced Wilhelm's abdication of both thrones on 9 November, two days before the Armistice. Wilhelm realized his situation was untenable when the army made clear it would not defend his throne. Accepting the fait accompli, Wilhelm went into exile in the Netherlands later that night. It was not until 28 November that Wilhelm formally acknowledged he had lost both of his crowns for good and gave up all claims to "the throne of Prussia and to the German imperial throne connected therewith."

== Full titles ==
The German Emperors had an extensive list of titles and claims that reflected the geographic expanse and diversity of the lands ruled by the House of Hohenzollern.

=== Wilhelm I ===
His Imperial and Royal Majesty Wilhelm I, By the Grace of God, German Emperor and King of Prussia; Margrave of Brandenburg, Burgrave of Nuremberg, Count of Hohenzollern; sovereign and supreme Duke of Silesia and of the County of Glatz; Grand Duke of the Lower Rhine and of Posen; Duke of Saxony, of Westphalia, of Angria, of Pomerania, Lunenburg, Holstein and Schleswig, of Magdeburg, of Bremen, of Guelders, Cleves, Jülich and Berg, Duke of the Wends and the Kassubes, of Crossen, Lauenburg and Mecklenburg; Landgrave of Hesse and Thuringia; Margrave of Upper and Lower Lusatia; Prince of Orange; Prince of Rügen, of East Friesland, of Paderborn and Pyrmont, of Halberstadt, Münster, Minden, Osnabrück, Hildesheim, of Verden, Cammin, Fulda, Nassau and Moers; Princely Count of Henneberg; Count of Mark, of Ravensberg, of Hohenstein, Tecklenburg and Lingen, of Mansfeld, Sigmaringen and Veringen; Lord of Frankfurt.

=== Frederick III ===
His Imperial and Royal Majesty Frederick III, By the Grace of God, German Emperor and King of Prussia, Margrave of Brandenburg, Burgrave of Nuremberg, Count of Hohenzollern, Duke of Silesia and of the County of Glatz, Grand Duke of the Lower Rhine and of Posen, Duke of Saxony, of Angria, of Westphalia, of Pomerania and of Lunenburg, Duke of Schleswig, of Holstein and of Crossen, Duke of Magdeburg, of Bremen, of Guelderland and of Jülich, Cleves and Berg, Duke of the Wends and the Kashubians, of Lauenburg and of Mecklenburg, Landgrave of Hesse and in Thuringia, Margrave of Upper and Lower Lusatia, Prince of Orange, of Rugen, of East Friesland, of Paderborn and of Pyrmont, Prince of Halberstadt, of Münster, of Minden, of Osnabrück, of Hildesheim, of Verden, of Kammin, of Fulda, of Nassau and of Moers, Princely Count of Henneberg, Count of the Mark, of Ravensberg, of Hohenstein, of Tecklenburg and of Lingen, Count of Mansfeld, of Sigmaringen and of Veringen, Lord of Frankfurt.

=== Wilhelm II ===
His Imperial and Royal Majesty Wilhelm II, By the Grace of God, German Emperor and King of Prussia, Margrave of Brandenburg, Burgrave of Nuremberg, Count of Hohenzollern, Duke of Silesia and of the County of Glatz, Grand Duke of the Lower Rhine and of Posen, Duke of Saxony, of Angria, of Westphalia, of Pomerania and of Lunenburg, Duke of Schleswig, of Holstein and of Crossen, Duke of Magdeburg, of Bremen, of Guelderland and of Jülich, Cleves and Berg, Duke of the Wends and the Kashubians, of Lauenburg and of Mecklenburg, Landgrave of Hesse and in Thuringia, Margrave of Upper and Lower Lusatia, Prince of Orange, of Rugen, of East Friesland, of Paderborn and of Pyrmont, Prince of Halberstadt, of Münster, of Minden, of Osnabrück, of Hildesheim, of Verden, of Kammin, of Fulda, of Nassau and of Moers, Princely Count of Henneberg, Count of the Mark, of Ravensberg, of Hohenstein, of Tecklenburg and of Lingen, Count of Mansfeld, of Sigmaringen and of Veringen, Lord of Frankfurt.

== German Emperors (1871–1918) ==
Name	Lifespan	Reign start	Reign end	Notes	Family	Image
Wilhelm I: the Great	22 March 1797 – 9 March 1888 (aged 90)	1 January 1871	9 March 1888 (17 years, 69 days)	Held the presidency of the Confederation (Bundespräsidium) in the North German Confederation from 1867 (such title being retained as a subsidiary title following the creation of the German Empire).	Hohenzollern	Wilhelm I, German Emperor
Frederick III	18 October 1831 – 15 June 1888 (aged 56)	9 March 1888	15 June 1888 (99 days)	Son of Wilhelm I	Hohenzollern	Frederick III, German Emperor
Wilhelm II	27 January 1859 – 4 June 1941 (aged 82)	15 June 1888	28 November 1918 (abdicated) (30 years, 167 days)	Grandson of Wilhelm I Son of Friedrich III	Hohenzollern	Wilhelm II, German Emperor

== See also ==
- Crown of Wilhelm II
- German State Crown
- History of Germany
- Holy Roman Emperor
- List of monarchs of Germany
- List of Prussian monarchs
- Family tree of the German monarchs
- Year of the Three Emperors
- Monarchy of Germany (1871-1918)
