= Chemnitz 3 =

State electoral district of Germany

11: Chemnitz 3
- Electoral district for the Landtag of Saxony
- Chemnitz 3 in 2024
- District: Chemnitz
- Electorate: 59,892 (2024)
- Major settlements: Part of the city of Chemnitz

Current electoral district
- Party: CDU
- Member: Ines Saborowski

Chemnitz 3 is an electoral constituency (German: Wahlkreis) represented in the Landtag of Saxony. It elects one member via first-past-the-post voting. Under the constituency numbering system, it is designated as constituency 11. It is within the district of Chemnitz.

== Geography ==
The constituency comprises the districts of Adelsberg, Altchemnitz, Bernsdorf, Einsiedel, Erfenschlag, Euba, Harthau, Helbersdorf, Kapellenberg, Kappel, Klaffenbach, Kleinolbersdorf-Altenhain, Markersdorf, Reichenhain, and Schönau within the city of Chemnitz.

There were 59,892 eligible voters in 2024.

== Members ==
Election	Member	Party	%
2014	Ines Saborowski	CDU	36.0
2019	Ines Saborowski	CDU	31.8
2024	Ines Saborowski	CDU	38.2

== Election results ==
=== 2024 election ===
State election (2024): Chemnitz 3
Notes:	Blue background denotes the winner of the electorate vote. Pink background denotes a candidate elected from their party list. Yellow background denotes an electorate win by a list member, or other incumbent. A ✓ or ✗ denotes status of any incumbent, win or lose respectively.						
Party	Candidate	Votes	%	±%	Party votes	%	±%
CDU	✓ Ines Saborowski	16,579	38.2	▲6.4	14,338	32.6	▼1.11
AfD	Harald Steffen Wegert	14,946	34.4	▲7.9	12,178	27.7	▲0.9
BSW					6,889	15.7	
SPD	Falk Hammermüller	3,743	8.6	▼1.8	3,424	7.8	▼0.9
Left	Markus Adam	3,285	7.6	▼6.9	1,824	4.1	▼8.1
FW	Bernhard Heinrich Sünder	1,861	4.3	▲0.5	563	1.3	▼0.8
Greens	Coretta Storz	1,625	3.7	▼4.0	1,691	3.8	▼3.5
FDP	Mandy Straube	760	1.8	▼1.6	367	0.8	▼2.8
Freie Sachsen	K. Martin Kohlmann	592	1.4		1,375	3.1	
PARTEI					391	0.9	▼0.8
APT					376	0.9	
BD					102	0.2	
Values					100	0.2	
dieBasis					89	0.2	
Bündnis C					82	0.2	
V-Partei3					60	0.1	
Pirates					55	0.1	
ÖDP					39	0.1	
BüSo					27	0.1	
Informal votes		876			297		
Total valid votes		43,391			43,970		
Turnout		44,267	73.9	▲3.9			
CDU hold	Majority	1,633	3.8				

=== 2019 election ===
State election (2019): Chemnitz 3
Notes:	Blue background denotes the winner of the electorate vote. Pink background denotes a candidate elected from their party list. Yellow background denotes an electorate win by a list member, or other incumbent. A ✓ or ✗ denotes status of any incumbent, win or lose respectively.						
Party	Candidate	Votes	%	±%	Party votes	%	±%
CDU	✓ Ines Saborowski	13,395	31.8	▼4.2	14,276	33.8	▼2.6
AfD		11,185	26.5		11,317	26.8	▲17.4
Left		6,085	14.4	▼14.3	5,197	12.3	▼11.2
SPD		4,385	10.4	▼5.3	3,678	8.7	▼5.5
Greens		3,281	7.8	▲2.1	3,113	7.4	▲2.1
FW		1,613	3.8		868	2.1	▲1.5
FDP		1,395	3.3	▼1.4	1,557	3.7	▲0.4
Citizens' Movement Pro Chemnitz		812	1.9				
PARTEI					708	1.7	▲1.1
APT					599	1.4	▲0.4
Verjüngungsforschung					219	0.5	
NPD					146	0.3	▼3.7
The Blue Party					113	0.3	
ÖDP					113	0.3	
Pirates					111	0.3	▼0.9
Humanists					97	0.2	
Awakening of German Patriots - Central Germany					86	0.2	
DKP					41	0.1	
PDV					30	0.1	
BüSo					24	0.1	▼0.1
Informal votes		470			328		
Total valid votes		42,151			42,293		
Turnout		42,621	67.7	▲18.5			
CDU hold	Majority	2,210	5.3	▼2.0			

=== 2014 election ===
State election (2014): Chemnitz 3
Notes:	Blue background denotes the winner of the electorate vote. Pink background denotes a candidate elected from their party list. Yellow background denotes an electorate win by a list member, or other incumbent. A ✓ or ✗ denotes status of any incumbent, win or lose respectively.						
Party	Candidate	Votes	%	±%	Party votes	%	±%
CDU	Ines Saborowski	11,482	36.0		11,689	36.4	
Left		9,144	28.7		7,557	23.5	
SPD		5,010	15.7		4,565	14.2	
AfD					3,011	9.4	
Greens		1,832	5.7		1,689	5.3	
FDP		1,505	4.7		1,066	3.3	
NPD		1,827	5.7		1,286	4.0	
Pirates		722	2.3		385	1.2	
APT					324	1.0	
FW					206	0.6	
PARTEI					186	0.6	
Pro Germany Citizens' Movement					74	0.2	
BüSo		351	1.1		65	0.2	
DSU					31	0.1	
Informal votes		556			295		
Total valid votes		31,873			32,134		
Turnout		32,429	49.2	▼12.2			
CDU win new seat	Majority	2,338	7.3				

== See also ==
- Politics of Saxony
- Landtag of Saxony
