= Franz Wigard =

German physician and liberal politician

Franz Jacob Wigard
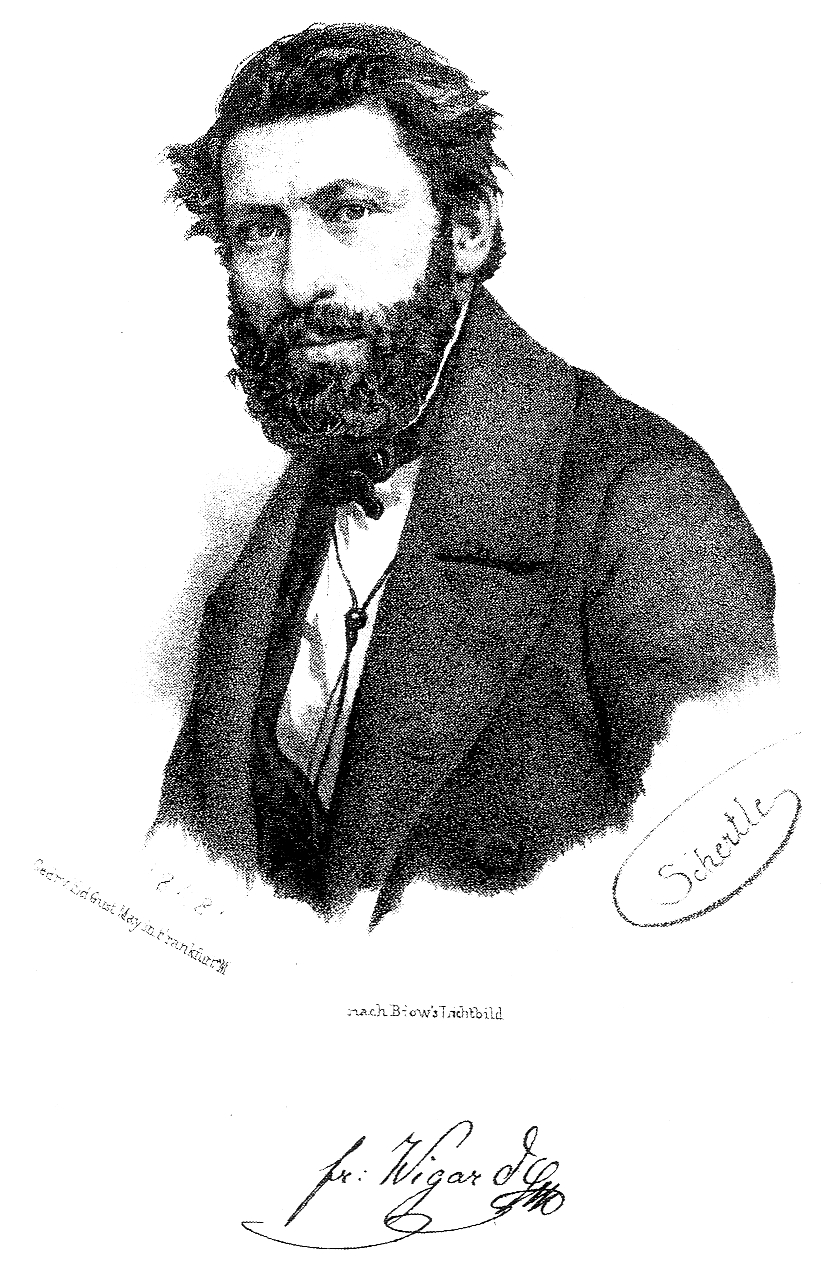
- Franz Jacob Wigard (ca 1848)
- Born: 31 May 1807; Mannheim, Baden
- Died: 25 September 1885 (aged 78); Dresden, Saxony, Germany
- Occupations: political activist stenographer physician
- Spouse: Maria Elisabeth Köhler (1814-1874)

Franz Jacob Wigard (31 May 1807 – 25 September 1885) was a German medical doctor who eventually built a career as a liberal politician in the Kingdom of Saxony.

He belonged to the "Freireligiösen" (religious humanist) movement and also championed the use of Shorthand. Before and after 1871 he sat as a member of the German Reichstag.

== Life ==
=== Early years ===
Wigard was born in Mannheim in the summer of 1807, during the Napoleonic War. His father's occupation is given as court librarian ("Sekretär hofbibliothek"). Between 1826 and 1832, he attended the Ludwig-Maximilians-Universität München where his studies covered Roman Catholic theology, philosophy, jurisprudence and cameralism (Administration sciences). In 1827, he joined the prestigious Corps Palatia Munich (student fraternity). He undertook a training in stenography (shorthand) with Franz Xaver Gabelsberger and entered government service. In 1831, he was recorded working as a stenographer in the Bavarian parliament (Landtag). By 1834, he had moved to Saxony and in 1834 was employed as a stenographer in the Saxon parliament in Dresden. In 1834, Franz Jacob Wigard founded the Saxony Stenography Institute at Dresden and in 1843 he was appointed to a professorship in the subject. From 1845, he was also a leading representative of the so-called "German Catholics" ("deutschkatholische Bewegung"), a movement of dissenting politically focused Roman Catholics.

=== Switch to medicine ===
His political-religious activities during the increasingly fevered period between 1845 and 1848 led to his being relieved of his job as a parliamentary stenographer. He continued to devote himself to political activism, and also returned during the 1850s to student studies, this time undertaking medical studies at the Academy for Medicine and Surgery at Dresden. From 1856 he was working as a physician in Dresden. In 1858 Franz Jacob Wigard obtained his full doctoral qualification at the University of Jena.

=== Politics ===
Wigard was prominent as a political activist during the revolutionary period of 1848/49. He was a member of the "pre-parliament" that met in the Pauluskirche in Frankfurt at the start of April 1848, of the Frankfurt Parliament that followed it and of the ensuing Rump Parliament until its existence was forcibly ended in June 1849. As a result of his participation in the Rump Parliament he was charged with high treason, but he was acquitted. Later, in 1850 and again in 1869/70, he sat as a member of the Saxony Parliament ("Sächsischer Landtag"). From 1867 until 1870 he sat as a member of the short-lived North German Reichstag. Following unification in 1871, this was replaced with a new national Reichstag: he sat as a member of this until 1874, representing the Dresden Old City Reichstag constituency. During his Reichstag years he sat as a member of the liberal-leaning Progressive Party.
