= Julius von Kirchmann =

German jurist and philosopher (1802–1884)

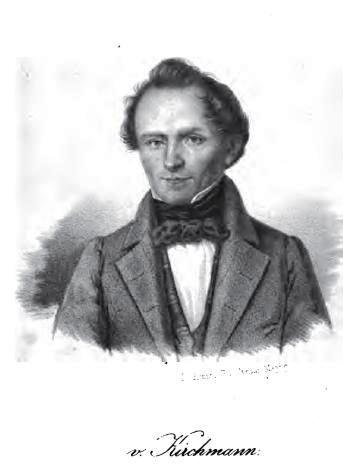
- Born: 5 November 1802; Schafstädt, Holy Roman Empire
- Died: 20 October 1884 (aged 81); Berlin, Germany

Julius Hermann von Kirchmann (5 November 1802 – 20 October 1884) was a German jurist and philosopher.

== Career ==
Born in Schafstädt near Merseburg, Kirchmann was educated at Leipzig and Halle universities. He was made state's attorney in the criminal court of Berlin in 1846, and two years afterwards was chosen to the Prussian National Assembly. From 1871 to 1876, he was a member of the Reichstag, the German Empire's parliament, for the German Progress Party. His philosophy was an attempt to mediate between realism and idealism. On the fugacity of law, he said "only three words of the legislature can destroy whole libraries".

== Writings ==
Kirchmann first attracted attention as a philosopher by his brochure Die Wertlosigkeit der Jurisprudenz als Wissenschaft (The Worthlessness of Jurisprudence as a Body of Knowledge; 1848). His other philosophical writings include: Ueber Unsterblichkeit (On Immortality; 1865), Aesthetik auf realistischer Grundlage (A Realistic Foundation for Aesthetics; 1868); translations of parts of Aristotle, Roger Bacon, Hugo Grotius, David Hume, Gottfried Wilhelm Leibniz, and Baruch Spinoza, and a remarkable edition of Immanuel Kant in the Philosophische Bibliothek, edited by him (1868 et seq.), and of Thomas Hobbes' De Cive (1873).

== Bibliography ==
- Gilman, D. C.; Peck, H. T.; Colby, F. M., eds. (1905). "Kirchmann, Julius von" . New International Encyclopedia (1st ed.). New York: Dodd, Mead. This work in turn cites:
  - Lasson and Meineke, Julius von Kirchmann als Philosoph (Halle, 1885)
