= List of presidents of the I Chamber of the Landtag of Saxony =

The President of the I Chamber of the Landtag of Saxony was the presiding officer of the upper chamber of that legislature.

Name	Period
Ernst Gustav von Gersdorf	1833–1843
Albert von Carlowitz	1845–1846
Friedrich von Friesen	1847
Friedrich Ernst von Schönfels	1848
Hermann Joseph	1849
Robert Georgi	1849–1850
Friedrich Ernst von Schönfels	1850–1862
Friedrich von Frisen	1863–1870
Ludwig Freiherr von Zehmen	1871–1890
Richard von Könneritz	1891–1906
Friedrich Vitzthum von Eckstädt	1907–1918
