= Christian Riedel =

German politician (1804–1882)

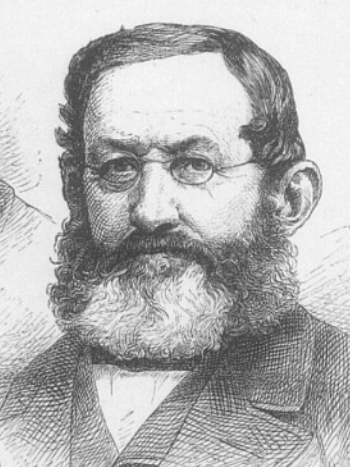
Christian Riedel, Die Gartenlaube, (1873) "Saxony's free-spirited representatives"

Christian Riedel (31 January 1804, Luptin – 30 September 1882, Zittau) was a German politician active in the Kingdom of Saxony where he led the left liberals of the German Progress Party in the 1867 Reichstag elections. He was known as "Old Riedel". He was elected for the Zittau Reichstag constituency in the February and August elections of 1867. In 1873 he was elected to the Landtag of the Kingdom of Saxony.

Riedel was a landowner and a farmer. He was self-taught and became politically active during the 1848 Revolution.
