= Wilhelm Schaffrath =

German jurist and politician (1814–1893)

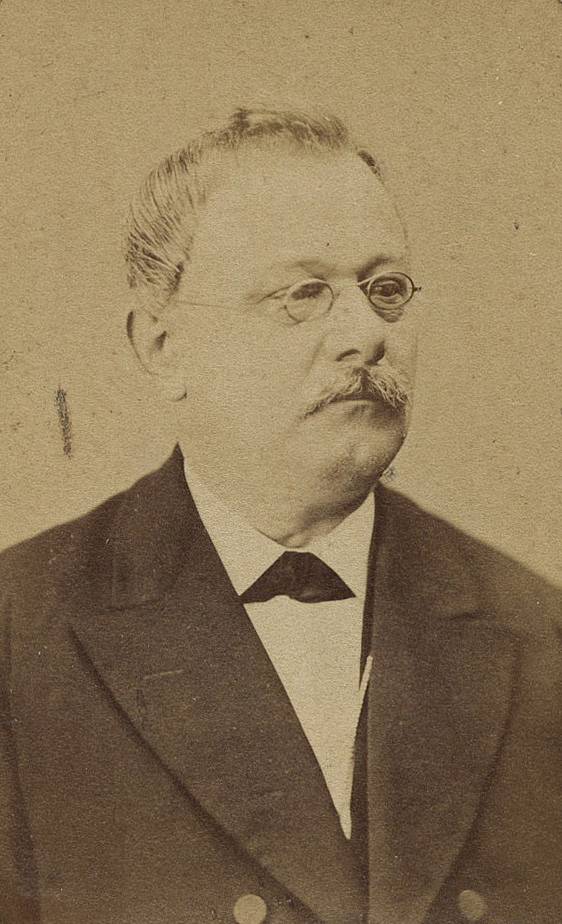
- Wilhelm Schaffrath (ca 1873)
- Born: Wilhelm Michael Schaffrath; 1 May 1814; Schöna, Saxony
- Died: 7 May 1893 (aged 79); Dresden, Kingdom of Saxony, Germany
- Occupations: Jurist/lawyer; Political activist Politician
- Spouse: Thekla Bauer
- Parent(s): Michael Gotthold Schaffrath; Christina Dorothea Hille/Schaffrath

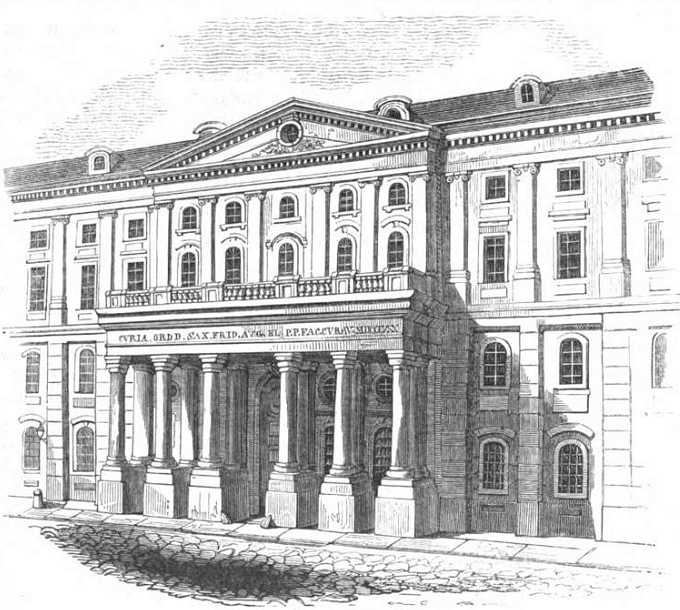
The "Landhaus" (parliament building) in Dresden (1843)

Wilhelm Schaffrath (1 May 1814 – 7 May 1893) was a German jurist and politician. He was a member of the Frankfurt Parliament in 1848, and after 1871 a member of the national Reichstag. He was also, at various stages, a member of the Landtag of Saxony.

== Life ==
=== Early years ===
Wilhelm Michael Schaffrath was born, one of his parents' ten children, in Schöna, a small town in southern Saxony, close to the frontier with Austria. Two years after his birth the family relocated in connection with his father's work the short distance to Lauterbach, a parish of Stolpen. His father, Michael Gotthold Schaffrath, worked at one stage as a master weaver, and later, in Lauterbach, as a village school teacher. Because the family was poor they were obliged to live in the school house, and from the age of eight Wilhelm was contributing to the family budget by working as a part-time shepherd boy.

Wilhelm was identified early on by the local priest as a talented scholar, and his ability was encouraged, notably by the Stolpen deacon who taught him Latin. The Stolpen municipality awarded him a free school place which enabled him to obtain a first-class education at the Saint Afra School for gifted students in the city of Meissen. Here he was talent-spotted by the crown prince Frederick (who later became King Frederick August II) who facilitated Schaffrath's entry to the Law faculty at Leipzig University in order to study Jurisprudence. He completed his first degree in only three years, and took his doctorate a year after that, receiving his teaching qualification.

At the age of 23 Wilhelm Schaffrath prepared to settle down to an academic career. Events intervened, however. During the time that he was working for his doctorate he undertook the legal defense of 19 Burschenschaft (student association) members who had faced charges of "participation in secret and revolutionary associations" ("wegen Teilnahme an geheimen und revolutionären Verbindungen"). The charges arose because membership of a student association was at the time considered sufficient to support them. The defendants were convicted and faced several years of detention. Schaffrath succeeded in obtaining their acquittal at an appeal hearing before the High Court (Königlich-Sächsische Oberappellationsgericht) at Dresden. He then took the matter a stage further by publishing a report of the case. As a result, he found himself denied a university teaching post, or indeed any job in public service. In 1840 he was elected a district judge in Sebnitz and in 1841 mayor in Mühltroff, but he was not able to take up either position because the central government refused to confirm the appointments.

=== A career in law and politics ===
In 1841 Schaffrath set himself up as a lawyer in Neustadt near Stolpen where in 1842 he was elected as a town councillor. In 1845/46 he was able to participate in the Saxony regional assembly (Landtag) as an "urban deputy" following an exhaustive investigation by the authorities which failed to find any reason to block the election result. He was described by the liberal radical contemporary Bernhard Hirschel as the "conscience" of the assembly ("Rechtsgewissen" der Zweiten Kammer) because of his "exceptional legal knowledge" (wegen seiner "außerordentlichen Gesetzkenntnis"). It was also during this time that he developed his friendship with the Leipzig based politician and democracy-activist, Robert Blum. Together they produced two politically radical newspapers entitled "Verfassungsfreund" ("The Constitution's Friend ") and the "Sächsische Vaterlandsblätter" ("The Saxony Fatherland's journal"). Schaffrach was present at meetings of the Hallgarten Circle, and was elected a member of the Frankfurt Parliament when it convened in May 1848.

Because of his participation in the Frankfurt Parliament in 1848/49 he was unable to return to the Saxony Landtag. Instead he remained in Frankfurt. He did not join in the popular uprising later in 1848, but was still a member of the Frankfurt parliament when it relocated to Stuttgart, and was still a member of what came to be known as the Stuttgarter Rumpfparlament when it was closed down at gunpoint in June 1849. After the year of revolutions he emigrated to Switzerland where he successfully claimed political asylum till 1852. He returned to Saxony and was able to negotiate a full judicial pardon, which opened the way for a return to his political career. He returned to Neustadt where in 1852 he became an authorized public notary. In 1856 he relocated to Dresden, where in 1872 he obtained permission to undertake public notary work. The move to Dresden was followed by an almost ten-year break in his political career.

Schaffrath was one of the founders, in 1863, of the Sächsischen Fortschrittsverein (Saxony Progressive Association), the Saxony component of what was becoming the pan-German left-wing liberal Progressive Party. Between 1865 and 1872 he sat as a member of the Dresden City Council, remaining active in city politics till the mid 1870s.

In February 1867 he was elected as a Progress Party member to the Reichstag of the newly created North German Confederation. Both the confederation and its Reichstag proved short-lived. Following unification, however, in 1871 they were replaced by a new German state and a new national Parliament (Reichstag). Wilhelm Schaffrath was a member between March 1871 and 1874, and again between 1878 and 1879.

At the same time, in October 1871 he was also elected a member of the Landtag of Saxony, where he would sit as a member till 1879. Despite the unceremonious nature of his exclusion from the chamber in 1849, following his high-profile participation in the political aspects of the events of 1848, in 1871 he was promptly elected president of the Saxony Second Chamber, and the king confirmed the appointment. However, he lost the presidency of the chamber in 1875 following fresh regional elections in 1874 which had given the conservative parties a majority in the chamber, and the presidency passed to Ludwig Haberkorn.

During the ten years from 1883 till his death he served as an elected judge in the Saxony district court. He also undertook other senior functions of a political and administrative nature, both locally and on a national level.
