= Ludwig Joseph Gerstner =

Joseph Gerstner (10 October 1830 - 20 March 1883) was an economics professor and a scholar of constitutional law who became a politician (DFP).

== Life ==
Ludwig Joseph Gerstner was born into a Catholic family in Burg Abenberg, a small town in the hilly countryside south of Nuremberg. Sources are silent on his father's profession. His family appears to have relocated to the other side of Nuremberg, since he attended the secondary school ("Gymnasium") at Bamberg till 1849. Between 1849 and 1853 he studied at Erlangen after which for several years he ran his own legal practice. He received a doctorate from Tübingen in May 1856 for a dissertation on the importance of teaching basic economics at elementary and middle schools. A year later he received his habilitation (higher degree) back at Erlangen.

In 1862, Gerstner was appointed a Professor of National Economics ("Staatswirtschaft") at the University of Würzburg. In his "Basic primer on National Administration" ("Grundlehren der Staatsverwaltung"), a work triggered by the reconfiguration of the Bavarian civil service, he set out to propound a general "organic Christian" theory. He defined the state as a "unity and totality", and as an "organic entity willed by God, which is designed to see to it that in a given territory a majority of the people will be steered towards physical-material and intellectual-spiritual perfection, guided by the highest magisterial will according to fixed norms and methods and according to the laws of nature".

Despite the similarity of such aspirations to the natural law doctrines popular during the eighteenth century, they found real resonance in Gerstner's own time, when predicated on the separation between society and the state propounded by Robert von Mohl, and based on a constructive interaction between constitution and administration. Gerstner's attempt to develop a curriculum covering public administration embracing "Doctrine of Administration in all material aspects" in turn drew influence from Lorenz von Stein's book, "Administration Primer" ("Verwaltungslehre").

Following the upheavals that opened the way for unification, Bavaria found itself merged. The new German state incorporated Bavaria (but expressly excluded Austria): it was dominated by Prussia. The first general election for the national parliament ("Reichstag") was held at the beginning of March 1871. Professor Joseph Gerstner was elected to it, representing the Unterfranken (Lower Franconia) electoral district, which covered Aschaffenburg and Würzburg. He is listed as one of the 44 representatives of the Progressive Party ("Deutsche Fortschrittspartei" / DFP). The new country's second general election took place in January 1874, but after serving out his first term Gerstner did not stand for election for a second term.

Joseph Gerstner was able to combine his membership of the German national assembly (Reichstag) with membership of the Bavarian Landtag, the lower house of Bavaria's ("regional") parliament. He is listed as a member of the Bavarian Landtag between 1869 and 1875. In the Bavarian legislature (where, naturally, he is also listed as a member of the DFP) he was a member of no fewer than six apparently important parliamentary committees, suggesting that in reality he probably devoted more time to his parliamentary responsibilities in the Munich assembly than those in the national parliament in Berlin.
