= Bundespräsidium =

Title under the German Confederation

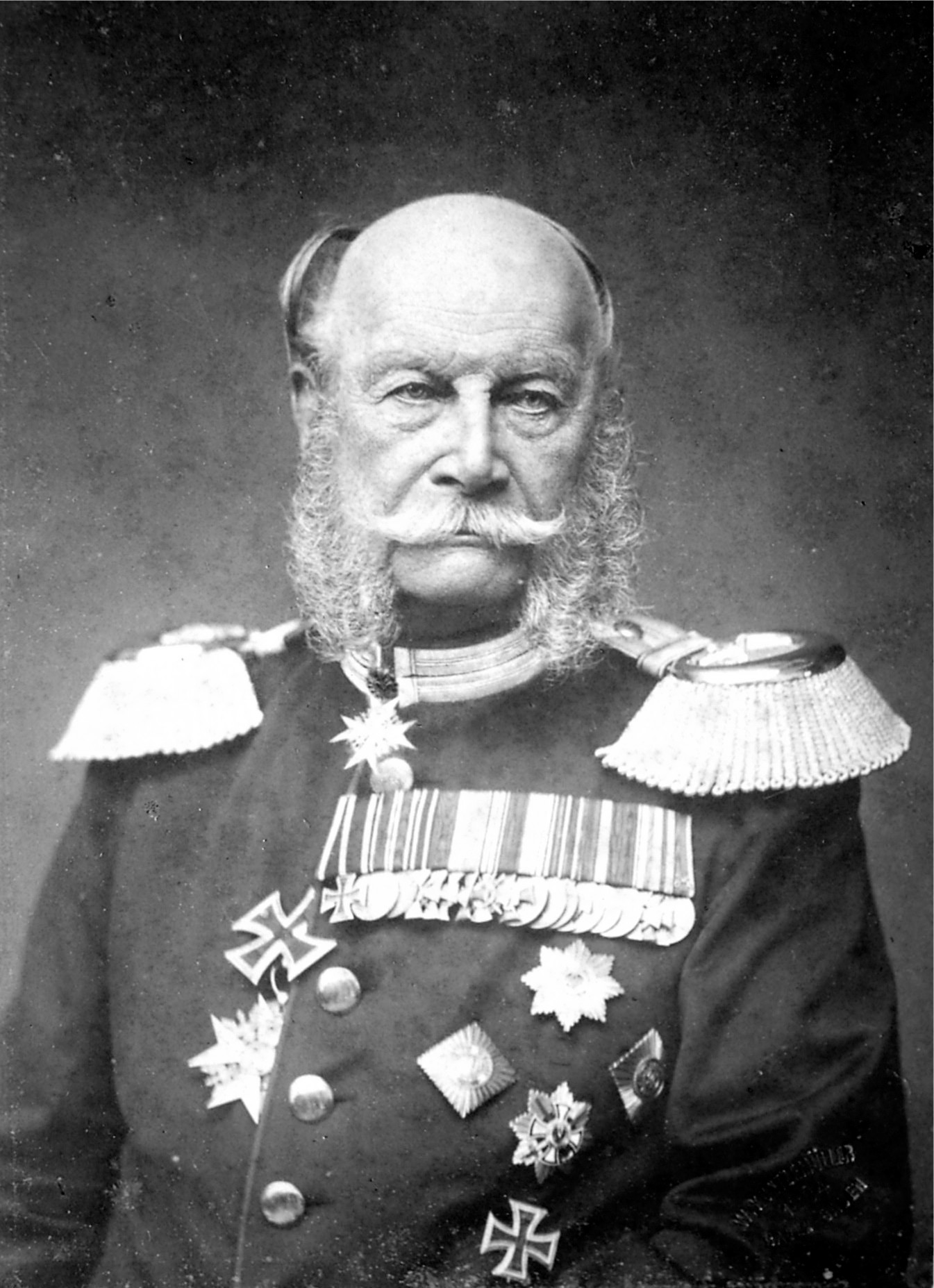
Wilhelm I, since 1861 King of Prussia, was the only holder of the Präsidium des Bundes during the North German Confederation.

Chart illustrating the political system of the North German Confederation

Präsidium des Bundes or Bundespräsidium (German: [ˈbʊndəs.pʁɛˌziːdi̯ʊm], roughly chairmanship of the federation) was a title under the German Confederation (1815–1848, 1851–1866) whereby the Austrian delegate held the chair of the Federal Assembly. Austria was thus called the presiding power (German: Präsidialmacht). This did not give Austria extra competencies: its delegate simply led the proceedings of the Federal Assembly.

Later, during the North German Confederation (1867–1871), the same title was used for an office functioning as head of state. According to the constitution, the holder of this office was always the king of Prussia. The king was also Bundesfeldherr, federal commander-in-chief. The constitutional changes of 1870–1871 renamed the North German Confederation to the German Empire; the title and function of Bundespräsidium remained, but was combined with the additional title Deutscher Kaiser (German Emperor).
