= Wilhelm Bracke =

German politician and publisher

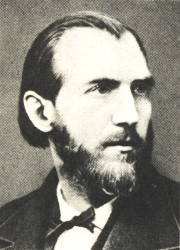
Wilhelm Bracke

Hermann August Franz Wilhelm Gotthard Bracke (29 May 1842 – 27 April 1880) was a German socialist publisher and publicist who was a founding member of the Social Democratic Workers' Party of Germany, the forerunner to the Social Democratic Party.

== Biography ==
Wilhelm Bracke was born into the family of a miller and grain merchant from Braunschweig. He attended a secondary school after attending the Martino-Katharineum, contrary to his father's wish that he complete a commercial apprenticeship so that he could later take over his father's trading business. He himself wanted to study physics or chemistry later. While studying at the Collegium Carolinum, he became a member of the General German Workers' Association (ADAV), which was founded by Ferdinand Lassalle, and co-founded the Brunswick fraternity Germania in the autumn of 1861.

Over time, he became increasingly active on a political level. On September 6, 1865, he founded a section of the General German Workers' Association in Braunschweig where he organized meetings and became a member of the board of the ADAV.

In 1869 he met Karl Marx in Hanover at Louis Kugelmann's house, with whom he remained in contact throughout his life. Within the ADAV he represented oppositional views, which he shared with August Bebel and Wilhelm Liebknecht. This tendency led to a group of members splitting off and the founding of the Social Democratic Workers' Party of Germany (SDAP) at the founding party conference from 7 to 9 August 1869 in Eisenach. After the party was founded, Bracke became its spokesman; Braunschweig was chosen as the first seat. In 1870 he was arrested for calling for peace and sentenced to three months in prison. After his release from prison he founded his own publishing house and the newspaper Braunschweiger Volksfreund where he published, among other things, the first biography of Karl Marx.

In 1872 he was the first Social Democrat to be elected to the council of the city of Braunschweig. In 1877 he became a member of the Reichstag. In the Reichstag session on 11 October 1878, Bracke uttered the words that reflected the attitude of all Social Democrats during the Anti-Socialist Law: "Gentlemen, I want to tell you: we don't care about the law." For health reasons he had to give up his mandate in 1879.

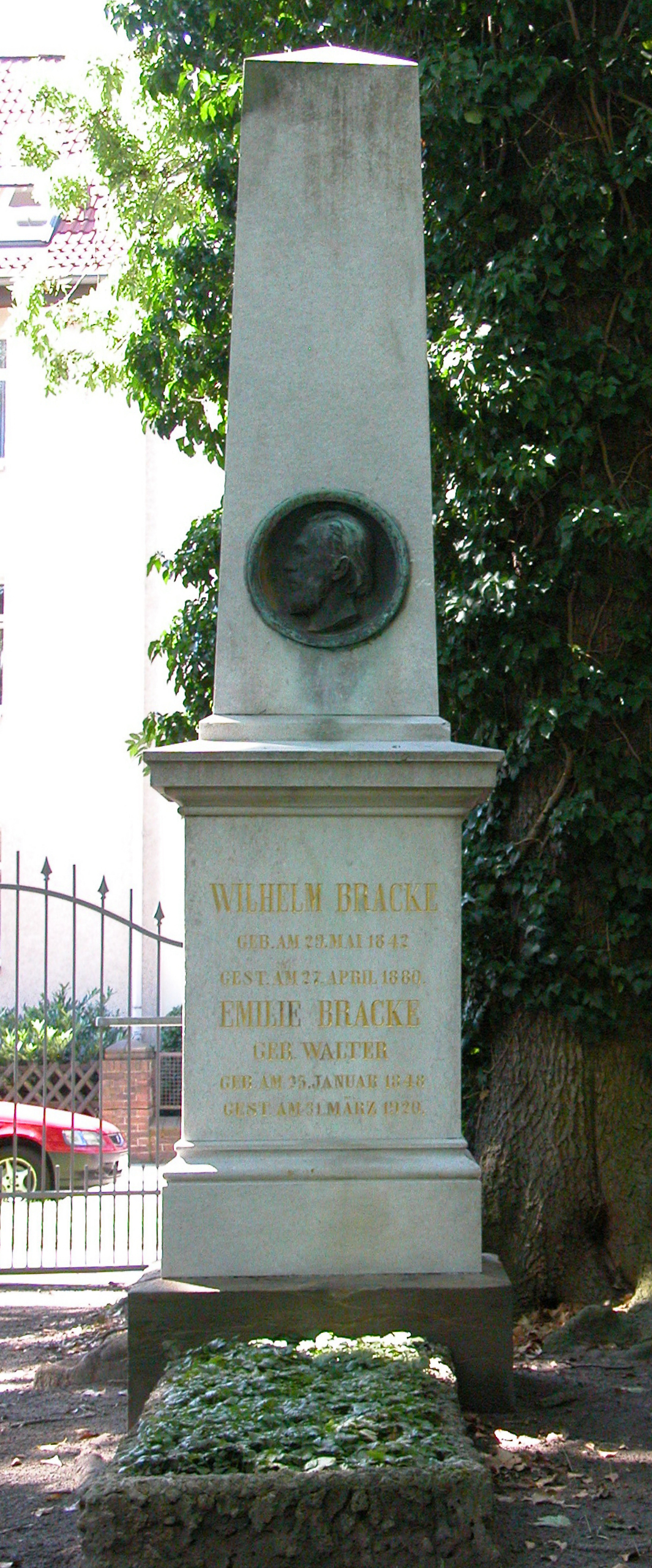
Grave of Wilhelm Bracke and his wife Emilie, née Walter, in Petrifriedhof

On April 27, 1880, Wilhelm Bracke died at the age of 37. More than 30,000 people attended his funeral on May 2, 1880. His grave is in the Petrifriedhof cemetery in Braunschweig.

On the occasion of his 125th birthday, the Wilhelm Bracke Medal was awarded by the German Booksellers’ Association in Leipzig in East Germany from 1968 to 1989 to publishers.

== Publications ==
- Zur Arbeiterfrage. In: Der Social-Demokrat. Berlin vom 3. und 8. November und 22. Dezember 1867.
- Die Frauenarbeit. In: Der Social-Demokrat. Berlin vom 6. und 8. Dezember 1867.
- Eine Position nach der anderen! In: Braunschweiger Volksfreund vom 18. Februar 1873.
- Der Braunschweiger Ausschuß der social-demokratischen Arbeiter-Partei in Lötzen und vor dem Gericht. Braunschweig 1872. Digitalisat
- Der Lassalle'sche Vorschlag. Ein Wort an den 4. Congreß der social-demokratischen Arbeiterpartei. Braunschweig 1873. MDZ Digitalisat
- Das Spectrum. In: Volks-Kalender 1876. Braunschweig 1875.
- „Nieder mit den Sozialdemokraten!“ Braunschweig 1876 (Digitalisat, Berlin 1896).
- Die Verzweiflung im liberalen Lager. Antwort auf die sieben Artikel der Magdeburgischen Zeitung und die Schmähschrift des Herrn Unruh. Braunschweig 1876. MDZ Digitalisat
- Gotthold Ephraim Lessing. In: Volks-Kalender 1878. Braunschweig 1877.
- Hütet Euch vor den 300 Millionen neuen Steuern! Nebst einem Anhange: Die Reden Brackes im deutschen Reichstage 1877 und 1878. Braunschweig 1878. MDZ Digitalisat
- Der Himmel. Eine naturwissenschaftliche Skizze. In: Der arme Conrad. Leipzig 1878.
