= Ludwig Haberkorn =

German politician

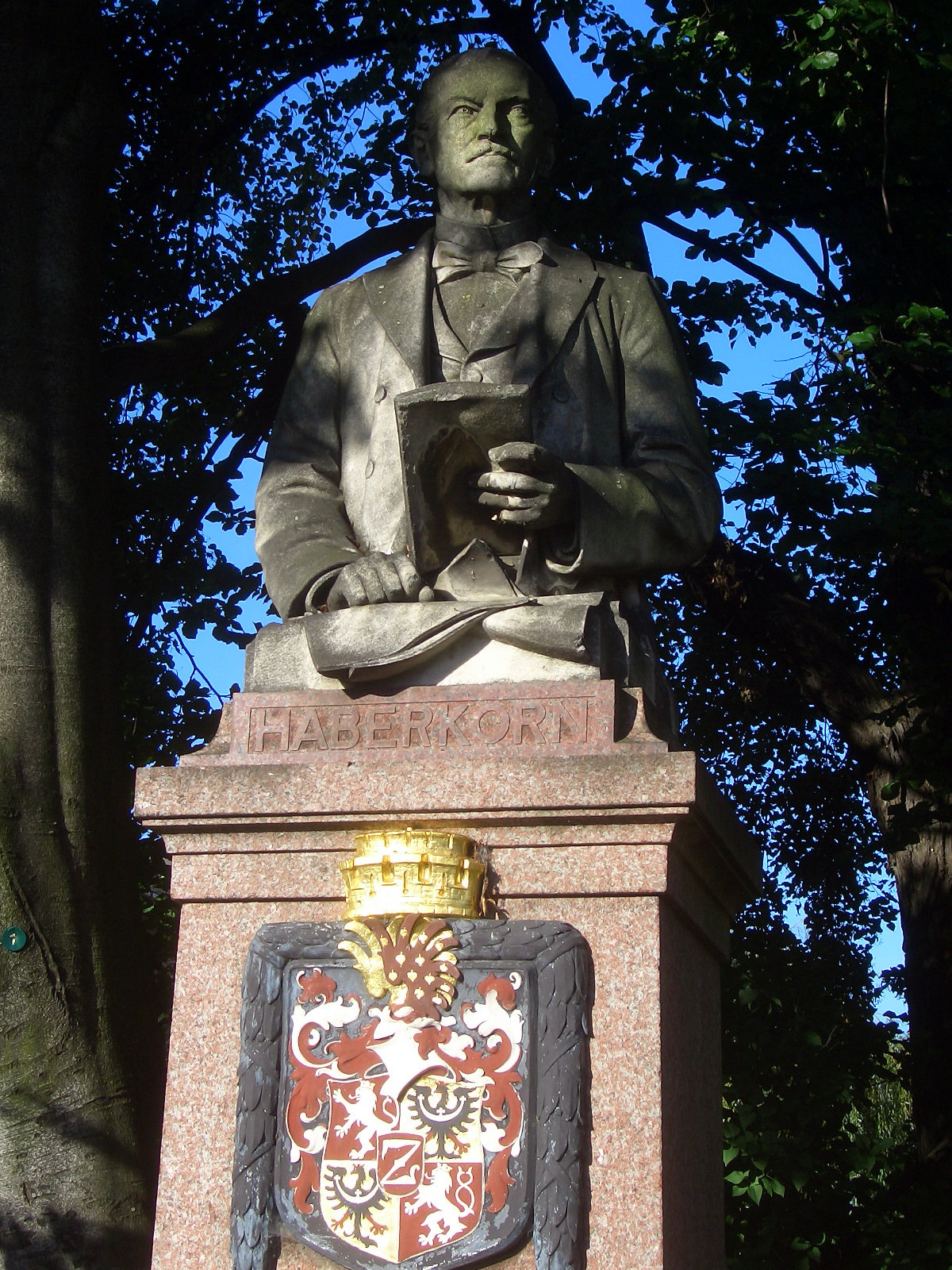
Ludwig Haberkorn Monument Zittau 2009.jpeg

Daniel Ferdinand Ludwig Haberkorn (born 2 September 1811 in Kamenz - 6 April 1901 in Zittau) was a German conservative politician. He was a member of the Saxon State Parliament and long-time President of the II. Chamber.
