= North German Confederation Treaty =

1866 treaty forming the North German Confederation

The North German Confederation Treaty (German: Augustverträge, "August Treaties", or Augustbündnis, "August Alliance "; also called the North German Federation Treaty and the Treaty of 18 August 1866) was the treaty between the Kingdom of Prussia and other northern and central German states that initially created the North German Confederation, which was the forerunner to the German Empire. This treaty, and others that followed in September and October, are often described as the August treaties, although not all of them were concluded in August 1866.

The treaties followed the Austro-Prussian War of Summer 1866, after which the German Confederation of 1815 was dissolved. The treaties established:

- a military alliance, and
- an agreement to transform the alliance into a nation state, based on the Prussian reform plan for the German Confederation

The German states involved arranged the election of a North German parliament in February 1867. The parliament on the one hand, and the governments on the other, agreed on a constitution for the North German Confederation on 1 July 1867. This Confederation, a federal state, was expanded in 1870–71 with the south German states and became the German Empire. The August treaty of 1866, therefore, can be seen as the first legal document that established the modern German nation state.

== Signing and contents ==
The treaty was signed at Berlin on 18 August 1866, between the preliminary and the final peace treaty between Austria and Prussia, which formally ended the Austro-Prussian War. Initially, the treaty bound the parties into a military alliance and an agreement to negotiate the creation of a formal federation. The treaty specified that if no agreement on confederation had been reached by August 1867, the duty to negotiate would expire after one year.

The full name of the treaty, translated to English, is Treaty of Alliance between Anhalt, Bremen, Brunswick, Hamburg, Lippe, Lübeck, Oldenburg, Prussia, Reuss-Schleitz, Saxe-Altenburg, Saxe-Coburg-Gotha, the Grand Duchy of Saxony, Schaumburg-Lippe, Schwarzburg-Rudolstadt, Schwarzburg-Sondershausen, and Waldeck and Pyrmont, signed at Berlin on 18 August 1866.

The leading Prussian politician was Otto von Bismarck, who had been chancellor since 1862. While the national liberals of Prussia urged him to force a national constitution on the smaller states of Northern and Central Germany, Bismarck had the intention to spare their feelings and to create the new state based on formal agreements. It was also a signal to the South German states, which Bismarck wanted to incorporate later. Bismarck drafted the constitution, which was changed by the allied governments and by the Reichstag, the North German parliament.

== Parties ==
The Kingdom of Prussia was the dominant party to the treaty. The other parties to the treaty pledged their military forces under the command of the King of Prussia.

The following states signed the treaty on 18 August and submitted ratifications on 8 September 1866:

- Duchy of Anhalt
- Bremen
- Duchy of Brunswick
- Hamburg
- Principality of Lippe
- Free City of Lübeck
- Grand Duchy of Oldenburg
- Kingdom of Prussia
- Principality of Reuss-Gera
- Duchy of Saxe-Altenburg
- Saxe-Coburg and Gotha
- Saxe-Weimar-Eisenach
- Principality of Schaumburg-Lippe
- Schwarzburg-Rudolstadt
- Schwarzburg-Sondershausen
- Principality of Waldeck

The following states submitted ratifications or accessions to the agreement at dates later in 1866:

- Grand Duchy of Mecklenburg-Schwerin
- Grand Duchy of Mecklenburg-Strelitz
- Grand Duchy of Hesse (northern parts only)
- Principality of Reuss-Greiz
- Duchy of Saxe-Meiningen
- Kingdom of Saxony

The Duchy of Lauenburg was not formally a member of the treaty, but it was implicated in the agreement because its duke was, from 1865, the Prussian king.

At the same time, the original East Prussian cradle of the Prussian statehood as well as the Prussian-held Polish- or Kashubian-speaking territories of Province of Posen, West Prussia, the Lauenburg and Bütow Land and Draheim were formally annexed into Germany.
