= Reichstag (North German Confederation) =

Parliament of the North German Confederation

North German Reichstag Norddeutscher Reichstag
- Legislative body of Germany

History
- Established: 18 August 1866
- Disbanded: 18 January 1871
- Preceded by: Federal Convention
- Succeeded by: Imperial Reichstag
- Seats: 382 (at dissolution)

Elections
- Voting system: Two-round system
- First election: February 1867
- Last election: 31 August 1867

Meeting place
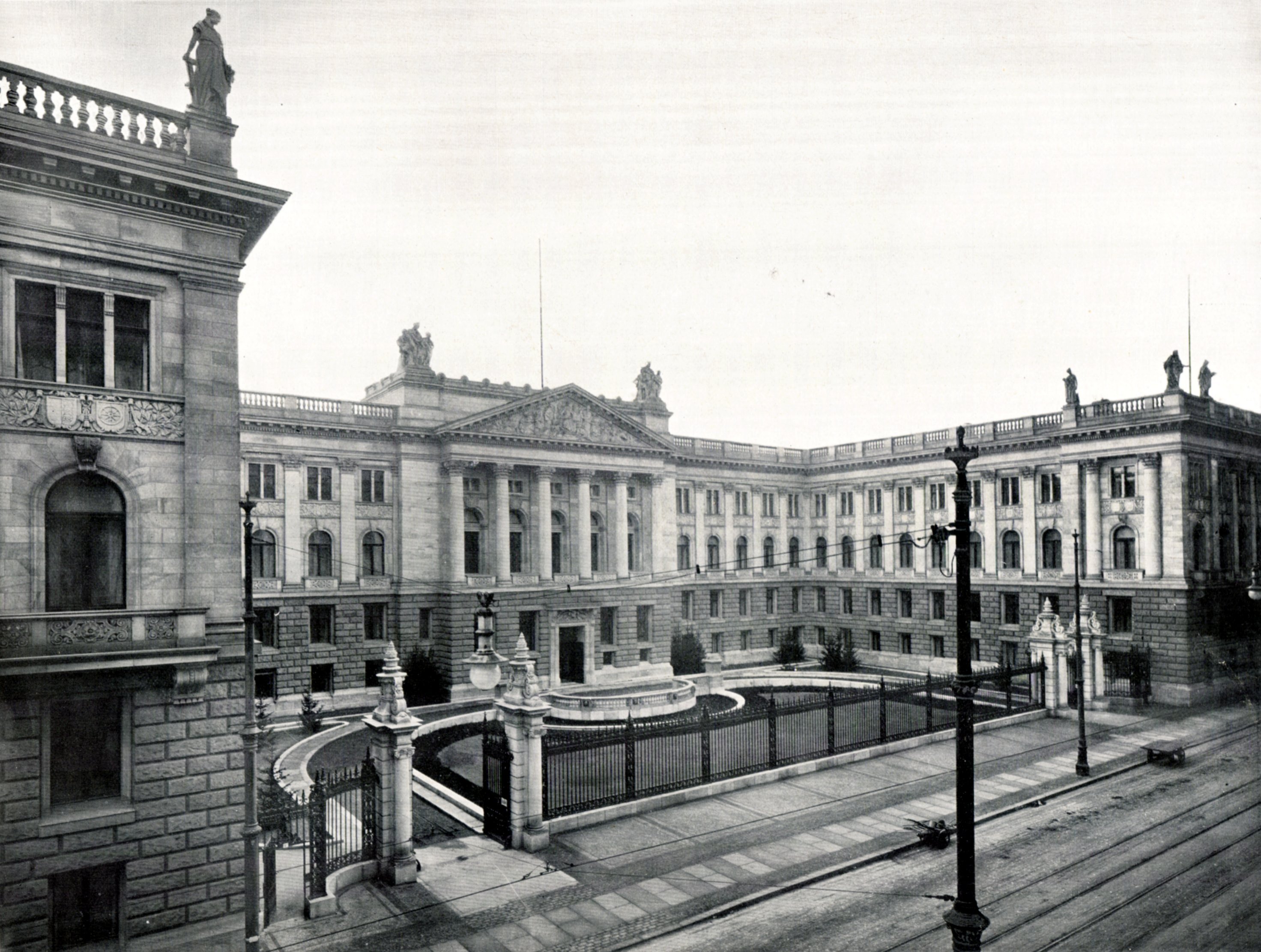
- Prussian House of Lords, Berlin

Constitution
- North German Constitution

The Reichstag (German: [ˈʁaɪçstaːk]) of the North German Confederation was the federal state's parliament. The popularly elected Reichstag was responsible for federal legislation together with the Bundesrat, whose members were appointed by the governments of the individual states to represent their interests. Executive power lay with the Bundesrat and the king of Prussia acting as Bundespräsidium, or head of state. The Reichstag debated and approved or rejected taxes and expenditures and could propose laws in its own right. To become effective, all laws required the approval of both the Bundesrat and the Reichstag. Voting rights in Reichstag elections were advanced for the time, granting universal, equal, and secret suffrage to men above the age of 25.

When the German Empire was established in 1871, the North German Reichstag formed the basis of the new Reichstag of the German Empire.

== Background ==
=== The draft constitution ===
Following Prussia's victory in the 1866 Austro-Prussian War, Otto von Bismarck, who was then minister president of Prussia, prepared a draft constitution for the North German Confederation in which the Reichstag was to form the representative body of the people. It was to take its place alongside the monarchical-federal executive power of the Bundesrat and the Bundespräsidium – the head of state in the person of the king of Prussia, William I. The Reichstag was to be given the powers of a popular legislative body customary for the era and was meant to counterbalance both monarchical influences and the particularism of the 22 states that made up the Confederation. Equally important for Bismarck was integrating the liberal-national movement into the Reichstag. Unlike the parliaments of the individual German states, it was to be elected by universal, equal, and secret manhood suffrage rather than by class or census suffrage, under which votes were weighted differently based on income, rank in society, and other qualifications. The voting age was twenty-six. Although the Reichstag was weaker than the other federal bodies, it was not marginalized in the drafting of the constitution.

Bismarck's stipulation that there be no pay for deputies was directed primarily against the election of workers' representatives, who would find it financially difficult to run for office. It was also intended to separate Reichstag membership from public employment, which meant that the many civil servants in state parliaments and the other public servants who formed a core part of Germany's liberal movement would be excluded.

=== Election of the constituent Reichstag ===
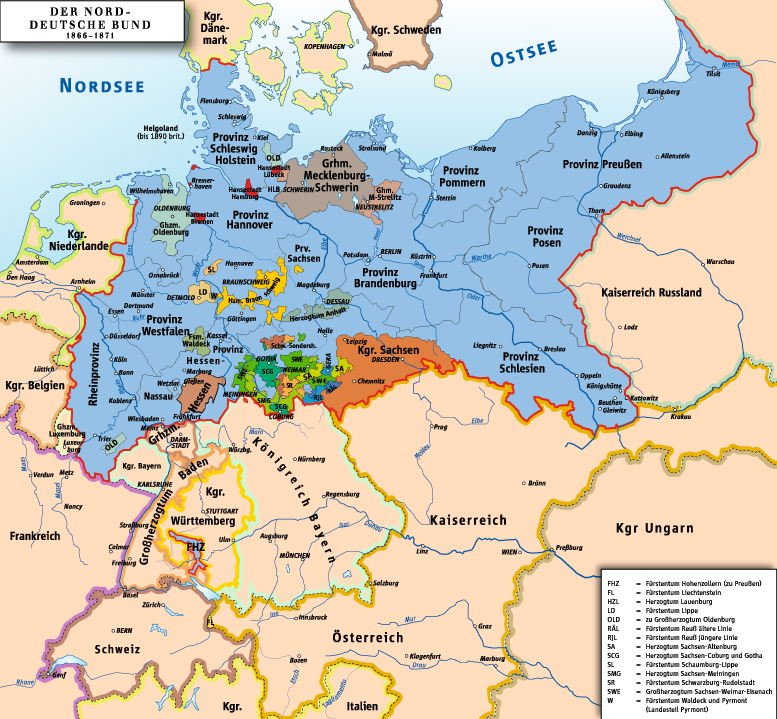
Map of North German Confederation 1866–1871. Prussia is in blue.

On 12 February 1867 a constituent Reichstag was elected on the basis of universal manhood suffrage to deliberate on the proposed constitution. The territory of the North German Confederation was divided into 297 electoral districts, in each of which one deputy was directly elected by majority vote. If no candidate achieved an absolute majority in the first round of voting, a runoff election was held between the top two candidates. In spite of considerable criticism of the North German Confederation, especially in the territories annexed by Prussia at the end of the Austro-Prussian War, there was no boycott of the elections. The overall voter turnout of almost 65% was significantly higher than in the elections to the Prussian state parliaments. Although the government tried to influence the elections, the results largely reflected the political sentiments of the population and differed little from those of the state parliaments. The majority in the constituent Reichstag was made up of the National Liberal Party (which had just split from the German Progress Party), the moderate-conservative Free Conservative Party and a few other liberal-minded deputies who joined with them. Together they accounted for 180 of the 297 seats and were those deputies who would potentially support Bismarck's policies. Opposite them stood 63 deputies from the Conservative Party, 13 who were Polish-speaking, 18 German-Hanoverians and other particularists, and 19 deputies from the German Progress Party. The anti-Prussian Saxon People's Party was represented by the two later Social Democratic parliamentarians August Bebel and Reinhold Schraps.

=== Composition of the constituent Reichstag ===
The president of the Reichstag was Eduard von Simson, who had held the position in the Frankfurt National Assembly in 1848–1849 and would hold it again in the Reichstag of the German Empire from 1871 to 1874. August Bebel later wrote in his memoirs that "the elite of North German politicians and parliamentary luminaries" had been assembled in the parliament. "The time of ideals is over," he concluded. "German unity has descended from a dream world into the prosaic world of reality. Politicians today have less than ever to ask what is desirable than what is achievable."

=== Debate on the constitution ===
Chart Constitution of the North German Confederation, showing the position of the Reichstag.

The constitutional deliberations took place largely within the parliament itself. In contrast to the Frankfurt National Assembly, there were few petitions or attempts to exert influence from the outside. Bismarck had reserved the right to impose a constitution in the event that too many changes were made to his draft. With that threat in the background, he was usually able to prevail in cases of conflict. The constitution included no catalog of fundamental rights, due in part to different formulations by the individual states. Bismarck also wanted to avoid ideological conflicts of principle, such as over the position in the state of the church or family. He nevertheless had to accept some compromises. He did not, for example, succeed in making the Reichstag president a "federal monarch".

The liberals failed in their demand that the heads of the federal ministries be responsible to parliament for their governmental acts. Rudolf von Bennigsen, leader of the National Liberal parliamentary group, then introduced language that came to be known as the "Lex Bennigsen". It made the chancellor responsible for the acts of the Bundespräsidium and took its place as part of Article 17 of the constitution:

"The Bundespräsidium shall be responsible for the promulgation and enactment of federal laws and for supervising their execution. The orders and decrees of the Bundespräsidium shall be issued in the name of the Federation and to be valid shall require the countersignature of the Federal Chancellor, who shall thereby assume responsibility."

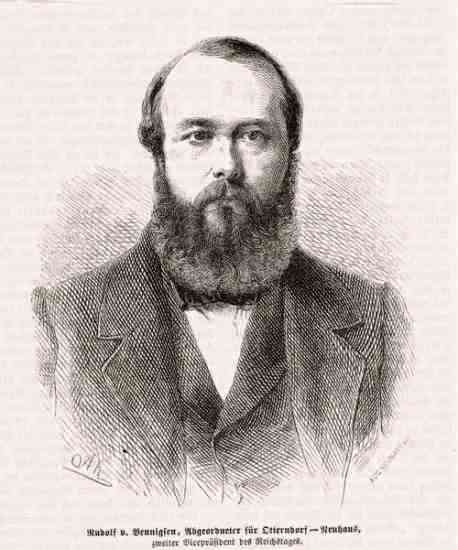
Rudolf von Bennigsen, c. 1871.

It was a fundamental change from the original draft constitution and meant that the chancellor would need to defend and represent his policies to parliament and the public. Although the chancellor continued to be appointed by the Bundespräsidium, he also became dependent to a certain extent on the majorities in the Reichstag. True parliamentary accountability, however, did not come about until the end of the German Empire.

Initially, the chancellor had been thought of as a manager of the Bundesrat, but with the Lex Bennigsen the position became as if it were another federal body. The change strengthened the central government against the federal element and increased the chancellor's political maneuverability. His responsibility to the Bundesrat was a partial success for the liberals because it strengthened the constitution.

Parliament agreed to the ban on deputy pay (Article 32), but because the Reichstag consisted largely of civil servants, it was able to prevent their planned exclusion from the body. The majority also succeeded in significantly expanding the Reichstag's ability to influence judicial and financial policy. Although there were certain reservations among National Liberals about universal manhood suffrage, they ultimately accepted it. The parliamentary majority also pushed through the secret ballot, preventing the authorities from supervising electoral behavior, which until then had been customary. The federal election law continued to be enforced until the end of the Empire in 1918.

The Reichstag had the right to propose laws and refer petitions to the Bundesrat or the chancellor (Article 5). Federal laws required majority votes by both the Bundesrat and the Reichstag to be enacted (Article 23). Parliament above all had the right to approve or reject budgets and tax revenues, which gave it a limited means of control over expenses. Instead of the three-year appropriation that Bismarck wanted, parliament pushed through a budget period of one year, although it did not apply to military spending, the largest item of expenditure. Bismarck originally wanted a permanent military budget and the liberals an annual term; they were able to reach compromise on a four-year budget. In the military sphere, the rights of parliament remained narrowly limited.

The legislative period of the Reichstag was three years. Dissolution during the period required a resolution of the Bundesrat with the consent of the Bundespräsidium (Article 24).

The constituent Reichstag adopted the constitution by 230 votes to 53 on 17 April 1867, with both liberals and conservatives voting in favor.

== Election to the first regular Reichstag ==
The first elections to a regular Reichstag as a constitutional body were held on 31 August 1867. At 40.5%, the turnout was significantly lower than in the previous ballot. In comparison to the constituent Reichstag, nothing significant changed in the majority. It was made up of National Liberals and Free Conservatives, although the split in the liberal movement became more visible. In the original Prussian provinces, the German Progress Party held its own against the National Liberals (14.2% to 13.8%). The National Liberals had their real strength in the new provinces (almost 40% vs. 6.3% for the Progress Party) and in the smaller federal states. Representatives of the labor movement were more strongly represented than in the first election. The Saxon People's Party, from which the Social Democratic Workers' Party (SDAP) emerged in 1869, won three seats, the General German Workers' Association (ADAV) two seats, and the Lassallean General German Workers' Association (LADAV), which had split from the ADAV, one seat. In by-elections in 1869, the ADAV and the LADAV each won one additional seat.

== Customs parliament ==
From 1868 to 1870 the members of the North German Reichstag were also members of the new German Customs Parliament (Zollparlament), representing the German Customs Union (Zollverein). The Customs Parliament also included 85 deputies from south Germany who were chosen in elections in February and March 1868 in Bavaria, Württemberg, Baden, and Hesse under the same electoral law used in the North German Confederation.

== Transition to the German Empire ==
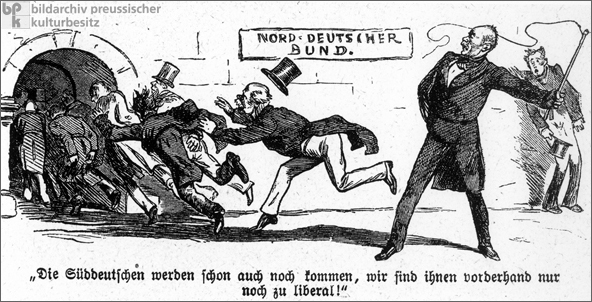
1868 cartoon showing Chancellor Bismarck whipping the South Germans into the Confederation, with the caption, “In the end, the South Germans, too, will join. We are obviously still too liberal for them!” Three years later, they voluntarily became part of the new German Empire.

After German victories in the Franco-Prussian War and negotiations on German unification between Bismarck and the states of Baden, Hesse, Bavaria and Württemberg, the North German Confederation on 9 December 1870 became the German Empire at the request of the Bundesrat and with the approval of the Reichstag. The new state became official on 1 January 1871 with the implementation of the Constitution of the German Confederation. The new Reichstag of the Empire was elected on 3 March 1871. In April it adopted a revised form of the Confederation's constitution, which was later called "Bismarck's Reich Constitution".

== Notable members ==
- Hermann Heinrich Becker
- Rudolf von Bennigsen
- Karl Braun
- Eduard Vogel von Falckenstein
- Max von Forckenbeck
- Gustav Freytag
- Rudolf von Gneist
- Eduard Lasker
- Hermann von Mallinckrodt
- Johannes von Miquel
- Eugen Richter
- Mayer Carl von Rothschild
- Franz Hermann Schulze-Delitzsch
- Eduard von Simson
- Karl Friedrich von Steinmetz
- Karl Twesten
- Hans Victor von Unruh
- Georg von Vincke
- Hermann Wagener
- Benedikt Waldeck
- Moritz Wiggers
- Ludwig Windthorst

== Literature ==
- Klaus Erich Pollmann: Parlamentarismus im Norddeutschen Bund 1867–1870 [Parliamentarianism in the North German Confederation 1867–1870.] (Düsseldorf: Droste Verlag, 1985) ISBN 3-7700-5130-0
- Wolfram Siemann: Gesellschaft im Aufbruch. Deutschland 1848–1871 [An Emerging Society. Germany 1848–1871]. (Frankfurt am Main: Suhrkamp, 1990) ISBN 3-518-11537-5, pp. 287 f. (Edition Suhrkamp 1537 = NF 537 – Neue historische Bibliothek).
- Hans Fenske: Deutsche Verfassungsgeschichte. Vom Norddeutschen Bund bis heute [German Constitutional History. From the North German Confederation to the Present]. (Berlin: Edition Colloquium, 1993) ISBN 3-89166-164-9, pp. 13–16
- Hans-Ulrich Wehler: "Deutsche Gesellschaftsgeschichte, Vol. 3", In: Von der "Deutschen Doppelrevolution" bis zum Beginn des Ersten Weltkrieges 1849–1914 ["German Social History, Vol. 3", In: From the "German Double Revolution" to the Beginning of the First World War 1849–1914]. (Munich: Beck, 1944) ISBN 3-406-32263-8, p. 303
- Egbert Weiß: "Corpsstudenten im Reichstag des Norddeutschen Bundes. Ein Beitrag zum 130-jährigen Jubiläum" in: Einst und Jetzt. Volume 42 ["Corps students in the Reichstag of the North German Confederation. A contribution to the 130th Anniversary" in: Once and Now. Volume 42] (1997) ISSN 0420-8870, pp. 9–40.
- Thomas Nipperdey: Deutsche Geschichte 1866–1918. Volume 2: Machtstaat vor der Demokratie [German History 1866–1918. Volume 2: Power State before Democracy]. (Munich: Beck, 1998) ISBN 3-406-44038-X pp. 41–48.
