= Reinhold Schraps =

German politician and lawyer

Member of the Reichstag of the North German Confederation for Zwickau (Saxony 18)
- In office 12 February 1867 – 3 March 1871

Member of the Reichstag of the German Empire for Zwickau (Saxony 18)
- In office 3 March 1871 – 10 January 1874
- Succeeded by: Julius Motteler

Personal details
- Born: Heinrich Reinhold Schraps; 3 August 1833 Leipzig, Kingdom of Saxony
- Died: 14 March 1917 (aged 83) Dresden, Kingdom of Saxony, German Empire
- Party: Saxon People's Party (1966-1969); German People's Party

Heinrich Reinhold Schraps (3 August 1833 – 14 March 1917) was a German lawyer and politician. He and August Bebel were the first two representatives of the Saxon People's Party, a predecessor party of the Social Democratic Party of Germany, elected to the Reichstag.

Although he was associated with early socialist politics, Schraps did not join the Social Democratic Workers' Party of Germany (SDAP) upon its formation in 1869. Instead, he later aligned with the German People's Party, reflecting his liberal democratic convictions. Schraps served in the Reichstag until 1874, advocating for democratic reforms and workers' rights during the formative years of the German Empire.

== Biography ==
Schraps was born in Leipzig, as the son of Johan Christian Schraps, a musician. He attended the Old St Nicholas School in Leipzig, and went on to study there from 1852 to 1856, at first philology and later jurisprudence. He practiced as a lawyer in Dresden from 1865, then in Crimmitschau from 1870, and again in Dresden from 1904.

He was an editor of a magazine called Reform, from 1865 until its ban in 1866. Schraps joined the Saxon People's Party in 1866, the same year it was founded. During election campaign before the February 1867 North German federal election, he advocated for cooperation with the German Progress Party in the talks with the General German Workers' Association, a proposition which was not received well and soured the relations between the two parties. His party fielded three candidates in the election: Wilhelm Liebknecht; August Bebel; and Schraps himself, of whom the latter two would get elected, with Schraps becoming the representative of Zwickau to the constituent Reichstag of the North German Confederation after receiving 57.7% of the vote in a run-off election against Lothar Streit of the German Progress Party (with conservative Bernhard von Uhde falling out of the race after the first round). The two socialists took seats on the extreme left of the parliament, with Bebel remarking that "to go any further would simply mean running their heads against the wall". The two voted against the North German Constitution, as it lacked in the recoginiton of basic laws, did not allow for direct taxes, and provided no ministerial accountability, instead enabling the Machtpolitik of Otto von Bismarck.

In the lead-up to the August 1867 North German federal election, the Saxon People's Party decided to once again field the three candidates from the previous election, this time joined by Ferdinand Goetz. They would win three mandates, with Schraps and Bebel winning re-election in their districts, and Liebknecht achieving his first electoral success. Schraps was elected in the first round of voting, with 64.9% of the vote.

The Saxon People's Party was dissolved in 1869, with its left-wing absorbed into the Social Democratic Workers' Party of Germany, yet another predecessor party to the Social Democratic Party of Germany. Schraps, however, did not participate in the switch to the new party, but voted with them against war credits in the Franco-Prussian War nonetheless and was fielded by them in the 1871 German federal election. Due to harsh anti-socialist campaigns by the Prussian and Saxon authorities, and their anti-war stance towards the ongoing conflict with France, only two of eighteen fielded candidates have won a mandate in the newly formed Reichstag of the German Empire (despite their number of votes increasing), with the two being, once again, Schraps and Bebel. Schraps won his constituency with 49.8% of the vote.

Within the Reichstag, Schraps submitted a motion for the release of Bebel from jail, and expressed his expectation that the German Empire would shift towards the political system of the Paris Commune within 20 years. However, his allegiance soon shifted towards the German People's Party, leaving Bebel the only socialist in the Reichstag. Nonetheless, he would once again propose for the release of Bebel, this time from his 1873 imprisonment, so that he could attend the ongoing session of the Reichstag. The motion was ultimately rejected. Schraps did not participate in the 1874 German federal election. He died in Dresden in 1917.

== Electoral history ==
Reichstag
Election year	Party	District	First round		Second round		Elected?
Election year	Party	District	# of votes	% of vote	# of votes	% of vote	Elected?
February 1867	Saxon People's Party	Saxony 18. Zwickau	6,970	46.9%	8,071	57.7%	Yes
August 1867	Saxon People's Party	Saxony 18. Zwickau	5,416	64.9%	—		Yes
1871	Social Democratic Workers' Party of Germany	Saxony 18. Zwickau	5,875	49.8%	—		Yes
