= February 1867 North German federal election =

- 12 February 1867

All 297 seats in the Reichstag 149 seats needed for a majority
- Turnout: ~65% (in Prussian constituencies)
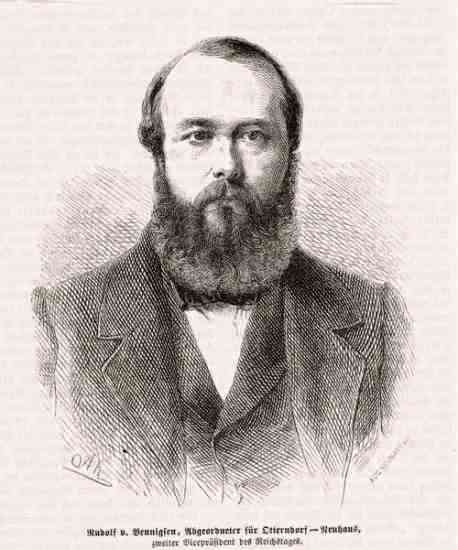

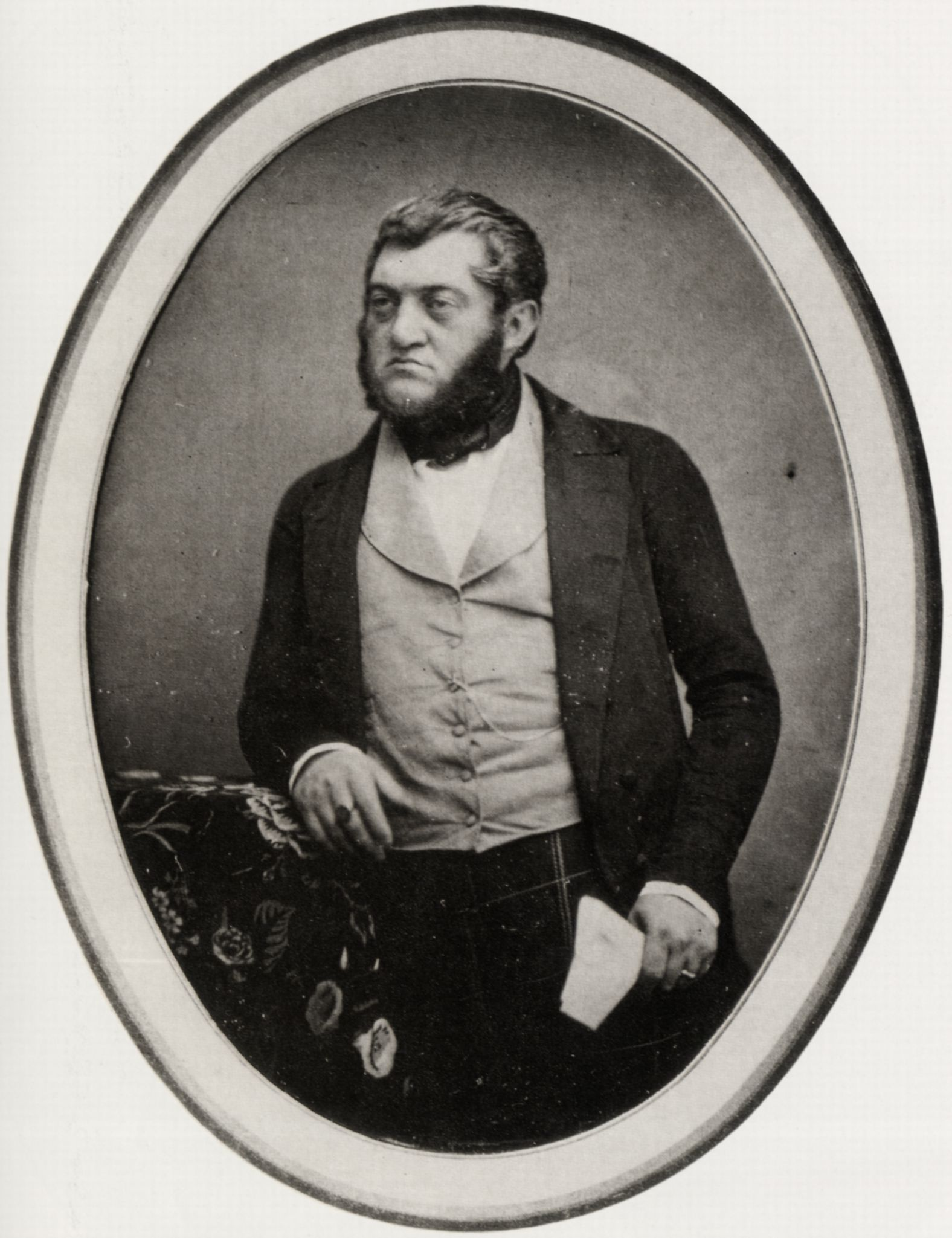

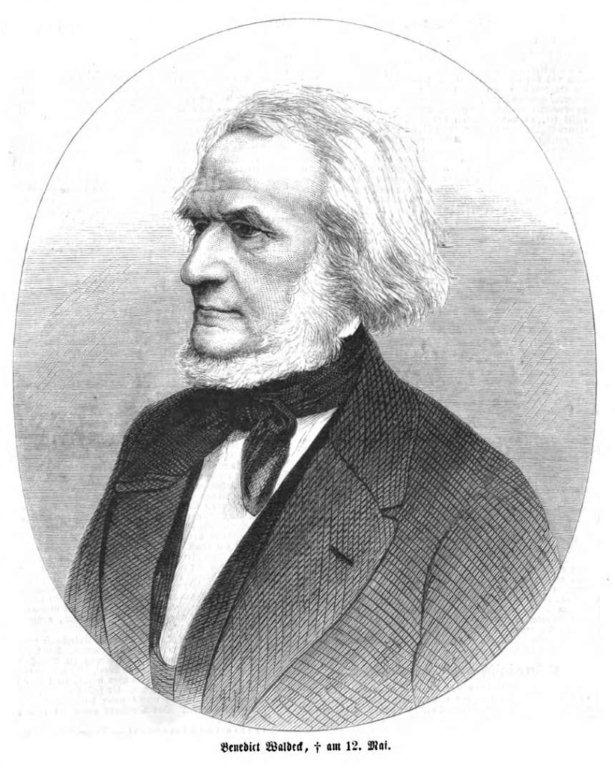
	First party	Second party	Third party
		DKP	DRP
Leader	Rudolf von Bennigsen		Eduard Georg von Bethusy-Huc (nominal)
Party	NlP	Conservatives	DRP
Leader since	1867		1866
Seats won	78	63	39
Popular vote	753,758	629,360	348,537
Percentage	20.19%	16.86%	9.33%
	Fourth party	Fifth party	Sixth party
			Polen
Leader	Georg von Vincke	Benedict Waldeck
Party	Old Liberals	DFP	Polish Party
Leader since	1858	1867
Seats won	31	19	13
Popular vote	265,670	276,321	209,382
Percentage	7.12%	7.40%	5.61%
- Map of results (by constituencies)
President of the Reichstag after election
Eduard von Simson
Independent

Elections to the Constituent Reichstag of the North German Confederation were held on 12 February 1867, with run-off elections during the following weeks. The National Liberal Party emerged as the largest party, winning 80 seats and receiving strong support in Hanover, Kassel and Nassau. Voter turnout was around 65% in Prussian constituencies. After the Constituent Reichstag had drawn up and agreed a constitution, fresh elections were held in August.

== Electoral system ==
The North German Confederation was divided into 297 single-member electoral constituencies. Elections were conducted under the two-round system. All men over the age of 25, who were in full enjoyment of their civil rights, who were resident in the place of election and had nationality in one of the States belonging to the Confederation for at least three years, who were not under guardianship or curate, who were not engaged in bankruptcy proceedings, and who were not in receipt of public assistance were eligible to vote.

== Results ==
The Free Conservative Party, the National Liberal Party, the German Progress Party, and the Old Liberals, all of them in support of the policies of Otto von Bismarck, won a clear majority of seats. On the other hand, in the recently annexed Prussian provinces of Schleswig-Holstein and Hanover, Federal-Constitutional candidates achieved electoral successes. The Saxon People's Party, the predecessor of the Social Democratic Party of Germany, entered the parliament with two representatives.

Party	Votes	%	Seats
National Liberal Party	753,758	20.19	78
Conservative Party	629,360	16.86	63
Other Liberals	379,499	10.16	0
Free Conservative Party	348,537	9.33	39
Independent Conservatives	345,965	9.27	9
Progress Party	276,321	7.40	19
Old Liberals	265,670	7.12	31
Polish Party	209,382	5.61	13
Independent Liberals	190,815	5.11	23
German-Hanoverian Party	111,781	2.99	9
Clericals	87,365	2.34	9
Danish Party	27,493	0.74	2
Saxon People's Party	22,918	0.61	2
General German Workers' Association	21,510	0.58	0
Lassallean General German Workers' Association	3,000	0.08	0
Others	39,341	1.05	0
Unknown	21,202	0.57	0
Total	3,733,917	100.00	297
Source: Wahlen in Deutschland

== Parliamentary groups ==
Two separate parliamentary groups would later be formed: the Free Association out of 11 liberals and 3 conservatives; and the Federalist-Constitutionalist Union, out of 7 Schleswig-Holstein particularist liberals, one other liberal, 4 clericals, all 9 German-Hanoverians, and one independent conservative.

== Elected representatives ==
=== Prussia ===
Kingdom of Prussia
Province of Prussia – Königsberg Region
1	Memel, Heydekrug	Helmuth von Moltke	KP
2	Labiau, Wehlau	Friedrich Karl of Prussia	Independent Conservative
3	Königsberg – City	Eduard Vogel von Falckenstein	KP
4	Königsberg – District, Fischhausen	Otto Karl von Hüllessem-Meerscheidt	KP
5	Heiligenbeil, Preußisch Eylau	Willibald von Kalckstein	KP
6	Braunsberg, Heilsberg	Adalbert Kraetzig	FKV
7	Preußisch Holland, Mohrungen	Alexander von Below	KP
8	Osterode, Neidenburg	Alexander von Lavergne-Peguilhen	KP
9	Allenstein, Rößel	August Uedinck	Old Liberal
10	Rastenburg, Friedland, Gerdauen	Max von Romberg	KP
Province of Prussia – Gumbinnen Region
1	Tilsit, Niederung	Otto von Keyserlingk zu Rautenburg	KP
2	Ragnit, Pillkallen	Hermann Schmalz	KP
3	Gumbinnen, Insterburg	Reinhardt Vieth	KP
4	Stallupoenen, Goldap, Darkehmen	Ferdinand Synold von Schüz	KP
5	Angerburg, Lötzen	Karl von Lehndorff	KP
6	Oletzko, Lyck, Johannisburg	George William von Simpson	KP
7	Sensburg, Ortelsburg	Gotthard von Tyszka	KP
Province of Prussia – Danzig Region
1	Marienburg, Elbląg	Wilhelm von Brauchitsch	KP
2	Danzig - District	Achatius von Auerswald	KP
3	Danzig - City	Heinrich Wilhelm Martens	Independent Liberal
4	Neustadt, Karthaus	Emil Czarliński	Pole
5	Berent, Preußisch Stargard	Hiacynt Jackowski	Pole
Province of Prussia – Marienwerder Region
1	Marienwerder, Stuhm	Teodor Donimirski	Pole
2	Rosenberg, Löbau	Siegfried von Brünneck-Bellschwitz	KP
3	Graudenz, Strasburg	Julius von Hennig	NLP
4	Thorn, Kulm	Friedrich Meyer	NLP
5	Schwetz	Alexander Wisselinck	NLP
6	Konitz	Feliks Dekowski	Pole
7	Schlochau, Flatow	Carl von Königsmarck	KP
8	Deutsch Krone	Botho zu Eulenburg	KP
Berlin
1	Alt-Berlin, Friedrichstadt - North, Cölln, Friedrichswerder, Dorotheenstadt	Eduard Lasker	NLP
2	Schöneberg, Friedrichsvorstadt, Friedrichstadt - South, Tempelhof	Benedikt Waldeck	DFP
3	Luisenstadt, Neukölln	Moritz Wiggers	DFP
4	Luisenstadt, Stralauer Vorstadt, Königsstadt - East	Heinrich Runge	DFP
5	Spandauer Vorstadt, Königsstadt - West, Friedrich-Wilhelm-Stadt	Franz Duncker	DFP
6	Wedding, Gesundbrunnen, Moabit, Oranienburger Vorstadt, Rosenthaler Vorstadt	Hermann Schulze-Delitzsch	DFP
Province of Brandenburg – Potsdam Region
1	Westprignitz	Julius von Jagow	Independent Conservative
2	Ostprignitz	Paul Persius	KP
3	Ruppin, Templin	Alfred von dem Knesebeck	FKV
4	Prenzlau, Angermünde	Oskar von Arnim-Kröchlendorff	FKV
5	Oberbarnim	Rudolf Pannier	NLP
6	Niederbarnim	Carl von Treskow	KP
7	Potsdam, Osthavelland	Gustav von Jagow	KP
8	Westhavelland	Ludwig von Bredow	KP
9	Zauch-Belzig, Jüterbog-Luckenwalde	Curt von Watzdorf	KP
10	Teltow, Beeskow-Storkow	Albrecht von Roon	KP
Province of Brandenburg – Frankfurt Region
1	Arnswalde, Friedeberg	Ludwig von Wedemeyer	KP
2	Landsberg, Soldin	Hermann Hans von Vaerst	NLP
3	Königsberg	Wilhelm Adolf Lette	NLP
4	Frankfurt, Lebus	Eduard von Simson	NLP
5	Sternberg	Eduard von Waldow und Reitzenstein	KP
6	Zullichau-Schwiebus, Crossen	Karl Friedrich von Steinmetz	KP
7	Guben, Lübben	Julius Wilhelm von Beerfelde	KP
8	Sorau	Henning von Puttkamer	NLP
9	Cottbus, Spremberg	Hans Köster	KP
10	Calau, Luckau	Friedrich zu Solms-Baruth	KP
Province of Pomerania – Stettin Region
1	Demmin, Anklam	Maximilian von Schwerin-Putzar	NLP
2	Ueckermünde, Usedom-Wollin	Otto Michaelis	NLP
3	Stettin – District, Greifenhagen	Otto Stavenhagen	KP
4	Stettin – City	Gustav Müller	Independent Liberal
5	Pyritz, Saatzig	Wilhelm von Schöning	KP
6	Naugard, Regenwalde	Moritz von Blanckenburg	KP
7	Greifenberg, Kammin	Gerhard von Thadden	KP
Province of Pomerania – Köslin Region
1	Stolp, Lauenburg	Hans Hugo Erdmann von Gottberg	KP
2	Bütow, Rummelsburg, Schlawe	Werner von Blumenthal-Suckow	KP
3	Fürstenthum	Carl Friedrich von Denzin	KP
4	Belgard, Schivelbein, Dramburg	Heinrich Leonhard von Arnim-Heinrichsdorf	KP
5	Neustettin	Hermann Wagener	KP
Province of Pomerania – Stralsund Region
1	Rügen, Franzburg	Bernhard Hinrichs	NLP
2	Greifswald, Grimmen	Eduard Baumstark	Old Liberal
Province of Posen – Posen Region
1	Posen	Stanisław Motty	Pole
2	Samter, Birnbaum, Obornik	Theodor von Bethmann-Hollweg	Old Liberal
3	Meseritz, Bomst	Hans Wilhelm von Unruhe-Bomst	FKV
4	Buk, Kosten	Stanisław Chłapowski	Pole
5	Kröben	Roman Czartoryski	Pole
6	Fraustadt	Maximilian von Puttkamer	NLP
7	Schrimm, Schroda	Zygmunt Szułdrzyński	Pole
8	Wreschen, Pleschen	Władysław Niegolewski	Pole
9	Krotoschin	Aleksander Graeve	Pole
10	Adelnau, Schildberg	Juliusz Pilaski	Pole
Province of Posen – Bromberg Region
1	Czarnikau, Chodziesen	Rudolf von Kehler	Old Liberal
2	Wirsitz, Schubin	Carl von Saenger	Old Liberal
3	Bromberg	Hermann von Leipziger	NLP
4	Inowrazlaw, Mogilno	Kazimierz Kantak	Pole
5	Gnesen, Wongrowitz	Leon Wegner	Pole
Province of Silesia – Breslau Region
1	Guhrau, Steinau, Wohlau	Leopold von Frankenberg-Ludwigsdorf	KP
2	Militsch, Trebnitz	August von Maltzan	FKV
3	Gross Wartenberg, Oels	Konrad Adolf von Dyhrn	Old Liberal
4	Namslau, Brieg	Gustav Riedel	Old Liberal
5	Ohlau, Strehlen, Nimptsch	Karl von Vincke	Old Liberal
6	Breslau – East	Max Simon	DFP
7	Breslau – West	Wilhelm Bouneß	DFP
8	Neumarkt, Breslau – District	Ernst Wachler	NLP
9	Strigau, Schweidnitz	Karl von Pückler-Burghauß	KP
10	Waldenburg	Leonor Reichenheim	NLP
11	Reichenbach, Neurode	Karl Twesten	NLP
12	Glatz, Habelschwerdt	Franz Künzer	FKV
13	Frankenstein, Münsterberg	Ludwig Gitzler	FKV
Province of Silesia – Oppeln Region
1	Kreuzburg, Rosenberg	Eduard Georg von Bethusy-Huc	FKV
2	Oppeln	Viktor I, Duke of Ratibor	FKV
3	Groß Strehlitz, Cosel	Johannes Maria von Renard	FKV
4	Lublinitz, Gleiwitz	Hugo zu Hohenlohe-Öhringen	FKV
5	Beuthen – North	Guido Henckel von Donnersmarck	NLP
6	Beuthen – South	Wilhelm Ulrich	Independent Catholic
7	Pleß, Rybnik	Hans von Pleß	FKV
8	Ratibor	Karl von Lichnowsky	FKV
9	Leobschütz	Wilhelm Wolff	Free Association
10	Neustadt	Hans von Oppersdorff	FKV
11	Falkenberg, Grottkau	Friedrich von Frankenberg und Ludwigsdorf	FKV
12	Neisse	Karl Rudolf Friedenthal	Old Liberal
Province of Silesia – Liegnitz Region
1	Grunberg, Freystadt	Ernst von Grävenitz	KP
2	Sagan, Sprottau	Hans zur Megede	Free Association
3	Glogau	Adalbert Falk	Old Liberal
4	Lüben, Bunzlau	Hermann zu Dohna-Kotzenau	NLP
5	Löwenberg	Georges von Cottenet	KP
6	Liegnitz, Goldberg-Haynau	Reinhold Aßmann	NLP
7	Landeshut, Jauer, Bolkenhain	Eberhard zu Stolberg-Wernigerode	KP
8	Schönau, Hirschberg	Richard Roepell	NLP
9	Görlitz, Lauban	Albert von Carlowitz	Free Association
10	Rothenburg, Hoyerswerda	Otto Theodor von Seydewitz	KP
Province of Saxony – Magdeburg Region
1	Salzwedel, Gardelegen	Werner von der Schulenburg-Beetzendorf	KP
2	Stendal, Osterburg	Wilhelm von Bismarck-Briest	KP
3	Jerichow	Otto von Bismarck	Independent Conservative
4	Magdeburg	Hans Victor von Unruh	NLP
5	Neuhaldensleben, Wolmirstedt	Max von Forckenbeck	NLP
6	Wanzleben	Wilhelm Franz	FKV
7	Aschersleben, Calbe	Adolph von Dietze	FKV
8	Halberstadt, Oschersleben, Wernigerode	Otto Graf zu Stolberg-Wernigerode	Independent Conservative
Province of Saxony – Merseburg Region
1	Liebenwerda, Torgau	Max von Seydewitz	KP
2	Schweinitz, Wittenberg	Ferdinand Lucke	KP
3	Bitterfeld, Delitzsch	Wilhelm von Rauchhaupt	KP
4	Halle (Saale), Saalkreis	Maximilian Duncker	Old Liberal
5	Mansfeld	Johann Gottfried Boltze	Old Liberal
6	Sangerhausen, Eckartsberga	Hermann Jüngken	NLP
7	Querfurt, Merseburg	Johannes Moritz Wölfel	NLP
8	Naumburg, Weißenfels, Zeitz	Lothar von Wurmb	KP
Province of Saxony – Erfurt Region
1	Nordhausen	Eugen Richter	DFP
2	Heiligenstadt, Worbis	Albrecht Bernhard Frantz	FKV
3	Mühlhausen, Langensalza, Weißensee	Friedrich Bernhard von Hagke	FKV
4	Erfurt, Schleusingen, Ziegenrück	Gustav Freytag	NLP
Province of Schleswig-Holstein
1	Hadersleben, Sonderburg	Hans Andersen Krüger	Dane
2	Apenrade, Flensburg	Nicolay Ahlmann	Dane
3	Schleswig, Eckernförde	Eduard von Baudissin	Federalist-Constitutionalist Union
4	Tondern, Husum, Eiderstedt	Carl Philipp Francke	Federalist-Constitutionalist Union
5	Dithmarschen, Steinburg	Adolf von Warnstedt	Federalist-Constitutionalist Union
6	Pinneberg, Segeberg	Friedrich Heinrich Otto Jensen	Federalist-Constitutionalist Union
7	Kiel, Rendsburg	Ludwig Christian Schrader	Federalist-Constitutionalist Union
8	Altona, Stormarn	Rudolf Schleiden	Federalist-Constitutionalist Union
9	Oldenburg in Holstein, Plön	Conrad Johann Bokelmann	Federalist-Constitutionalist Union
Duchy of Saxe-Lauenburg
1	Saxe-Lauenburg	Caspar Wulff	NLP
Province of Hanover
1	Emden, Leer, Norden, Weener	Ysaak Brons	Independent Liberal
2	Aurich, Wittmund,	Rudolph Schepler	KP
3	Meppen, Lingen, Bentheim, Aschendorf, Hümmling	Ludwig Windthorst	Federalist-Constitutionalist Union
4	Osnabrück, Bersenbrück, Iburg	Johannes von Miquel	NLP
5	Melle, Diepholz, Wittlage, Sulingen	Ernst von Hammerstein-Loxten	Federalist-Constitutionalist Union
6	Syke, Hoya, Verden, Achim	Wilhelm von Hammerstein	Federalist-Constitutionalist Union
7	Nienburg, Neustadt am Rübenberge, Fallingbostel, Stolzenau	Friedrich von Bothmer	Federalist-Constitutionalist Union
8	Hannover, Linden – City	Alexander von Münchhausen	Federalist-Constitutionalist Union
9	Hameln, Linden – District, Springe	Alexander von Rössing	Federalist-Constitutionalist Union
10	Hildesheim, Marienburg, Alfeld (Leine), Gronau	Hermann Roemer	NLP
11	Einbeck, Northeim, Osterode am Harz, Uslar	Adolf Ellissen	NLP
12	Göttingen, Duderstadt, Münden	Heinrich Albert Zachariä	Federalist-Constitutionalist Union
13	Goslar, Zellerfeld, Ilfeld	Hermann König	NLP
14	Gifhorn, Celle, Peine, Burgdorf	Gottlieb Planck	NLP
15	Lüchow, Uelzen, Dannenberg, Isenhagen	Ehrenreich Eichholz	Federalist-Constitutionalist Union
16	Lüneburg, Soltau, Winsen, Bleckede	Carl Erxleben	Federalist-Constitutionalist Union
17	Harburg, Rotenburg, Zeven, Lilienthal	August Grumbrecht	NLP
18	Stade, Geestemünde, Bremervörde, Osterholz, Blumenthal	Adolph Weber	NLP
19	Neuhaus (Oste), Hadeln, Lehe, Kehdingen, Jork	Rudolf von Bennigsen	NLP
Province of Westphalia – Münster Region
1	Tecklenburg, Steinfurt, Ahaus	Wilhelm Rohden	Free Association
2	Münster, Coesfeld	Karl von Kleinsorgen	Free Association
3	Borken, Recklinghausen	Adolph Winkelmann	Free Association
4	Lüdinghausen, Beckum, Warendorf	Hermann von Mallinckrodt	Federalist-Constitutionalist Union
Province of Westphalia – Minden Region
1	Minden, Lübbecke, Jadegebiet	Kuno von der Goltz	KP
2	Herford, Halle (Westfalen)	Karl von Bodelschwingh-Velmede	KP
3	Bielefeld, Wiedenbrück	Bernhard Bessel	KP
4	Paderborn, Büren	Reinhard Franz von und zu Brenken	FKV
5	Höxter, Warburg	Johann Kayser	Free Association
Province of Westphalia – Arnsberg Region
1	Wittgenstein, Siegen, Biedenkopf	Albert von Dörnberg	Old Liberal
2	Olpe, Arnsberg, Meschede	Peter Reichensperger	Independent Catholic
3	Altena, Iserlohn	Heinrich Wilhelm von Holtzbrinck	KP
4	Hagen	Georg von Vincke	Old Liberal
5	Bochum	Adolf von Pilgrim	FKV
6	Dortmund	Hermann Heinrich Becker	DFP
7	Hamm, Soest	Florens von Bockum-Dolffs	Free Association
8	Lippstadt, Brilon	Ferdinand von Galen	FKV
Province of Hesse-Nassau – Wiesbaden Region
1	Usingen, Idstein, Königstein, Höchst, Hochheim,	August Hergenhahn	NLP
2	Wiesbaden, Wehen, Langenschwalbach, Rüdesheim, Eltville	Karl Braun	NLP
3	St. Goarshausen, Braubach, Nastätten, Montabaur, Wallmerod, Nassau	Ludwig Born	NLP
4	Limburg, Weilburg, Diez, Runkel, Hadamar	Johannes Knapp	NLP
5	Dillenburg, Herborn, Rennerod, Marienberg, Selters, Hachenburg	Friedrich von Schwartzkoppen	NLP
6	Frankfurt	Mayer Carl von Rothschild	Independent Conservative
Province of Hesse-Nassau – Kassel Region
1	Rinteln, Hofgeismar, Wolfhagen	Friedrich Oetker	NLP
2	Kassel, Melsungen	Hermann Weigel	NLP
3	Fritzlar, Homberg, Ziegenhain	Eduard Wiegand	NLP
4	Eschwege, Schmalkalden, Witzenhausen	Richard Harnier	NLP
5	Marburg, Frankenberg, Kirchhain	Wilhelm Jungermann	NLP
6	Hersfeld, Rotenburg, Hünfeld	August Braun	NLP
7	Fulda, Schlüchtern, Gersfeld	Franz Rang	Free Association
8	Hanau, Gelnhausen	Wilhelm Schenck zu Schweinsberg	Old Liberal
Rhine Province – Köln Region
1	Köln – City	Eugen Theodor Thisse	Independent Catholic
2	Köln – District	Johann Peter Weygold	Free Association
3	Bergheim, Euskirchen	Clemens August Schröder	FKV
4	Rheinbach, Bonn	Carl Ludwig von Proff-Irnich	Free Association
5	Siegkreis, Waldbröl	Aloys Dauzenberg	Free Association
6	Mülheim, Gummersbach, Wipperfürth	Maximilian von Nesselrode-Ehreshoven	FKV
Rhine Province – Düsseldorf Region
1	Lennep, Mettmann	Heinrich von Sybel	NLP
2	Elberfeld, Barmen	Rudolf von Gneist	NLP
3	Solingen	Josef Lambert Trip	DFP
4	Düsseldorf	Alfred Groote	Independent Liberal
5	Essen	Friedrich Leopold Devens	FKV
6	Duisburg	Justus von Gruner	Independent Liberal
7	Moers, Rees	Hermann vom Rath	Old Liberal
8	Kleve, Geldern	Maximilian August von Loë	FKV
9	Kempen	Friedrich Michelis	Independent Catholic
10	Gladbach	Franz Josef Kratz	Free Association
11	Krefeld	Carl Hermann Kanngießer	NLP
12	Neuss, Grevenbroich	Hermann Seul	FKV
Rhine Province – Koblenz Region
1	Wetzlar, Altenkirchen	Ludwig zu Solms-Hohensolms-Lich	FKV
2	Neuwied	Clemens Hosius	NLP
3	Koblenz, St. Goar	Jakob Raitz von Frentz	FKV
4	Kreuznach, Simmern	Otto Agricola	FKV
5	Mayen, Ahrweiler	Ludwig Delius	NLP
6	Adenau, Cochem, Zell	Friedrich von Spankeren	NLP
Rhine Province – Trier Region
1	Daun, Bitburg, Prüm	Johann Jacob Alff-Becker	Independent Catholic
2	Wittlich, Bernkastel	Karl Eberhard Herwarth von Bittenfeld	KP
3	Trier	Eduard Puricelli	FKV
4	Saarlouis, Merzig, Saarburg	Karl Heyl	Independent Liberal
5	Saarbrücken	Otto Ludwig Krug von Nidda	FKV
6	Ottweiler, St. Wendel, Meisenheim	Carl Ferdinand von Stumm-Halberg	FKV
Rhine Province – Aachen Region
1	Schleiden, Malmedy, Montjoie	Carl Josef Holzer	FKV
2	Eupen, Aachen – District	Friedrich Bloemer	Independent Liberal
3	Aachen – City	Jacob Scherer	FKV
4	Düren, Jülich	Franz Jakob von Hilgers	Free Association
5	Geilenkirchen, Heinsberg, Erkelenz	Alfred Polycarp von Hompesch	FKV
Province of Hohenzollern
1	Sigmaringen, Hechingen, Haigerloch, Gammertingen	August Evelt	Old Liberal

=== Saxony ===
Kingdom of Saxony
1	Zittau, Herrnhut, Reichenau	Christian Riedel	DFP
2	Löbau, Schirgiswalde, Ebersbach	Heinrich Erdmann August von Thielau	FKV
3	Bautzen, Kamenz, Bischofswerda	Hermann von Salza	FKV
4	Dresden – right bank of Elbe, Radeberg, Radeburg	Friedrich Oskar von Schwarze	Old Liberal
5	Dresden – left bank of Elbe	Franz Jacob Wigard	DFP
6	Dresden – District, Dippoldiswalde, Wilsdruff	Wilhelm Michael Schaffrath	DFP
7	Meissen, Großenhain, Riesa	Ludwig von Zehmen	FKV
8	Pirna, Sebnitz, Schandau	Theodor Reuning	Old Liberal
9	Freiberg, Hainichen, Frauenstein	Friedrich Raimund Sachße	Old Liberal
10	Döbeln, Nossen, Leisnig	Wilhelm Oehmichen	Independent Liberal
11	Oschatz, Wurzen, Grimma	Theodor Günther	Independent Liberal
12	Leipzig – City	Carl Georg von Wächter	Independent Liberal
13	Leipzig – District, Taucha, Markranstädt, Zwenkau	Carl Friedrich von Gerber	Old Liberal
14	Borna, Geithain, Rochlitz	Karl Wilhelm Gebert	Old Liberal
15	Mittweida, Frankenberg, Augustusburg	Ludwig Haberkorn	Independent Conservative
16	Chemnitz	Franz Xaver Rewitzer	DFP
17	Glauchau, Meerane, Hohenstein-Ernstthal	August Bebel	SVP
18	Zwickau, Crimmitschau, Werdau	Reinhold Schraps	SVP
19	Stollberg, Schneeberg, Geyer	Heinrich Minckwitz	DFP
20	Marienberg, Sayda, Zschopau	Eli Evans	DFP
21	Annaberg, Schwarzenberg, Johanngeorgenstadt	Scipio Agricola Herbig	Old Liberal
22	Auerbach, Lengenfeld, Reichenbach	Julius Leonhard Heubner	DFP
23	Plauen, Oelsnitz, Klingenthal	Karl Braun	Old Liberal

=== Other states ===
Grand Duchy of Hesse (Province of Upper Hesse only)
1	Giessen, Grünberg, Nidda	Adalbert Nordeck zur Rabenau	Old Liberal
2	Friedberg, Büdingen, Vilbel	Georg Buderus	NLP
3	Lauterbach, Alsfeld, Schotten	Otto zu Solms-Laubach	Old Liberal
Grand Duchy of Mecklenburg-Schwerin
1	Hagenow, Grevesmühlen	Otto Wachenhusen	NLP
2	Schwerin, Wismar	Edo Heinrich von Thünen	NLP
3	Parchim, Ludwigslust	Ludwig Georg von Oertzen	Independent Conservative
4	Malchin, Waren	Henning von Bassewitz	Independent Conservative
5	Rostock, Doberan	Karl Prosch	NLP
6	Güstrow, Ribnitz	Julius Wiggers	NLP
Grand Duchy of Saxe-Weimar-Eisenach
1	Weimar, Apolda	Hugo Friedrich Fries	NLP
2	Eisenach, Dermbach	Hermann Hering	NLP
3	Jena, Neustadt an der Orla	Christian Bernhard von Watzdorf	Independent Liberal
Grand Duchy of Mecklenburg-Strelitz
	Neustrelitz, Neubrandenburg, Schönberg	Franz Pogge	NLP
Grand Duchy of Oldenburg
1	Oldenburg, Eutin, Birkenfeld	Carl Julius Dannenberg	NLP
2	Jever, Brake, Westerstede, Varel, Elsfleth, Landwürden	Hermann Gerhard Müller	NLP
3	Vechta, Delmenhorst, Cloppenburg, Wildeshausen, Friesoythe	Arnold Kitz	Federalist-Constitutionalist Union
Duchy of Brunswick
1	Braunschweig, Blankenburg	Wilhelm Bode	NLP
2	Helmstedt, Wolfenbüttel	Adolf Ernst Theodor Müller	NLP
3	Holzminden, Gandersheim	Albert Schmid	NLP
Duchy of Saxe-Meiningen
1	Meiningen, Hildburghausen	Julius Hoffmann	NLP
2	Sonneberg, Saalfeld	Eduard Rückert	NLP
Duchy of Saxe-Altenburg
	Altenburg, Roda	Gustav Richard Wagner	NLP
Duchy of Saxe-Coburg and Gotha
1	Coburg	Friedrich Forkel	NLP
2	Gotha	Carl Ausfeld	DFP
Duchy of Anhalt
1	Dessau, Zerbst	August Köppe	NLP
2	Bernburg, Köthen, Ballenstedt	Gustav Holzmann	NLP
Principality of Schwarzburg-Rudolstadt
	Königsee, Frankenhausen	Adolph Baumbach	NLP
Principality of Schwarzburg-Sondershausen
	Sondershausen, Arnstadt, Gehren, Ebeleben	Günther Keyser	Old Liberal
Principality of Waldeck and Pyrmont
	Waldeck, Pyrmont	Ludwig Severin	NLP
Principality of Reuss Elder Line
	Greiz, Burgk	Karl Salzmann	NLP
Principality of Reuss Younger Line
	Gera, Schleiz	Karl Bernhard Jäger	NLP
Principality of Schaumburg-Lippe
	Bückeburg, Stadthagen	Julius Martin Weißich	NLP
Principality of Lippe
	Detmold, Lemgo	Alexander von Oheimb	KP
Hanseatic City of Lübeck
	Lübeck	Christoph Gotthard Görtz	NLP
Free Hanseatic City of Bremen
	Bremen, Bremerhaven	Hermann Heinrich Meier	NLP
Free and Hanseatic City of Hamburg
1	Neustadt, St. Pauli	Charles Ami de Chapeaurouge	NLP
2	Altstadt, St. Georg, Hammerbrook	Anton Rée	DFP
3	Bergedorf, Ritzebüttel	Robert Miles Sloman	NLP
