= Juliusz Pilaski =

Polish lawyer and politician

Member of the Landtag of Prussia House of Lords
- In office 1849–1853

House of Representatives
- In office 1882–1853

Member of the Reichstag of the North German Confederation for Odolanów and Ostrzeszów (Posen 10)
- In office 3 March 1871 – 12 February 1867
- Preceded by: Constituency established
- Succeeded by: Piotr Szembek

Personal details
- Born: Fryderyk Wilhelm Juliusz Pilaski; 3 February 1803 Poznań, Kingdom of Prussia
- Died: 27 March 1883 (aged 80) Poznań, Kingdom of Prussia, German Empire
- Party: Polish Party

Fryderyk Wilhelm Juliusz Pilaski (3 February 1803 – 27 March 1883) was a Polish lawyer, landowner, and a member of the Reichstag of the North German Confederation.

== Biography ==
Pilaski was born in Poznań to a Germanized, Protestant family of Alfons Pilaski, the owner of Zieliniec. Having attended Saint Mary Magdalene Gymnasium in Poznań, he went on to study law in Berlin. From 1831 to 1861 he worked at the District Court in Posen as assessor, judge, and a councilman.

After a push by Polish citizens of Poznań, Pilaski was elected, along with 13 other Poles, to its city council. He was a member of the Landtag of Prussia continuously from 1849 to 1882, first in the House of Lords until 1853, and later on in the House of Representatives, where he was one of the most active representatives of the Polish Parliamentary Group. During the debate on what would become the 1850 Constitution of Prussia, Pilaski, together with other Polish parliamentarians, demanded an inclusion of a guarantee for the autonomy of the Grand Duchy of Posen, and adoption of a law protecting Polish minority rights. Their demands were ultimately denied.

In 1851 he sold Nietuszkowo, which he had bought at an earlier point from Wawrzyniec Grabowski, to Karl von Oven. He would also go on to sell Zieliniec in 1881.

Pilaski was elected to the Reichstag of the North German Confederation in February 1867 as the representative of Odolanów and Ostrzeszów. He voted against the North German Constitution. He was reelected in August 1867 in the same district, representing Polish Parliamentary Group. He died in Poznań in 1883, where he was buried at an evangelical cemetery.
