= Julius Motteler =

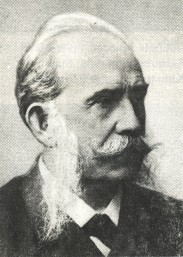
- Born: 18 June 1838; Esslingen am Neckar, Württemberg
- Died: 29 September 1907 (aged 69); Leipzig, Saxony, Germany
- Occupations: Political activist; Pioneer socialist
- Political party: SPD and various precursor parties
- Spouse(s): 1. Emilie Henriette Kyber; 2. Emilie Schwarze
- Children: 1s

Julius Motteler (18 June 1838 – 29 September 1907) was a pioneering German Socialist and businessman.

Julius Motteler was a leading member of the early German Labour movement and was repeatedly elected a member of the Reichstag (German national parliament). During the period 1878 - 1890, defined politically in Germany by the Anti-Socialist Laws, he organised the party's underground press activities. He was also instrumental in the establishment of trades unions in Germany, and an early champion of the Proletarian Women's Movement (Proletarische Frauenbewegung). He was a member of the inner circle of left wing leaders that also included August Bebel and Wilhelm Liebknecht.

Motteler was a member of the Social Democratic Party, having already been a co-founder of several predecessor political parties, the Saxon People's Party, the Social Democratic Workers' Party and the German Socialist Worker's Party (Sozialistische Arbeiterpartei Deutschlands / SAP).

== Life ==
=== Early years ===
Julius Motteler was born the ninth of twelve children in Esslingen, some ten miles (16 km) southeast of Stuttgart. His father was a prosperous hotelier. The boy attended the Pädagogium (school) in Esslingen and prepared for a career as a teacher. However, his father died in July 1848 and four years later, in 1852, Julius Motteler quit the local teacher training college and embarked on an apprenticeship in the weaving trade.

After he had completed his military service Motteler, who was by now a qualified weaver and textile (buckskin) worker, and also had some commercial training, moved to Augsburg in Bavaria where he gained experience as a book keeper and factory manager. He relocated again in 1859, this time to Saxony, taking a job in September of that year as a dispatcher and book keeper with a textiles company called "Vigonespinnerei Wolf & Kirsten" in Crimmitschau near Zwickau.

=== Socialist beginnings ===
In Saxony Motteler increasingly focused on trades union and political activities. In 1860 he joined the politically liberal German National Association, itself a precursor to a political party. This was where he first met August Bebel. In 1863 he was one of the founders of the Arbeiterbildungsverein (Workers' Educational Association) in Crimmitschau, which quickly became part of a nationwide movement. In the same year, with the creation of the Verband Deutscher Arbeitervereine ("Association of German Workers' Associations"), he gave expression to a separation of the workers' movement from what socialist innovators of the time would have identified as "Bourgeois liberalism". He adopted the programme drawn up by Karl Marx for the First International as a political road map. In 1866 he was a founding member with August Bebel and Wilhelm Liebknecht of the Saxon People's Party.

The next year he lost his job with "Wolf & Kirsten" who objected to his election campaigning, and joined "Spinn- und Webgenossenschaft Ernst Stehfest & Co", still in Crimmitschau, working as a buyer. He was not alone in losing his job for political reasons, and his new employer was a co-operative enterprise, founded on 8 July 1867 by a number of textile workers who had lost their previous jobs for political campaigning. he sector and the region were booming, and the new enterprise was initially successful, but it closed through insolvency in 1876. Motteler had stood as a guarantor for the cooperative.

In 1867 Julius Motteler and Karl Wilhelm Stolle jointly established the "Crimmitschau Republican People's Union" ("Crimmitschauer Republikanischen Volksverein"), as the local branch of the Saxon People's Party. He played a part in sending workers' delegates to the Reichstag of the short-lived North German Confederation. In 1869 he participated, with August Bebel, in the founding in Eisenach of the Social Democratic Workers' Party (Sozialdemokratische Arbeiterpartei Deutschlands / SDAP), which turned out to be a precursor of the SPD. Shortly afterwards he established a local party branch in Crimmitschau, in 1868 dissolving the local Arbeiterbildungsverein (Workers' Educational Association) to make way for the new SDAP.

In May 1869 Motteler was a founder, in Leipzig, of the "Trades Union of Manufacturing, Industrial and Craft workers of both sexes" ("Gewerksgenossenschaft der Manufactur-, Fabrik- und Handarbeiter beiderlei Geschlechts") which quickly became one of the country's largest trades unions, although it proved short-lived, being closed down by the police on 10 December 1878, after the legislators outlawed trades unions in 1878. Nevertheless, in the longer term this union can be seen as a forerunner of the German Textile Workers' Union ("Deutscher Textilarbeiterverband") founded in 1891 following the lifting of the Anti-Socialist Laws (although later closed down by the Nazis in 1933).

In addition to campaigning actively for women's rights long before most of the issues involved found their way into mainstream socialist politics, Motteler also argued vehemently against the use of child labour in factories. He actively backed the creation of various consumer cooperatives, workers' associations and labour unions. With Stolle, in 1870 he founded a co-operative printing press to produce the "Crimmitschau Citizens' and Farmers' Friend" ("Crimmitschauer Bürger- und Bauernfreund"), identified by some as Germany's first regional Social Democratic newspaper. During the 1870s he was involved with the establishment of a printing co-operative in Leipzig between 1874 and 1876, and in Barmen in 1877. He resigned from chairmanship of the Leipzig 1876 for personal reasons in 1876.

=== National politics ===
Following unification, in 1874 Julius Motteler was elected to the Reichstag for the Social Democratic Workers' Party (Sozialdemokratische Arbeiterpartei Deutschlands / SDAP), one of several parties which underwent successive mergers to become, in 1890, the Social Democratic Party of Germany (SPD). He was elected to represent the "Zwickau Werdau Glauchau Crimmitschau" electoral district. On 22 May 1875 was one of the founders of the German Socialist Worker's Party (Sozialistische Arbeiterpartei Deutschlands / SAP) which resulted from the merger of the SDAP with the General German Workers' Association (Allgemeiner Deutscher Arbeiter-Verein / ADAV). He sat as a Reichstag member for the combined party till he lost his seat in 1878.

By 1878 the chancellor, whose tolerance of liberalism and socialism had always may always have been largely tactical, felt able to revert to the comfortable conservatism of the Junker class into which he had been born. The "Gesetz gegen die gemeingefährlichen Bestrebungen der Sozialdemokratie" known in English language sources as the Anti-Socialist Laws was/were one particularly far-reaching manifestation. A more personal manifestation of the new political climate followed a speech Motteler gave on 4 and 5 June 1878 in which he protested against state sponsored defamation of the SDAP. The speech, which came in the wake of two serious (albeit failed) assassination attempts against the Kaiser was very widely reported. As the political heat increased Motteler found himself arrested in Stuttgart on 29 September 1878 and charged with "Kaiserbeleidigung" (disrespecting the Kaiser): however, he was acquitted. Later in 1878 he relocated - as matters turned out briefly - to the Nymphenburg district of Munich.

=== Zürich exile, London exile ===
"Was Motteler für den ersten, schweren Aufbau und Ausbau der sozialdemokratischen Partei, was er für die Anfänge der proletarischen Frauenbewegung geleistet, würde hinreichen, seinen Namen die Unvergessenheit zu sichern. Es tritt jedoch zurück hinter seinem illegalen Werk in den Jahren des Sozialistengesetzes... Als "Roter Feldpostmeister" hat Motteler Wertvollstes, Unvergeßliches geleistet. ..."
"What Motteler contributed to the initial, difficult creation and development of the [German]" Social Democratic Party, along with what he did to get the proletarian women's movement going, are more than enough to secure his name a permanent place in history. Yet those things pale into insignificance when set against his illegal work during the period of the Anti-Socialist Laws ... It was as the "Red army postmaster" that Motteler's most valuable and never-to-be-forgotten work was done.

Socialist pioneer Clara Zetkin, (1928, Moscow).
Zetkin was a member of the group of exiled Social Democrats in Zürich before her move to Paris in 1882, and who herself worked in Motteler's newspaper distribution team between September 1882 and January 1883

The Anti-Socialist Laws that came into force in October 1878 were a watered down version of the original proposal that Bismarck had tried, and failed, to get through the Reichstag in May 1878. They nevertheless included or were accompanied by a range of repressive measures including the outlawing of trades unions and the closing down of 45 leftwing journals and newspapers. Social Democrats responded by standing for election not as SAP members but as independent candidates, while a number of prominent party members relocated to Switzerland where there was no ban on producing Social Democratic newspapers for distribution in Germany. Motteler moved, with his wife Emilie, to Zürich in November 1879 from where he organised the production of Der Sozialdemokrat (a weekly newspaper), and its distribution into Württemberg and from there, using an increasingly sophisticated network of trusted "Red postmen", right across Germany, earning himself the soubriquet "der Roter Feldpostmeister" ("The red army postmaster"). From Zürich he also headed up "Schwarzen Maske" ("Black Masks"), a counter-espionage outfit intended to counteract German spying activities against the group of exiled social democrats in Switzerland. Motteler's management experience, his meticulous attention to detail and his sheer talent for conspiratorial organisation were important to the success of the newspaper venture, and also enabled him to unmask several German government spies operating within the group. Although, or possibly because, distribution in Germany of the newspaper printed in Switzerland took place outside the law, the 1880s saw a maintained, and in the view of some commentators an intensified national Social Democratic identity in which the activities of the Zürich exiles played an important part.

Someone who undoubtedly appreciated the effectiveness of the Social Democratic caucus in exile was the German Chancellor who eventually managed to persuade the Swiss national government to expel the team producing "Der Sozialdemokrat". The team arrived in London in June 1888, accompanied by 16 large crates of scrupulously archived and indexed documentation. "Der Sozialdemokrat" was printed in London from October 1888 till September 1890. By this time relations within the team producing the newspaper had become acutely frayed, while back in Germany Bismarck had finally retired, in March 1890. The retirement came about after the Reichstag had refused, in January 1890, to renew the Anti-Socialist Laws, which had come to be seen increasingly as wrong, ineffective or counter-productive. Early in 1891 Julius Motteler organised the crating up and transfer to Berlin of a portion of the by now prodigious "archive" accumulated during the years of exile. He nevertheless retained many of the party records, since for Motteler himself the London exile was not over. His listing, in German police files, as an outlaw was not at this point rescinded, and he therefore continued, with fellow exile Eduard Bernstein to operate from London a highly effective branch in exile of the Social Democratic Party which was now relegitimised in Germany.

=== Return from exile ===
Motteler and Germany were finally able to return to Germany in 1901. Thanks to their enforced absence they had been unable to play a leading role in the SPD's formative decade. Motteler was accompanied by more Social Democratic documentation, and he also organised the repatriation of all the archived documents from the Marx-Engels of which he had been given charge following the death, in exile in London in August 1895, of Friedrich Engels. On returning to Germany Motteler immediately returned to the newspaper business, becoming the printing manager and publishing director of the Leipziger Volkszeitung (newspaper). In the 1903 General Election he won a Leipzig seats for the Social Democrats, and he sat in the Reichstag till 1907. He died a few months after the 1907 election, having remained active as a social democratic activist and newspaper manager almost to the end.

== Personal ==
Between 1870 and 1878 Julius Motteler was married to Emilie Henriette Kyber from Crimmitschau. Later he was married to Emilie Schwarze from Esslingen. With his first wife he had one recorded son, who died of Typhus in 1879.
