= 1867 North German federal election =

The 1867 North German federal election may refer to:

- February 1867 North German federal election
- August 1867 North German federal election
