= 1871 German federal election =

- 3 March 1871

All 382 seats in the Reichstag 192 seats needed for a majority
- Registered: 7,656,283
- Turnout: 3,905,531 (51.01%)
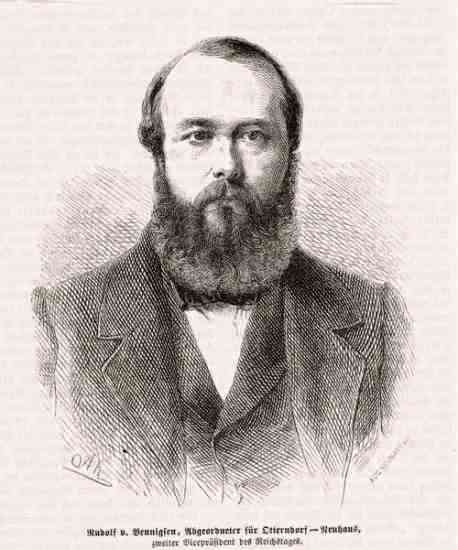

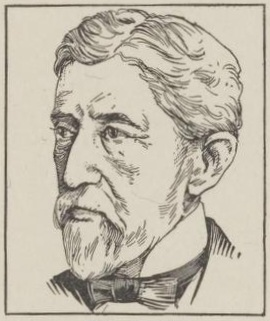

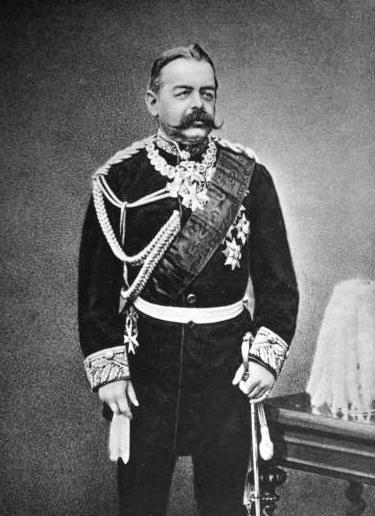

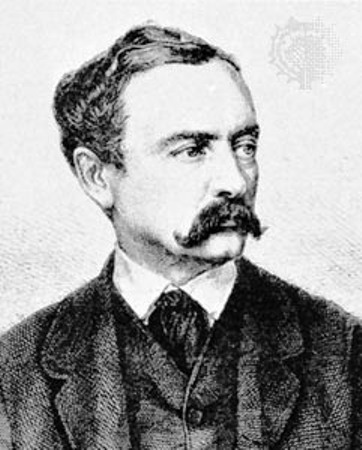
	First party	Second party	Third party
			Con
Leader	Rudolf von Bennigsen	Hermann von Mallinckrodt
Party	NlP	Centre	Conservatives
Leader since	1867	1870
Last election	23.28%, 104 seats	Did not exist	14.82%, 65 seats
Seats won	117	58	56
Seat change	▲13	New party	▼9
Popular vote	1,125,942	707,896	524,881
Percentage	28.97%	18.21%	13.51%
Swing	▲5.69 pp	New party	▼1.31 pp
	Fourth party	Fifth party	Sixth party
	DFP
Leader		Viktor I, Duke of Ratibor	Chlodwig Hohenlohe-Schillingsfürst
Party	DFP	DRP	LRP
Leader since			1871
Last election	8.75%, 31 seats	6.67%, 37 seats	Did not exist
Seats won	45	37	33
Seat change	▲14	0	New party
Popular vote	351,209	343,098	274,068
Percentage	9.04%	8.83%	7.05%
Swing	▲0.29 pp	▲2.16 pp	New party
- Map of results (by constituencies)
President of the Zollparlament before election
Eduard von Simson
National Liberal Party
President of the Reichstag
after election
Eduard von Simson
National Liberal Party

A federal election for the first Reichstag of the German Empire was held on 3 March 1871, 45 days after the founding of the Empire. The voting took place under the provisions of the short-lived Constitution of the German Confederation. With certain limitations, all German males over 25 years of age were eligible to vote.

The National Liberal Party, one of the key supporters of the German unification of 1871, emerged as the largest party in the Reichstag. The newly founded Catholic Centre Party came in second. Voter turnout was 51%.

The Reichstag approved the new Constitution of the German Empire on 14 April 1871. It set the legislative period at three years, putting the next election in 1874.

== Historical background ==
At the end of the Austro-Prussian War of 1866, the victorious Kingdom of Prussia annexed many of the smaller north German states to form the North German Confederation. The North German Constitution, which reflected the political ideas of Prussian minister president Otto von Bismarck, included a Reichstag elected according to equal, secret and universal manhood suffrage.

With minor modifications, the North German Constitution became the Constitution of the German Confederation on 1 January 1871, during the final days of the Franco-Prussian War. The Confederation's 297-member Reichstag, last elected in August 1867, was expanded by 85 seats to accommodate the four south German states (Baden, Hesse south of the Main River, Württemberg and Bavaria) that were joining the Confederation to form what would become the German Empire on 18 January.

== Electoral system ==
The election was held under general, equal, direct and secret suffrage. All German males over the age of 25 years were able to vote except for active members of the military and recipients of poor relief. The restrictions on the military were meant to keep it from becoming politicized, while men on relief were considered to be open to political manipulation. The constitutional guarantee of a secret vote was not safeguarded at the time, since ballot boxes and polling booths were not introduced until 1903.

If no candidate in a district won an absolute majority of the votes, a runoff election was held between the first- and second-place finishers. It was possible for a replacement candidate to be introduced in a runoff.

== Major political parties ==
It was common at the time for individuals to campaign not as a member of a specific party but rather under a more general label such as liberal, conservative, clerical or particularist. Once the parliament met, such members would join an existing party or work with like-minded representatives to form a new one. As a result, the picture of a new Reichstag's party makeup would come into focus only some time after the voting.

Liberalism, supported primarily by the middle class, was the leading political movement at the time of the Empire's foundation. It was divided into two large ideological groups, the liberal left, of which the German Progress Party (DFP) was the largest party, and national liberalism, centered in the National Liberal Party (NLP). Both parties had supported Bismarck's unification policies, although the NLP was more consistent in its backing of the Chancellor.

The two main conservative parties were the German Conservative Party and the German Reich Party. They backed Bismarck and found their primary support among the nobility and large landowners in the eastern states.

The Catholic Centre Party was founded following the election for the Prussian House of Representatives in November 1870. On 23 March 1871, a group of Catholic members of the newly elected Reichstag came together to form a Centre Party parliamentary caucus. The party's membership was almost exclusively Catholic and, unlike most parties of the time, spanned the full range of social classes. The Centre's party program for 1871, entitled "Justice is the basis of governance", promised to protect the federal nature of the Empire and strive for the "constitutional establishment of guarantees of the civic and religious freedom of all citizens".

The Imperial Liberal Party formed after the 1871 election as a liberal-conservative offshoot of the National Liberal Party. It was a party of notables (Honoratiorenpartei) that supported Bismarck, rejected parliamentarization and sought to work with both the National Liberals and the Conservative Party.

The Social Democratic Workers Party (SDAP) had favored a greater German unification (one which would have included Austria) and during the Franco-Prussian War had advocated "proletarian internationalism". In its founding Eisenach Program of 1869, the party promised to fight for the abolition of class rule, elimination of the capitalist mode of production, a standard working day, and the prohibition of child labor.

The Polish Party represented the approximately three million German citizens whose native language was Polish. Most of them lived in the Prussian provinces of Posen, West Prussia and Silesia.

== Results ==
The parties that supported Bismarck's policies, notably on unification, became the dominant parties in the new Reichstag: the National Liberals, Centre, Conservatives and Progress Party.

Voter turnout was just 51%, the lowest during the life of the Empire. Historian Volker Ullrich suggests that the lack of voter interest was due to the fact that the initial enthusiasm over the founding of the Empire remained limited primarily to the national-liberal bourgeoisie.

The changes in the results from the previous Reichstag (shown below) are a combination of two previous elections: to the North German Reichstag in 1867 and to the Zollparlament, the parliament of the German Customs Union (Zollverein), in 1868. The Zollparlament consisted of all members of the North German Reichstag plus 85 representatives elected from the south German states that joined the German Empire in 1871. They received as many seats in the new Reichstag as they had held in the Zollparlament.

Graph of the party split among 382 seats.
Party	Votes	%	+/–	Seats	+/–
National Liberal Party	1,125,942	28.97	+5.69	117	+13
Centre Party	707,896	18.21	New	58	New
Conservative Party	524,881	13.51	−1.31	56	−9
German Progress Party	351,209	9.04	+0.29	45	+14
German Reich Party	343,098	8.83	+2.16	37	0
Imperial Liberal Party	274,068	7.05	New	33	New
Polish Party	176,342	4.54	−0.52	13	+2
Independent Liberals	74,903	1.93	−9.05	5	−27
German-Hanoverian Party	73,470	1.89	+1.01	7	+3
General German Workers' Association	56,117	1.44	−0.27	0	−2
Social Democratic Workers' Party	41,040	1.06	−0.19	1	−1
German People's Party	29,595	0.76	−1.23	1	−7
Old Liberals	24,900	0.64	−2.79	2	−16
Danish Party	21,143	0.54	−0.23	1	0
Clericals	15,329	0.39	−9.21	3	−33
Independent conservatives	14,805	0.38	−9.64	1	+1
Schleswig-Holstein Particularist Liberals	6,968	0.18	−1.03	2	−6
Lassallean General German Workers' Association	4,770	0.12	−0.02	0	−1
Saxon Particularist Conservatives	1,549	0.04	−0.06	0	0
Others	17,596	0.45	−0.84	0	0
Unknown	894	0.02	−0.07	0	0
Total	3,886,515	100.00	–	382	+85
Valid votes	3,886,515	99.51			
Invalid/blank votes	19,016	0.49			
Total votes	3,905,531	100.00			
Registered voters/turnout	7,656,283	51.01			
Source: Wahlen in Deutschland

== Aftermath ==
The first meeting of the imperial Reichstag, whose provisional home was the Prussian House of Representatives, took place in the White Hall of the Berlin Palace, the residence of the kings and emperors of Prussia. Emperor Wilhelm I chose to welcome the Reichstag members there because he did not want to give the impression that he had his subjects to thank for the crown. The throne of the Holy Roman Emperor Henry III had been brought from Goslar for the occasion, and the victorious Prussian generals, led by Helmuth von Moltke, carried the imperial regalia.

The Reichstag approved the new Constitution of the German Empire with just seven 'no' votes on 14 April 1871. It went into effect on 4 May. In one other significant vote, taken on 11 March 1872, the Reichstag replaced church with state supervision of German schools.

The next election was held on 10 January 1874 in accordance with the constitutional three-year term of office for Reichstag members. It was changed to five years in 1888.
