= 1878 German federal election =

- 30 July 1878

All 397 seats in the Reichstag 199 seats needed for a majority
- Registered: 9,128,305 ▲2.07%
- Turnout: 5,780,996 (63.33%) ▲2.69pp
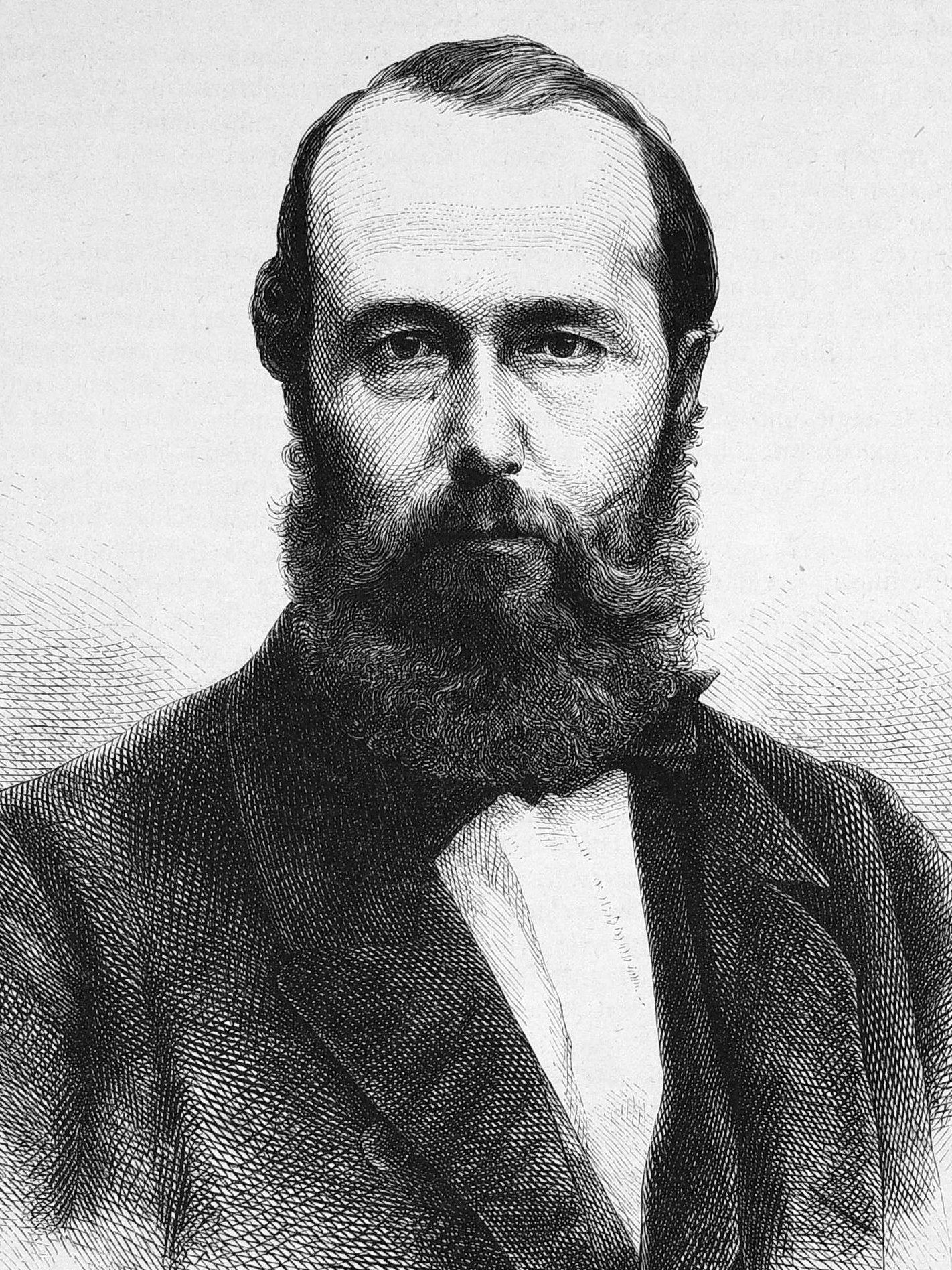

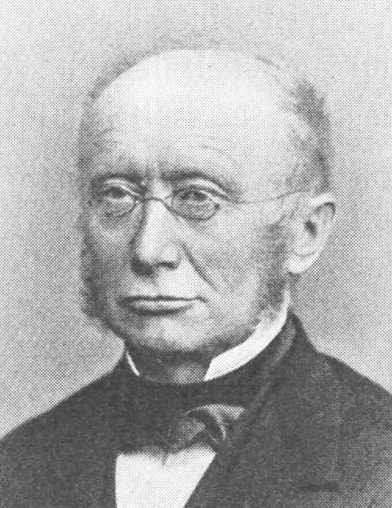

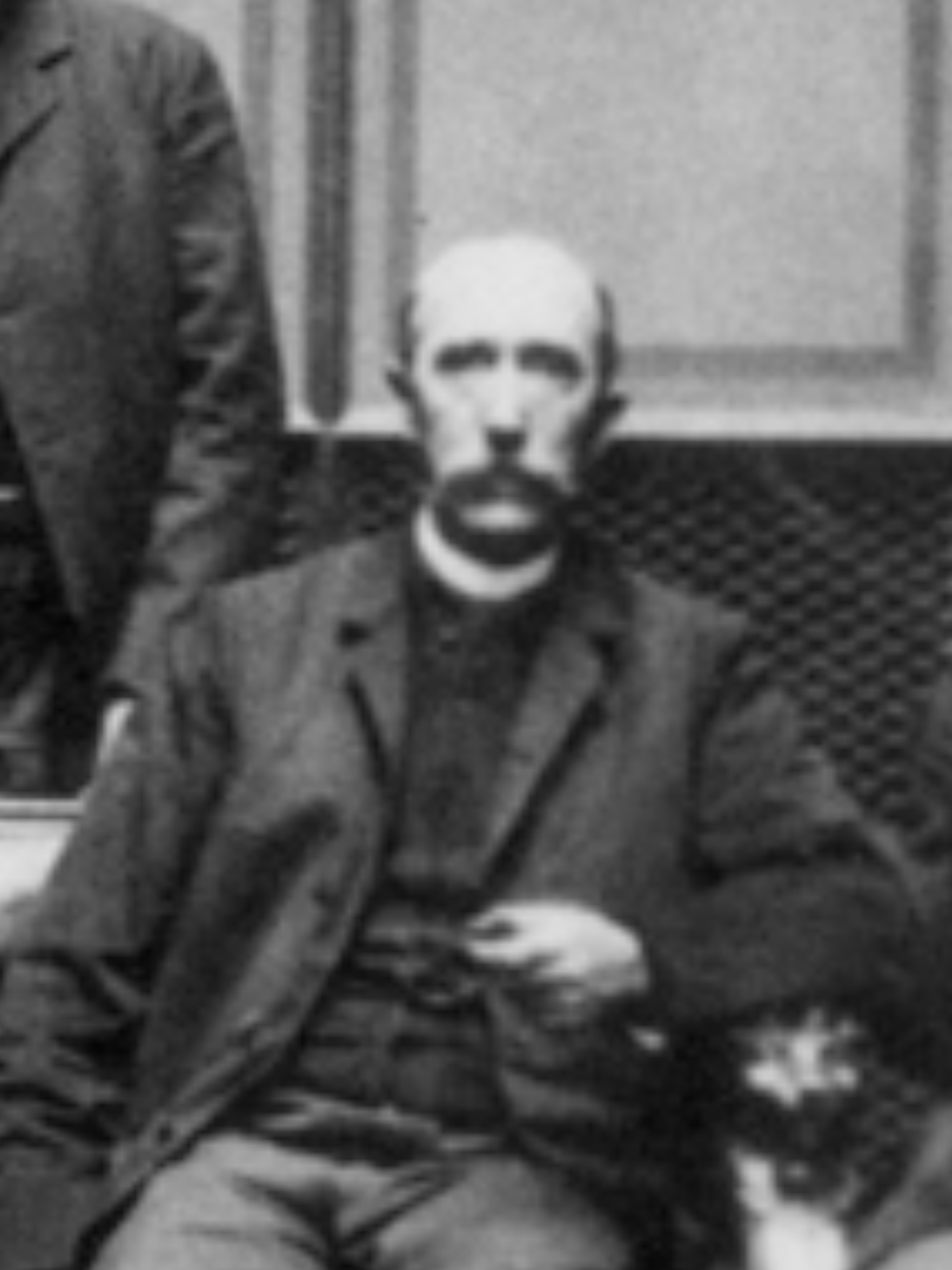

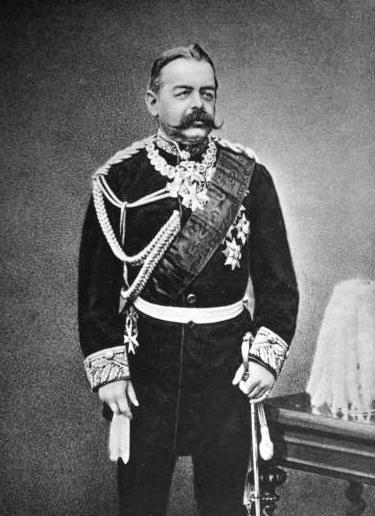
	First party	Second party	Third party
Leader	Rudolf von Bennigsen	Ludwig Windthorst	Otto von Helldorff
Party	NlP	Centre	DKP
Leader since	1867	26 May 1874	7 June 1876
Last election	26.67%, 127 seats	24.83%, 93 seats	9.59%, 40 seats
Seats won	97	94	59
Seat change	▼30	▲1	▲19
Popular vote	1,291,161	1,315,720	736,826
Percentage	22.41%	22.84%	12.79%
Swing	▼4.26 pp	▼1.99 pp	▲3.20 pp
	Fourth party	Fifth party	Sixth party
		DFP	Polen
Leader	Viktor I, Duke of Ratibor
Party	DRP	DFP	Polish Party
Last election	7.85%, 38 seats	7.64%, 34 seats	4.00%, 14 seats
Seats won	57	26	14
Seat change	▲19	▼8	0
Popular vote	785,631	395,065	216,148
Percentage	13.64%	6.86%	3.75%
Swing	▲5.79 pp	▼0.78 pp	▼0.25 pp
- Map of results (by constituencies)
President of the Reichstag before election
Max von Forckenbeck
NlP
President of the Reichstag after election
Max von Forckenbeck
NlP

A federal election for the fourth Reichstag of the German Empire was held on 30 July 1878. It took place 18 months ahead of schedule after two unsuccessful assassination attempts against Emperor Wilhelm I led Chancellor Otto von Bismarck to request an early dissolution of the Reichstag that had been elected in January 1877. Bismarck tried to tie the attacks on the Emperor to the Social Democrats and, indirectly, the National Liberals in order to weaken them and strengthen the conservative parties. Although the National Liberals lost 30 seats and the two main conservative parties gained 38, the National Liberals remained the strongest party in the Reichstag. It went on to pass Bismarck's harsh Anti-Socialist Law in October 1878.

== Historical background ==
The 1878 election, held just 18 months after the previous Reichstag election, is often referred to as the "assassination-attempt election" (Attentatswahl) because it was wholly dominated by the two unsuccessful attempts to assassinate Emperor Wilhelm I in the spring of 1878. Chancellor Otto von Bismarck took immediate political advantage of the public outrage to attack both the leftist Socialist Workers' Party (the forerunner of the Social Democratic Party, or SPD) and the centrist National Liberals. The first attempt on the Emperor's life, on 11 May, was the act of a disturbed individual (Max Hödel) who had had only very loose ties to the SPD, but as soon as Bismarck received word of it, he telegraphed his state secretary in Berlin: "Shouldn't the assassination attempt be taken as an opportunity to immediately start proceedings against socialists and their press?"

On 20 May Bismarck presented a draft "Law on the Defence Against Social Democratic Outrages" (Gesetz zur Abwehr sozialdemokratischer Ausschreitungen), which the Reichstag rejected by a vote of 251 to 57. The law's wording was so broad that the National Liberals feared that it could be directed against them. Bismarck had in fact expected that the party, which in 1876 had blocked a bill he had introduced to extend the range of politically criminal acts, would oppose the measure and that he could then brand them as accomplices of the social democrats.

The second assassination attempt on 2 June was committed by a man named Karl Nobiling who was suffering under "personal delusions". On the following morning, the Wolff semi-official news agency reported that Nobiling had confessed to having SPD sympathies. It was all but impossible that he could have done so, however, because he had been badly wounded during the attack and was not capable of responding to questions. Bismarck nevertheless used the situation to dissolve the Reichstag on 11 June.

Some historians see evidence connecting Bismarck's ministry to Wolff's report and say that it marked the start of the campaign to link Social Democrats to the act and accuse the National Liberals of collusion with them.

== Campaign ==
In the campaign for the new Reichstag, the majority of the National Liberals' candidates came from its conservative wing and had already committed themselves to voting for Bismarck's proposed anti-socialist law. Even some politicians from the left-of-center German Progress Party moved towards the Chancellor. One flyer it put out declared that "the social democratic fraud, along with its parasitic plants, is a disgrace to the entire German people".

The Social Democrats for their part were severely hampered in their ability to campaign. Although no restrictive laws had yet been passed, prominent social democrats had their houses searched and papers confiscated. The party was forced to restrict its campaigning to electoral districts in which it already had a dominant position.

== Electoral system ==
The election was held under general, equal, direct and secret suffrage. All German males over the age of 25 years were able to vote except for active members of the military and recipients of poor relief. The restrictions on the military were meant to keep it from becoming politicized, while men on relief were considered to be open to political manipulation. The constitutional guarantee of a secret vote was not safeguarded at the time, since ballot boxes and polling booths were not introduced until 1903.

If no candidate in a district won an absolute majority of the votes, a runoff election was held between the first- and second-place finishers. It was possible for a replacement candidate to be introduced in a runoff.

== Results ==
As Bismarck had hoped, conservative parties were the clear winners in the election. Both the German Reich Party (also known as the Free Conservative Party) and the German Conservative Party picked up 19 seats. The National Liberals lost 30 seats but with 97 remained the strongest party in the Reichstag. In spite of the attacks against it, the Socialist Workers' Party (Social Democrats) lost just four seats.

Turnout was 63%, only slightly higher than the previous two elections.

Graph of the party split among 397 seats.
Party	Votes	%	+/–	Seats	+/–
Centre Party	1,315,720	22.84	−1.99	94	+1
National Liberal Party	1,291,161	22.41	−4.26	97	−30
German Reich Party	785,631	13.64	+5.79	57	+19
German Conservative Party	736,826	12.79	+3.20	59	+19
Socialist Workers' Party	437,158	7.59	−1.55	9	−4
German Progress Party	395,065	6.86	−0.78	26	−8
Polish Party	216,148	3.75	−0.25	14	0
Alsace-Lorraine parties	178,883	3.11	−0.59	15	0
German-Hanoverian Party	106,555	1.85	+0.27	10	+6
Independent liberals	99,511	1.73	+0.52	7	+2
Löwe-Berger Group	78,152	1.36	−0.37	5	−4
German People's Party	68,851	1.20	+0.37	3	−1
Danish Party	16,145	0.28	−0.04	1	0
Independent conservatives	9,936	0.17	−0.26	0	0
Old Liberals	8,496	0.15	+0.02	0	0
Christian Social Party	3,229	0.06	New	0	New
Schleswig-Holstein Particularist Liberals	2,258	0.04	−0.06	0	0
Others	10,389	0.18	–0.05	0	0
Unknown	833	0.01	0.00	0	0
Total	5,760,947	100.00	–	397	0
Valid votes	5,760,947	99.65			
Invalid/blank votes	20,049	0.35			
Total votes	5,780,996	100.00			
Registered voters/turnout	9,128,305	63.33			
Source: Wahlen in Deutschland

=== Alsace-Lorraine ===
Party	Votes	%	+/–	Seats	+/–
Protesters	70,524	34.52	−11.14	6	−1
Clericals	59,970	29.36	+2.10	5	+2
Autonomists	48,389	23.69	−1.16	4	−1
German Reich Party	24,437	11.96	+11.75	0	0
German Conservative Party	343	0.17	+0.14	0	0
Socialist Workers' Party	141	0.07	New	0	New
Others	478	0.23	−0.37	0	0
Total	204,282	100.00	–	15	0
Valid votes	204,282	98.91			
Invalid/blank votes	2,247	1.09			
Total votes	206,529	100.00			
Registered voters/turnout	322,310	64.08			
Source: Wahlen in Deutschland

== Aftermath ==
On 19 October 1878, Bismarck's Anti-Socialist Law passed the new Reichstag 221 to 149. All National Liberals voted for the law, as did the members of the two conservative parties, while those from the German Progress Party, the Catholic Centre Party – which had been the object of Bismarck's anti-Catholic Kulturkampf – and the Socialist Workers' Party voted against it. The law prohibited societies, meetings, publications, public festivities and processions that "aim[ed] at the overthrow of the existing political or social order through social-democratic, socialist or communist endeavors". It also banned collecting or appealing for contributions to support such activities.

Emperor Wilhelm I signed the law on 21 October 1878. It was subsequently renewed 4 times before it was allowed to expire on 30 September 1890, after Bismarck had resigned as chancellor.
