= Feliks Dekowski =

Member of the Reichstag of the North German Confederation

Member of the Prussian House of Representatives
- In office 1861–1867

Member of the Reichstag of the North German Confederation for Konitz (Marienwerder 6)
- In office 12 February 1867 – 31 August 1867
- Preceded by: Constituency established
- Succeeded by: Stanisław Radkiewicz

Personal details
- Born: Feliks Jan Franciszek Dekowski; 30 January 1827 Grabowo, Kingdom of Prussia
- Died: 8 May 1876 (aged 49) Gdańsk, Kingdom of Prussia, German Empire
- Party: Polish Party

Feliks Jan Franciszek Dekowski (30 January 1827 – 8 May 1876) was a lawyer, a landowner, and a member of the Reichstag of the North German Confederation.

== Biography ==
Dekowski was born in Grabowo, which at the time was part of the Löbau district of the Kingdom of Prussia. While attending a Gymnasium in Kulm (now Chełmno, Poland), he was a member of the Philomaths, a secret organization dedicated to learning Polish history and literature. This membership lead to his arrest in 1846, along with other students. He was released after being questioned.

Having studied law in Berlin from 1849 to 1852, he became an assessor in 1859. Since 1861, he was a district judge in Neustadt (now Wejherowo, Poland). At the time he was also elected as a representative of the Polish Parliamentary Group to the Prussian House of Representatives. He would remain a Landtag member until 1867, when he was elected to the Reichstag of the North German Confederation as the deputy for the district of Tuchel-Conitz.

In 1863 he married Anastazja Warszewska, the owner of Robakowo. The pair had four children: Mieczysław, Kazimierz, Feliks, Wanda and Stanisław.

He was appointed a counselor of the district court in 1871, and settled down in Danzig (now Gdańsk, Poland) a year later. There, he practiced as an attorney and a notary until his death in 1876. He was buried at a cemetery in Danzig.
