= 1877 German federal election =

- 10 January 1877

All 397 seats in the Reichstag 199 seats needed for a majority
- Registered: 8,943,028 ▲4.92%
- Turnout: 5,422,647 (60.64%) ▼0.60pp
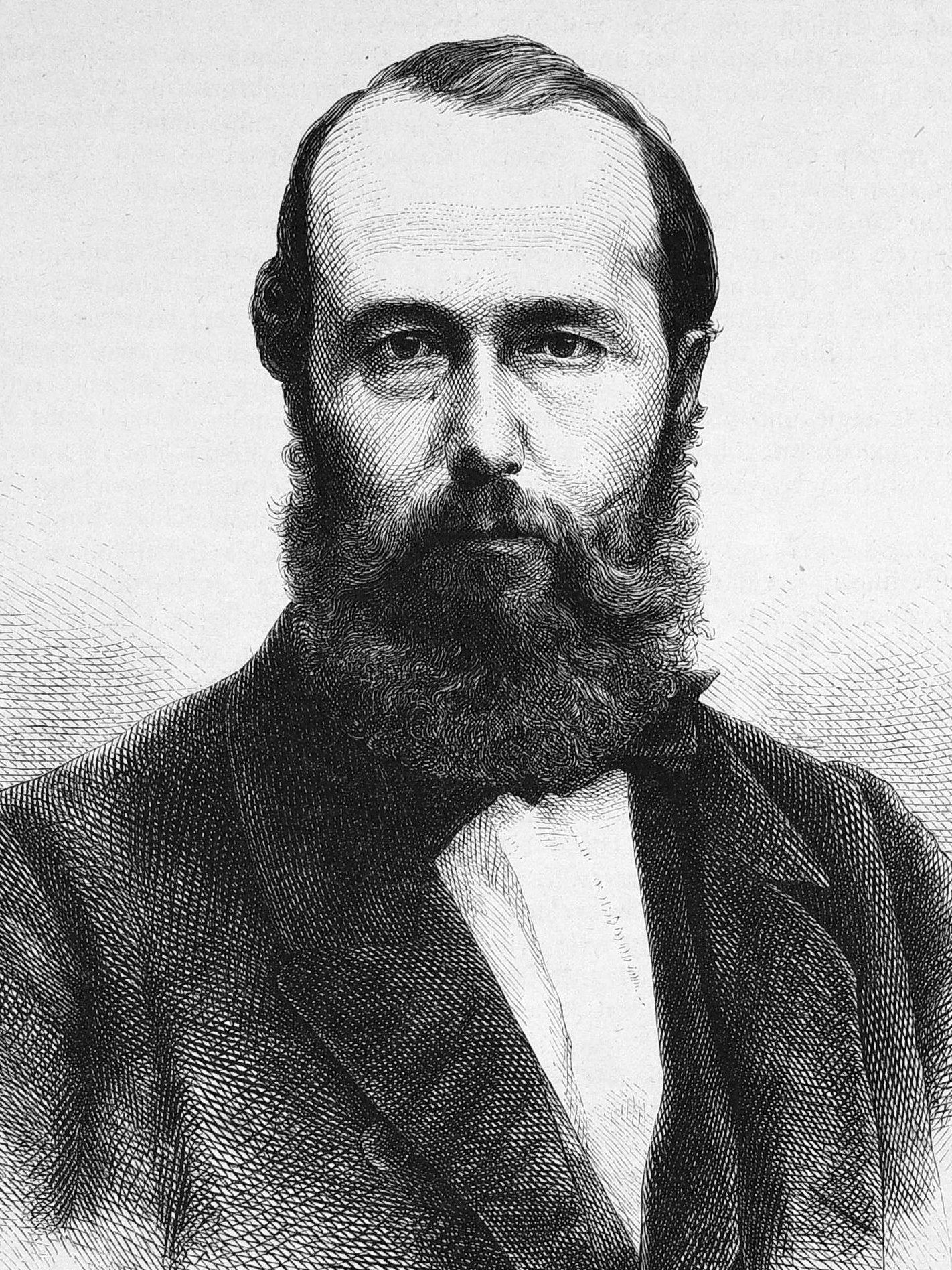

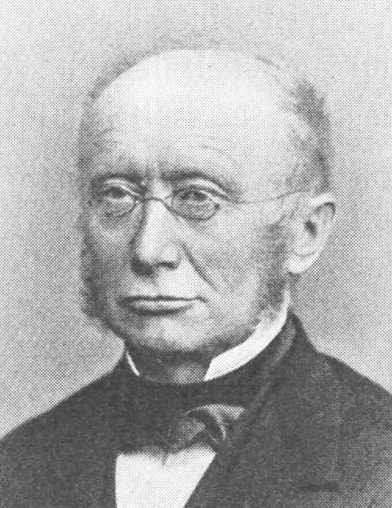

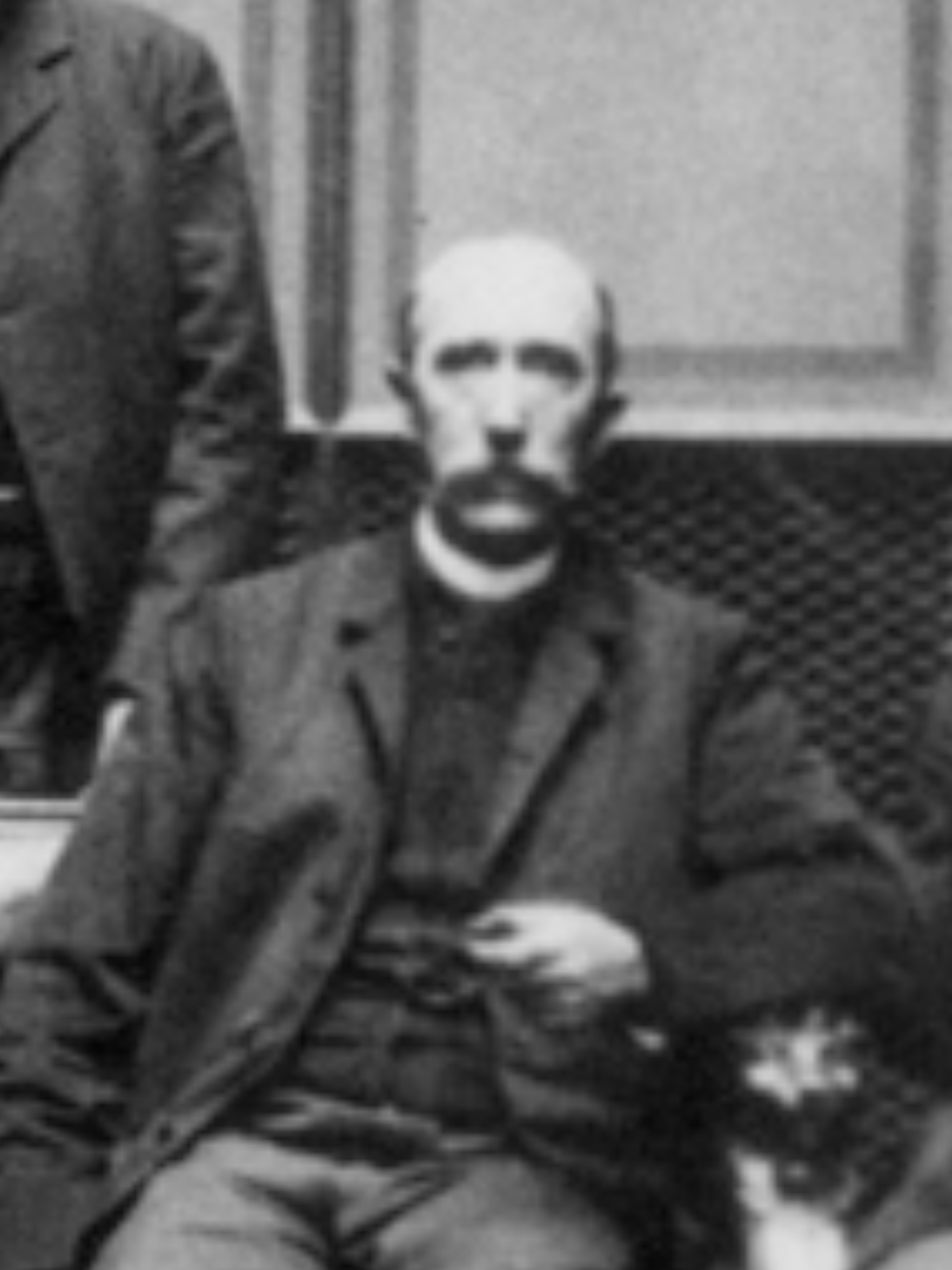

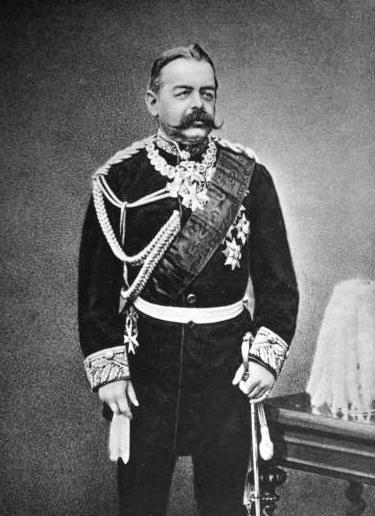
	First party	Second party	Third party
Leader	Rudolf von Bennigsen	Ludwig Windthorst	Otto von Helldorff
Party	NlP	Centre	DKP
Leader since	1867	26 May 1874	7 June 1876
Last election	26.86%, 147 seats	27.72%, 91 seats	6.78%, 21 seats
Seats won	127	93	40
Seat change	▼20	▲2	▲19
Popular vote	1,440,266	1,341,295	517,811
Percentage	26.67%	24.83%	9.59%
Swing	▼0.19 pp	▼2.89 pp	▲2.81 pp
	Fourth party	Fifth party	Sixth party
		DFP	Polen
Leader	Viktor I, Duke of Ratibor
Party	DRP	DFP	Polish Party
Last election	7.49%, 32 seats	8.83%, 48 seats	4.02%, 14 seats
Seats won	38	34	14
Seat change	▲6	▼14	0
Popular vote	424,228	412,769	216,157
Percentage	7.85%	7.64%	4.00%
Swing	▲0.36 pp	▼1.19 pp	▼0.02 pp
- Map of results (by constituencies)
President of the Reichstag before election
Max von Forckenbeck
NlP
President of the Reichstag after election
Max von Forckenbeck
NlP

A federal election for the third Reichstag of the German Empire was held on 10 January 1877. It was a regularly scheduled election based on the three-year legislative period established in the imperial constitution. The voting was strongly influenced by the economic downturn that had followed the Panic of 1873. Conservative, protectionist parties and, to a lesser extent, social democrats gained seats at the expense of liberal and free trade parties, particularly the National Liberals

== Historical background ==
The sharp economic downturn that began in late 1873 significantly affected the 1877 Reichstag election. Known in Germany as the "founders' crash" (Gründerkrach) because it followed the period of rapid growth after the founding of the Empire in 1871, the worldwide Panic of 1873 triggered an economic depression that lasted until 1879 in Germany. Particularly hard hit were workers who lost their jobs and members of the middle class who relied on income from stocks.

The economic problems caused Chancellor Otto von Bismarck to shift away from the free trade policies supported by the National Liberals, who were the largest party in the Reichstag. In an early reaction to his policy changes, Rudolph von Delbrück, head of the Reich Chancellery and a strong proponent of free trade, resigned in 1876. The same year saw the founding of the German Conservative Party, which supported protectionism and endorsed Bismarck's overall policies.

On the political Left, the rival General German Workers' Association (Allgemeiner Deutscher Arbeiterverein, ADAV) and Social Democratic Workers' Party of Germany (Sozialdemokratische Arbeiterpartei Deutschlands, SDAP) merged in 1875 to form the Socialist Workers' Party of Germany (Sozialistische Arbeiterpartei Deutschlands, SAPD). The hardships that the working class faced because of the founders' crash led to a strengthened sense of solidarity among them that was reflected in the SAPD's showing in the 1877 election.

== Electoral system ==
The election was held under general, equal, direct and secret suffrage. All German males over the age of 25 years were able to vote except for active members of the military and recipients of poor relief. The restrictions on the military were meant to keep it from becoming politicized, while men on relief were considered to be open to political manipulation. The constitutional guarantee of a secret vote was not safeguarded at the time, since ballot boxes and polling booths were not introduced until 1903.

If no candidate in a district won an absolute majority of the votes, a runoff election was held between the first- and second-place finishers. It was possible for a replacement candidate to be introduced in a runoff.

== Results ==
The election overall was favorable to Bismarck. The German Conservative Party gained 19 seats, the liberal-conservative German Reich Party 6 and the Socialist Workers' Party 3. In spite of losing 20 seats, the National Liberals remained the largest party in the Reichstag. The other major loser was the liberal German Progress Party, down 14 seats. The new Löwe-Berger Group, which had split from them in 1874, won 9 seats. Turnout was just under 61%.

Graph of the party split among 397 seats.
Party	Votes	%	+/–	Seats	+/–
National Liberal Party	1,440,266	26.67	−0.19	127	−20
Centre Party	1,341,295	24.83	−2.89	93	+2
German Conservative Party	517,811	9.59	+2.81	40	+19
Socialist Workers' Party	493,447	9.14	+2.38	13	+3
German Reich Party	424,228	7.85	+0.36	38	+6
German Progress Party	412,769	7.64	−1.19	34	−14
Polish Party	216,157	4.00	−0.02	14	0
Alsace-Lorraine Parties	199,976	3.70	−0.82	15	0
Löwe-Berger Group (Note: Split from the German Progress Party in 1874.)	93,471	1.73	New	9	New
German-Hanoverian Party	85,591	1.58	+0.17	4	0
Independent liberals	65,266	1.21	−0.14	5	+1
German People's Party	44,894	0.83	+0.08	4	+3
Independent conservatives	23,187	0.43	+0.01	0	−1
Danish Party	17,277	0.32	−0.06	1	0
Old Liberals	7,080	0.13	−0.04	0	0
Schleswig-Holstein Particularist Liberals	5,614	0.10	−0.17	0	0
Others	12,324	0.23	−0.13	0	0
Unknown	368	0.01	+0.01	0	0
Total	5,401,021	100.00	–	397	0
Valid votes	5,401,021	99.60			
Invalid/blank votes	21,626	0.40			
Total votes	5,422,647	100.00			
Registered voters/turnout	8,943,028	60.64			
Source: Wahlen in Deutschland

=== Alsace-Lorraine ===
Party	Votes	%	+/–	Seats	+/–
Protesters	93,395	45.66	+11.34	7	+1
Clericals	55,752	27.26	−16.59	3	−6
Autonomists	50,829	24.85	+6.12	5	+5
German Progress Party	2,891	1.41	+1.41	0	0
German Reich Party	435	0.21	+0.21	0	0
Others	1,234	0.60		0	0
Total	204,536	100.00	–	15	0
Valid votes	204,536	98.74			
Invalid/blank votes	2,614	1.26			
Total votes	207,150	100.00			
Registered voters/turnout	322,871	64.16			
Source: Wahlen in Deutschland

== Aftermath ==
After two assassination attempts against Emperor Wilhelm I in May and June 1878 and disputes over the planned Anti-Socialist Law that Bismarck introduced as a result, the third Reichstag was dissolved by the Emperor at Bismarck's request, and a new election was held on 30 July 1878.
