= Danish Party =

German political party (1871–1919)

Danish Party Dänische Partei
- Founded: 1871
- Dissolved: 1919
- Ideology: Danish minority interests

The Danish Party (German: Dänische Partei) was a political party in the German Empire.

== History ==
The party was established in 1871 to represent the 50,000-strong Danish population of North Schleswig, who remained opposed to their separation from Denmark following the Second Schleswig War in 1864. It won a seat in every Reichstag elected between 1871 and 1912. Its best performance was in the 1881 elections, the only occasion on which it won two seats.

The party disappeared after World War I, following the Schleswig Plebiscites and the return of Northern Schleswig to Denmark.

== Election results ==
Election	Votes	%	Seats	+/–
February 1867	27,493	0.74	2 / 297	–
August 1867	25,398	1.11	1 / 297	▼1
1871	21,143	0.54	1 / 382	Steady
1874	15,439	0.20	1 / 397	Steady
1877	14,398	0.28	2 / 397	▲1
1878	14,447	0.26	1 / 397	▼1
1881	14,843	0.16	1 / 397	Steady
1884	14,447	0.26	1 / 397	Steady
1887	12,360	0.16	1 / 397	Steady
1890	13,672	0.19	1 / 397	Steady
1893	14,843	0.16	1 / 397	Steady
1898	15,439	0.20	1 / 397	Steady
1903	14,843	0.16	1 / 397	Steady
1907	14,843	0.16	1 / 397	Steady
1912	17,289	0.14	1 / 397	Steady

== See also ==
South Schleswig Voters' Association
