= German-Hanoverian Party =

German-Hanoverian Party Deutsch-Hannoversche Partei
- Founded: 1867
- Dissolved: 1933
- Succeeded by: Lower Saxony State Party
- Newspaper: Hannoversche Landeszeitung
- Ideology: Agrarianism; Federalism; Hanoverian regionalism Hanoverian independence Christian democracy
- Political position: Centre-left (Note: The party moved sharply to the left in 1920s, abandoning Guelph legitimism in favour of republicanism, establishing cooperation with Social Democrats and socialists, and denouncing right-wing parties such as the DNVP and the Stahlhelm.); Historical (pre-WWI): Centre-right

The German-Hanoverian Party (German: Deutsch-Hannoversche Partei, DHP), also known as the Guelph Party (German: Welfenpartei), was an agrarian, federalist political party in the Kingdom of Prussia. It sought to restore the Kingdom of Hanover under the House of Welf, which had been turned into a mere province of the Kingdom of Prussia in the aftermath of the Austro-Prussian War in 1866. It represented the interests of Hanoverian separatists and regionalists that sought to restore the overthrown House of Welf and separate from Prussia to either become a kingdom within Germany or to become independent outright. The party was a part of the anti-Prussian faction in the Reichstag and closely cooperated with the Catholic Centre Party, including opposing Kulturkampf and centralization legislations.

German political commentators mockingly considered the party the Protestant wing of the Centre Party, given their similar political programs and anti-Prussian agenda. E. Bukey remarked that "the DHP behaved as if it were an integral part of the Zentrum" and "had most Guelphs not been Protestants the DHP might have disappeared altogether." The party also cooperated with the SPD and both parties together voted against the anti-socialist laws and opposed military and colonial expansion; because the "SPD-DHP cooperation was a major factor in maintaining DHP strength in the province of Hanover", DHP was able to maintain its strong position in the German Empire. The party tried to separate Hanover from Germany in 1920, in a coup attempt that became known as the Welfenputsch. The party declined after the failure of the 1924 Hanoverian secession referendum and moved to the left, abandoning monarchism in favour of republicanism and denouncing right-wing parties and movements. It disbanded in 1933 in response to the rise of the NSDAP.

== History ==
The party was founded in 1867 in protest to the annexation of the Kingdom of Hanover by the Kingdom of Prussia in the aftermath of the Austro-Prussian War. They wanted the revival of the Kingdom of Hanover and the restoration of the sequestrated assets of the former ruling House of Welf. The party therefore was also called the Welfen, and drew its strongest support from the rural areas around Hannover.

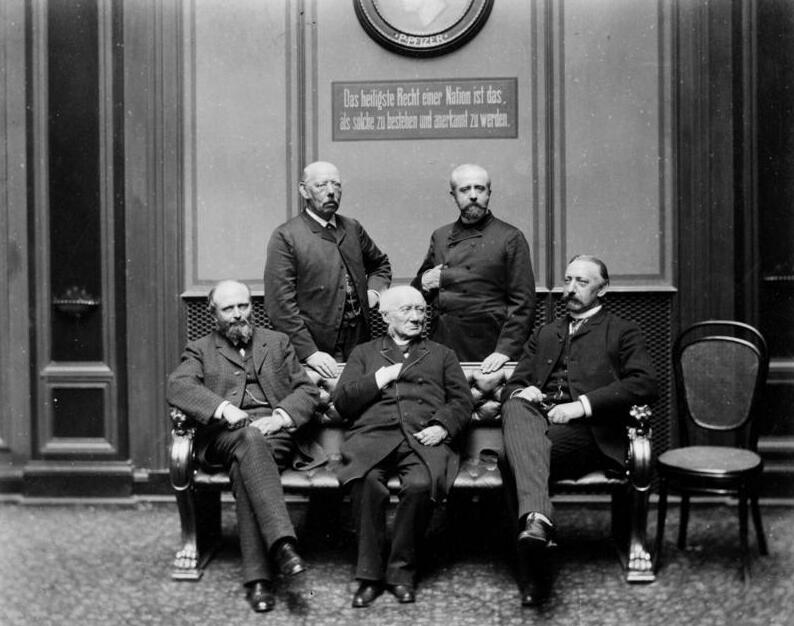
German-Hanoverian parliamentary group, 1889. First line, sitting: Heinrich Langwerth von Simmern, Ludwig Windthorst (centre), Werner von Arnswaldt-Hardenbostel, second line: - standing: Hermann von Arnswaldt-Böhme, Georg von der Decken

In the Reichstag, DHP deputies usually acted as allies of the anti-Prussian Centre Party parliamentary group under Ludwig Windthorst, who although a Catholic and leader of the Centre Party was a former Hanoverian Justice Minister who was loyal to the House of Welf. From 1890 the party was led by Georg von der Decken.

After the proclamation of the German Empire, the imperial authorities had failed to produce an integrated society, despite the rapid industrialization that took place during the Wilhelmine era. Occupational, religious and regional identities prevailed over a unitary German one, and "bonds of unity that did exist were provided by the artificial dominance of Prussia". As such, the DHP appealed to the regional pride of the voters, and demonstrated a lack of integration of Hannover into Prussia and thus Germany, as the Hanoverian population felt alienated from Berlin. The main voter base of the German-Hanoverian party was former nobility, small business owners, public officials and Lutherans; many groups of the Hanoverian society lost privileges upon their annexation to Prussia, and the local industry suffered as local business was forced to compete with Prussian Junkers as well. As such, many resented the loss of Hanoverian independence. The party also found support among other groups, such as Roman Catholics, who were persecuted by the now-dominating Prussian authorities during the Kulturkampf. The Catholic population was deeply opposed to the unification of Germany and feared further persecution and identity loss in a Prussia- and Protestant-dominated Germany. The party also enjoyed support of Hanoverian craftsmen and artisans, whose guilds and unions were undermined by the annexation, and of industrial workers, who had to deal with worse conditions as the local industry suffered.

The party won 45.2% of Hanoverian vote in the February 1867 North German federal election, and won 9 seats in the Reichstag. The DHP performed especially well in rural areas, while also dominating the city of Hanover thanks to the support of the industrial working class. Lastly, the party also performed well in Roman Catholic areas, such as the Duchy of Meppen-Lingen. In 1870, the regionalist supporters met in the city of Einbeck, where a Hannoverscher Wahlverein, responsible for picking election candidates was proclaimed. The party mainly focused on cultivating its strength in rural areas, advocating protectionist measures to shield Hanoverian agriculture and combat competition from Prussian landowners. The party appealed to the regionalist sentiment by reminding voters of the "good times" before 1866, such as lower taxes under independent Hanover. One of the main element of the DHP's campaign was its newspaper Deutsche Volkszeitung, which maintained a small circulation of 6000 copies sold daily. The party was also supported by unrelated regionalist newspapers, such as the Deutsch-Hannoverscher Volkskalender. Throughout the 19th century, the German-Hanoverian Party remained strictly separatist and campaigned mainly on local issues, while only commenting on national developments from a parochial Hanoverian perspective.

The DHP was closely associated with Ludwig Windthorst, who used to be a minister in independent Hanover. Despite supporting and campaigning for the DHP, Windthorst never joined the party, and focused on building an all-Catholic coalition, becoming a co-founder of the Catholic Centre Party in the process. Once the Centre Party entered politics, the DHP cooperated with it; both parties were opposed to statism and Prussian taxation, while also seeking a more decentralised German union and the preservation of confessional schools. As such, the German-Hanoverian Party condemned the Kulturkampf and spoke in favour of Roman Catholic interests. As part of its cooperation with the SPD, the DHP also opposed the Anti-Socialist Laws, as many of the party members "felt a genuine obligation to protect the working class and thus found it expedient to cooperate with the SPD". The party deputies also opposed and criticised the colonial policies of Germany, voting against army expansions and condemning colonial expansion as the cause of diplomatic tensions with other colonial empires.

The party suffered a severe decline in the early 20th century, as its "clerical-proletarian-agrarian coalition" began to break down. Industrial workers started flocking to the SDP as industrialisation progressed, while many landed proprietors and small businesses switched to the German Agrarian League. Lastly, the party also lost the support of local Roman Catholics as it severed its ties to the Centre Party in 1912. The main reason for the decline, however, was the transformation of Hanover from a rural nation into a heavily industrialised one, which eroded the party's overwhelmingly rural base.

During the German Revolution of 1918–1919, the DHP advocated the implementation of a Free State of Hanover within the Weimar Republic, and launched a secondary coup during the Kapp Putsch in March 1920 with the aim of occupying government buildings in Hanover and declaring independence. While the coup ended in failure, it shocked public opinion, showing that even the DHP, which was regarded as "moderate separatist" party, was willing to risk violence and civil war under circumstances. Liberal and republican politicians also pointed out that "the authorities tasked with upholding the republican constitution were often anything but committed republicans", and were often trivializing and tolerating violence and coup threats from the right. The readiness of Guelph militias to battle the conservative Reichswehr caused an outpour of sympathy from the left—Hannover's Communists defended the DHP against accusations of treason by Social Democrats. It was also reported that Iwan Katz, the leading spokesman for the German far-left, was ready to assist the Guelphs during the coup if it had more success.

The DHP turned to more electoral means afterwards, and its pro-independence petition secured 600,000 signatures. The party also argued that Hanover contributed more in taxes to the welfare of Prussia and Germany than it received in return, expanding its appeal beyond the Guelph loyalty. This allowed it to win significant support in the District of Stade in 1918, which was previously the stronghold of the National Liberals. The party then succeeded in having a plebiscite held in the Prussian Province of Hanover on 19 May 1924.

The referendum was endorsed by the Bavarian minister of the interior, Franz Xaver Schweyer, who wished the 'Lower Saxon tribe's endeavours to gain independence every success'. Schweyer was attacked by the Social Democrats, who remarked that a Northern politician meddling or merely commenting on Bavarian politics would have sparked outrage. Schweyer then responded that "Prussia must blame herself for the rising number of people who have a desire and think it an urgent requirement for the sake of the Reich to end Prussia's abuse of her numerical superiority, which ruthlessly suppresses the legitimate concerns of other states." Members of the DHP feared that the referendum could be interpreted as a "right-wing ploy directed against the socialist government of Prussia", which sparked the Guelphs to try and win support for independence from the left. However, the referendum fell short of the one-third threshold required to enact devolution, with 25.5 per cent in favour. According to Evan Bukey, the result nevertheless showed that many Hanoverians remained alienated from Germany, and "continued to maintain their regional loyalty and to feel uncomfortable in the German state".

1932 election poster of the party

The defeat at the referendum hastened the party's decline. The party turned sharply to the left in late 1920s and 1930s, rejecting right-wing parties and organizations such as the German National People's Party and the Stahlhelm as "too authoritarian and set on establishing a fascist dictatorship". The DHP also pledged its loyalty to the constitution, stating that "as a party of justice and out of a sense of responsibility it prefers not to pursue a politics of collapse and ruin and rather to remain true to the constitution". In the early 1930s, the party marked its largest break by embracing republicanism—however, the party had become largely irrelevant by then, "overwhelmed by forces more ruthless and radical in their demands for comprehensive change". In 1933, the DHP, like other conservative and liberal parties, dissolved to prevent a ban by the Nazi regime.

=== Members in Reichstag during Weimar Republic before 1933 ===
- Ludwig Alpers (1866–1959)
- Hermann Colshorn (1853–1931)
- Heinrich Langwost (1874–1944)
- Carl Sievers (1867–1925)
- August Hampe (1866–1945)
- Heinrich Meyer (1878–1948)
- Friedrich Wilhelm Nolte (1880–1952)
- August Arteldt (1870–1948)
- Adolf Freiherr von Hammerstein-Loxten (1868–1939)

After World War II, a party called Niedersächsische Landespartei ("Lower Saxon State Party") was formed as a continuation of the DHP. From 1947 that party was known as the German Party (DP). By the time of 1953, a group of DP dissidents formed a new DHP, which again joined the remnants of the German Party in 1962.

== Electoral results ==
Election	Votes	%	Seats	+/–
February 1867	111,781	2.99	9 / 297	–
August 1867	28,581	1.24	4 / 297	▼5
1871	73,470	1.89	7 / 382	▲3
1874	73,436	1.41	4 / 397	▼3
1877	85,591	1.58	4 / 397	–
1878	106,555	1.85	10 / 397	▲6
1881	86,704	1.70	10 / 397	–
1884	96,388	1.70	11 / 397	▲1
1887	119,441	1.58	4 / 397	▼7
1890	112,675	1.56	11 / 397	▲7
1893	101,810	1.33	7 / 397	▼4
1898	105,161	1.36	9 / 397	▲2
1903	100,538	1.06	7 / 397	▼2
1907	92,811	0.82	2 / 397	▼5
1912	90,168	0.74	5 / 397	▲3
1919	77,226	0.25	1 / 423	▼4
1920	319,108	1.13	5 / 459	▲4
May 1924	319,792	1.09	5 / 472	–
December 1924	261,549	0.86	4 / 493	▼1
1928	195,555	0.64	4 / 491	–
1930	144,286	0.41	3 / 577	▼1
July 1932	46,927	0.13	0 / 608	▼3
November 1932	63,966	0.18	1 / 584	▲1
March 1933	47,743	0.12	0 / 647	▼1

== See also ==
- Guelphic Legion

== Bibliography ==
- Hans Prilop: Die Vorabstimmung 1924 in Hannover. Untersuchungen zur Vorgeschichte und Geschichte der Deutsch-Hannoverschen Partei im deutschen Kaiserreich und in der Weimarer Republik. phil. Diss., Hamburg: Universität, 1954.
