= Stanisław Motty =

Polish parliamentarian in the German Empire

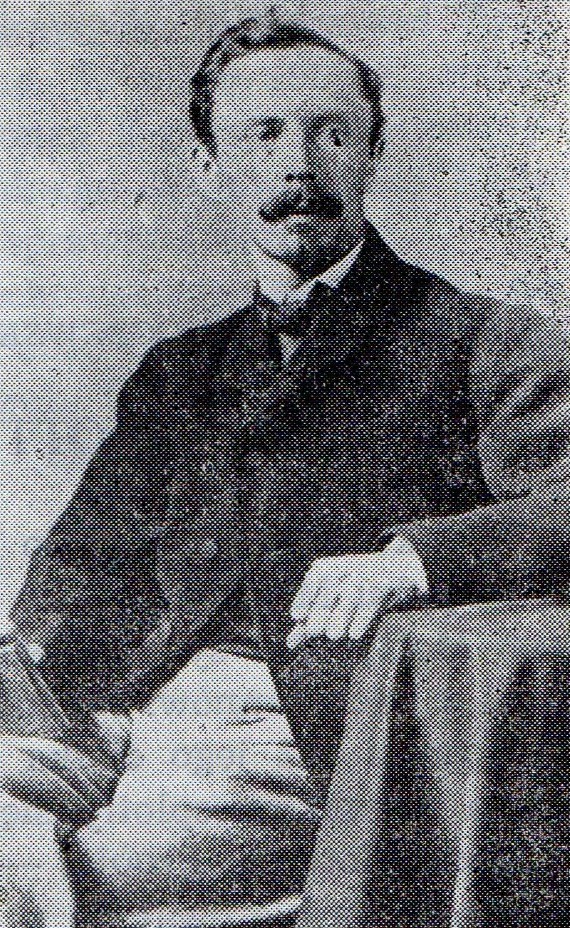

Member of the Prussian House of Representatives
- In office 1863–1867; 1885–1900

Member of the Reichstag of the North German Confederation for Poznań (Posen 1)
- In office 12 February 1867 – 31 August 1867
- Preceded by: Constituency established
- Succeeded by: Richard Krieger

Member of the Reichstag of the German Empire for Poznań (Posen 1)
- In office 16 June 1898 – 21 December 1900
- Preceded by: Stefan Cegielski
- Succeeded by: Bernard Chrzanowski

Personal details
- Born: Łukasz Augustyn Stanisław Motty; 18 October 1826 Poznań, Kingdom of Prussia
- Died: 21 December 1900 (aged 74) Poznań, Kingdom of Prussia, German Empire
- Party: Polish Party

Łukasz Augustyn Stanisław Motty (18 October 1826 – 21 December 1900) was a Polish social activist, lawyer, and Reichstag member.

== Biography ==
Born in Poznań in 1826 to Apolonia Herwig and Jean-Baptiste Motty. Having attended the Friedrich Wilhelm Gymnasium in Poznań, he studied law in Berlin and Heidelberg from 1845 to 1849. He participated in the Greater Poland Uprising of 1848, during which he focused moreso on educating the masses (organic work) rather than military action. This involvement lead to his arrest, but he was released in the same year, free to resume his studies.

Once he finished his studies, he became a judge for the district court of Poznań in 1849, eventually getting appointed as its councilor, a position he would hold until 1899. He co-founded Poznań Society of Friends of Learning in 1857 and was involved in the 1863 January Uprising as a member of Polish National Government. A pioneer of credit unions, he helped found the Union of Polish Companies in 1871.

== Political career ==
From 1863 until 1867 he was, as part of the Polish Parliamentary Group, a member of the Prussian House of Representatives, which he left when he was elected to the Reichstag of the North German Confederation for the district of the city of Poznań. He would return to the House of Representatives in 1885, and remain a deputy until his death in 1900.

He assumed leadership of the Polish Party in 1894 and, four years later, as a result of the 1898 German federal election, he once again became the representative of the city of Poznań, now in the Reichstag of the German Empire. He served on the budgetary committee, committee on the shipping lines to East Africa, and the committee on patent attorneys. He died during his term, and was succeeded by Bernard Chrzanowski after a by-election.

His parliamentary career was dedicated to advocating for the rights of Poles in Prussia. He stood up for those incarcerated after the January Uprising, and opposed the Germanisation of Poles, especially the actions of the Prussian Settlement Commission. A steadfast conservative, he heavily criticized Józef Kościelski for his conciliatory approach towards the imperial government, and he did not change his stance even after the dismissal of Otto von Bismarck. He, along with other deputies from the Polish Parliamentary Group, objected to the accession of the Grand Duchy of Posen to the North German Confederation. In 1895, he condemned the actions of the German Eastern Marches Society.

== Family ==
He was the youngest son of Jean-Baptiste Motty, a polonized French naturalist, and Apolonia Herwig. His older brother Marceli (1818–1898) was a social activist and a writer. His sister Walentyna (1823–1859) was married to Hipolit Cegielski.

He has married twice. His second marriage, with Michalina Danysz (1849–1926) produced three children. His daughter Paulina (1871–1970) married her cousin, Stefan Cegielski, Hipolit Cegielski's son.
