= Free Conservative Party =

Moderate German party (1866–1918)

Free Conservative Party Freikonservative Partei
- Founders: Carl Ferdinand von Stumm-Halberg; Wilhelm von Kardorff
- Founded: 28 July 1866
- Dissolved: 13 December 1918
- Split from: Prussian Conservative Party
- Succeeded by: DNVP (right-wing factions); DVP (moderate factions)
- Headquarters: Berlin, Prussia
- Newspaper: Die Post
- Ideology: Liberal conservatism Political Protestantism; East Elbia regionalism German nationalism
- Political position: Centre to centre-right
- Colors: Sky blue

The Free Conservative Party (German: Freikonservative Partei, FKP) was a liberal-conservative political party in Prussia and the German Empire which ran as the German Reich Party (German: Deutsche Reichspartei, DRP) in the federal elections to the Reichstag beginning in 1871.

The party was formed when it split from the Prussian Conservative Party in 1866. It was a minimally organized "party of notables" whose members came largely from the wealthier upper classes. Politically, the Free Conservatives stood between the German Conservative Party and the National Liberal Party. During the chancellorship of Otto von Bismarck, it generally gave him its strong support, and many of its members were ministers and diplomats. After Wilhelm II became emperor in 1888, the party lost a significant portion of its earlier strength. It took a staunchly nationalist stance during World War I and disbanded in 1918 during the early weeks of the German revolution. The majority of its members then joined the right-wing German National People's Party.

== History ==
=== Founding and organisation ===
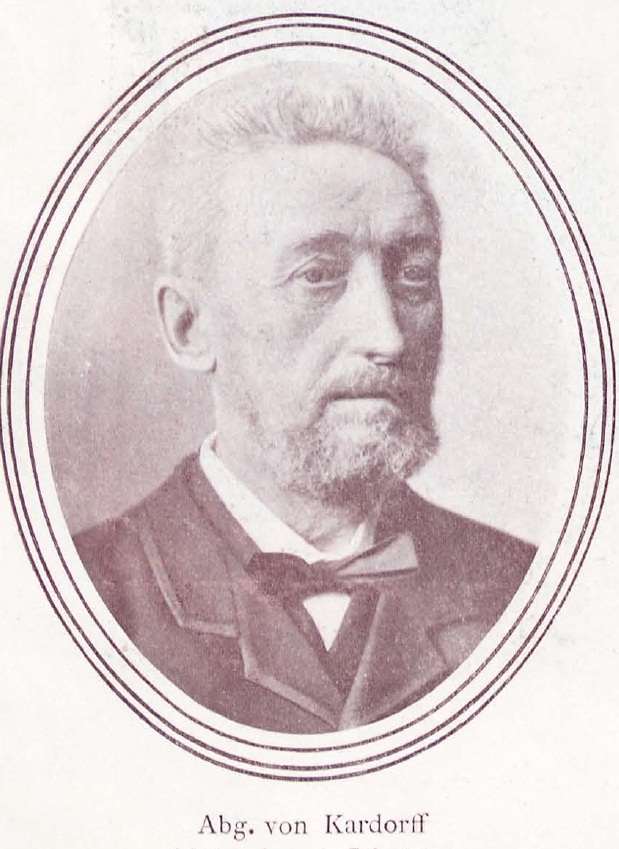
Wilhelm von Kardorff, one of the founders of the Free Conservative Party

The Free Conservative Party split from the Prussian Conservative Party in 1866 as a result of disagreements over Chancellor Otto von Bismarck's policies in the wake of the Austro-Prussian War. Unlike the original party, the Free Conservatives supported the territorial annexations that led to the founding of the North German Confederation under Prussia's leadership. They also favoured the advancement of commerce and industry and trusted that Bismarck would incorporate elements of modernity into Prussia's tradition of authoritarian rule. On 28 July 1866, along with some members of the Old Liberals, they formed the Free Conservative Association, which within the year renamed itself the Free Conservative Party. After the founding of the German Empire in 1871, the party ran in the Reichstag elections as the German Reich Party (Deutsche Reichspartei).

The party was poorly organised internally and consisted of little more than the party contingents in the Reichstag and the Prussian Landtag. To establish a connection between the two, a national committee was formed in 1870, but it was not particularly active. Its office in Berlin was staffed by only one person. Before 1890 there was no official party leader, and the first party conference did not take place until 1906. Beginning in 1907, the official party structure consisted of an electoral association which was led by an executive board and committee. In the party's later phase, regional associations were established as well.

The party newspaper was Die Post, which switched allegiance to the anti-government Pan-German camp in 1910.

=== Party manifesto ===
The Free Conservatives had no fixed party program until 1906; before then its founding manifesto, presented on 27 October 1867, served in place of one. The manifesto expressed only high-level political tenets. It saw the North German Confederation as an "extension of the Prussian monarchy" and praised its accomplishments as an absolute monarchical power, but then went on to say that absolutism's time had ended. The Confederation's people needed to have a part in determining their own destiny, and "the monarchy itself requires the cooperation of the people in order to fulfil its lofty mission". The party believed in a constitution but opposed the separation of powers:

We honour the state constitution as a source of strength for the monarchy, as an unfolding of popular customs and traditions, as the guarantor of the freedom of the church, of the equality of confessions, of the separation of political rights from religious faith. We also fight the antiquated doctrine of separation of powers; we counter that notion confidently with the principle of the communal exercise of unified state authority.

The manifesto stated that the party would support both federal and state governments when their policies placed the national interest first but would, "with true loyalty to king and Fatherland", uphold free conservative principles when a government's policies parted from them.

=== Membership ===
The Free Conservative Party was a "party of notables" (Honoratiorenpartei), a party whose members came largely from the wealthy upper class and Bildungsbürgertum (educated middle class) and were able to participate in politics because of their financial independence. Many were high-ranking civil servants, military men, university professors and representatives of trade and industry. Because its members filled a large number of posts as ministers and state undersecretaries, it was sometimes referred to as the party of "ministers and diplomats". Rather than exercising policy influence through a party apparatus, it did so through personal contacts, including many at the imperial court. In the 1867 Reichstag it was represented by three princes, two dukes, nine counts and eleven barons. Its leading members were the landowner Wilhelm von Kardorff and mining industrialist Carl Ferdinand von Stumm. Geographically it had particular strengths in Silesia and Prussia's Rhine Province. The party had close ties to the nationalist Pan-German League (founded in 1891) and the German Agrarian League (1893).

=== Policies ===
Politically, the Free Conservatives stood between the National Liberals and the German Conservative Party. As a decidedly pro-government party, they supported Bismarck's anti-Catholic Kulturkampf and, as the party of the elites, his Anti-Socialist Laws. In 1878 it was the driving force behind the shift towards a protective tariff policy. With support from some members of the German Conservative Party, the Free Conservatives opposed Bismarck when he ended the Kulturkampf and began to introduce social reforms such as health insurance for workers. They wanted to see the Anti-Socialist Laws strengthened and advocated a stronger military and more colonisation. From 1887 to 1890 (the final years of Bismarck's chancellorship), it was one of the cartel parties – an electoral alliance of the Free Conservatives, the German Conservative Party and the National Liberals – which Bismarck saw as his only reliable source of support. With the cartel in the majority following the 1887 Reichstag election, it was able to push through the second seven-year military budget (septennate) that Bismarck wanted.

At the beginning of the Wilhelmine era (1890–1918), the party lost 22 seats in the 1890 Reichstag election, dropping from 41 to 19. It never recovered its former strength; the greatest number of seats it was able to achieve afterwards was 28 in the 1893 election. The party continued to oppose moves towards a parliamentary system but was open to changes in the Prussian three-class franchise, which weighted votes by the amount of taxes paid, as long as they did not lead to an equal, universal manhood voting system such as was used in elections to the national Reichstag.

During the First World War, the party advocated annexationist war aims, opposed the Reichstag's 1917 peace resolution and supported the militaristic German Fatherland Party after it was founded in 1917. On 13 December 1918, during the early weeks of the German revolution, the executive board of the Free Conservatives advised party members to join the right-wing German National People's Party (DNVP), effectively disbanding the 52-year-old party.

== Election results ==
Reichstag
| Date | Votes | | | Seats | | Rank |
| Date | No. | % | ± pct | No. | ± | Rank |
|---|---|---|---|---|---|---|
| February 1867 | 348,537 | 9.33 | New | 39 / 297 | New | 4th |
| August 1867 | 205,792 | 8.95 | ▼0.38 | 36 / 297 | ▼3 | ▲4th |
| 1871 | 343,098 | 8.83 | ▼0.12 | 37 / 382 | ▲1 | ▼5th |
| 1874 | 388,840 | 7.49 | ▼1.34 | 32 / 397 | ▼5 | ▲4th |
| 1877 | 424,228 | 7.85 | ▲0.36 | 38 / 397 | ▲6 | ▼5th |
| 1878 | 785,631 | 13.64 | ▲5.79 | 57 / 397 | ▲19 | ▲3rd |
| 1881 | 382,149 | 7.50 | ▼6.14 | 27 / 397 | ▼30 | ▼6th |
| 1884 | 387,637 | 6.85 | ▼0.65 | 28 / 397 | ▲1 | 6th |
| 1887 | 736,389 | 9.77 | ▲2.92 | 41 / 397 | ▲13 | 6th |
| 1890 | 461,307 | 6.38 | ▼3.39 | 19 / 397 | ▼22 | 6th |
| 1893 | 437,972 | 5.71 | ▼0.67 | 28 / 397 | ▲9 | 6th |
| 1898 | 337,601 | 4.35 | ▼1.36 | 22 / 397 | ▼6 | 6th |
| 1903 | 336,617 | 3.54 | ▼0.81 | 21 / 397 | ▼1 | 6th |
| 1907 | 471,863 | 4.19 | ▲0.65 | 24 / 397 | ▲3 | 6th |
| 1912 | 396,948 | 3.25 | ▼0.94 | 14 / 397 | ▼10 | 6th |

== Notable members ==
- Hans Hartwig von Beseler, general
- Johann Viktor Bredt, expert in constitutional law
- Hermann von Dechend, financial expert
- Hans Delbrück, historian
- Karl Rudolf Friedenthal, businessman and solicitor
- Hermann von Hatzfeldt, civil servant and general
- Hugo zu Hohenlohe-Öhringen, politician, mining industrialist and general
- Wilhelm von Kardorff, politician and agricultural estate owner
- Karl Max, Prince Lichnowsky, diplomat
- Eduard von Liebert, military officer, colonial administrator and statesman
- Viktor I, Duke of Ratibor, politician
- Carl Ferdinand von Stumm-Halberg, politician and mining industrialist

== See also ==
- Agrarian conservatism in Germany
- Conservatism in Germany
- Liberal conservatism
- Progressive conservatism
