= Grabowo, Iława County =

Grabowo
- Village
- Location within Poland
- Coordinates: 53°33′42″N 19°49′7″E
- Country: Poland
- Voivodeship: Warmian-Masurian
- County: Iława
- Gmina: Lubawa
- Population: 670

Grabowo [ɡraˈbɔvɔ] is a village in the administrative district of Gmina Lubawa, within Iława County, Warmian-Masurian Voivodeship, in northern Poland.
