= Zieliniec, Greater Poland Voivodeship =

Zieliniec
- Village
- Location within Poland
- Coordinates: 52°15′N 17°39′E
- Country: Poland
- Voivodeship: Greater Poland
- County: Września
- Gmina: Kołaczkowo
- Elevation: 100 m (330 ft)
- Population: 490

Zieliniec [ʑɛˈliɲɛt͡s] is a village in the administrative district of Gmina Kołaczkowo, within Września County, Greater Poland Voivodeship, in west-central Poland.
