= August 1867 North German federal election =

- 31 August 1867

All 297 seats in the Reichstag 149 seats needed for a majority
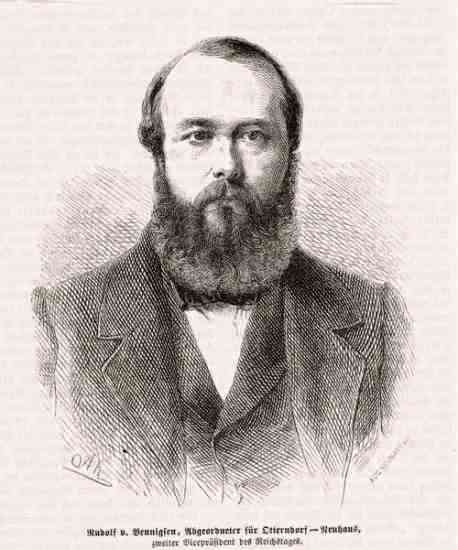

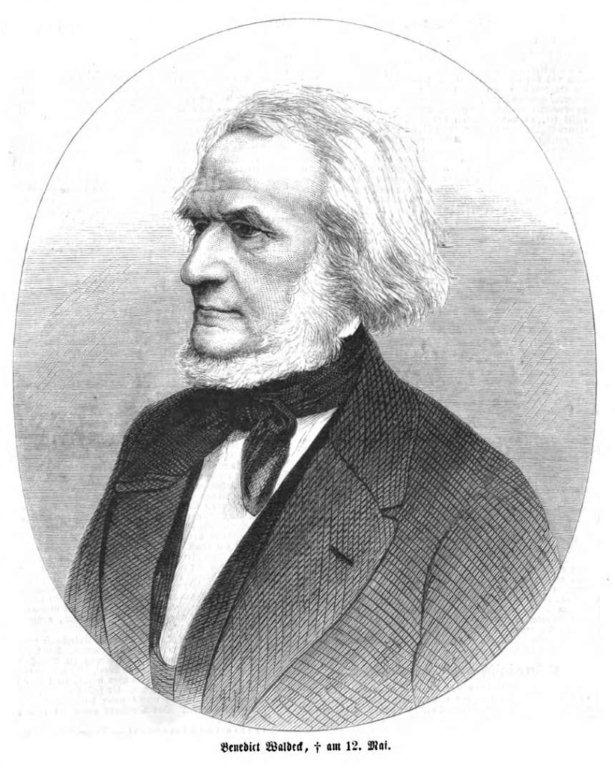

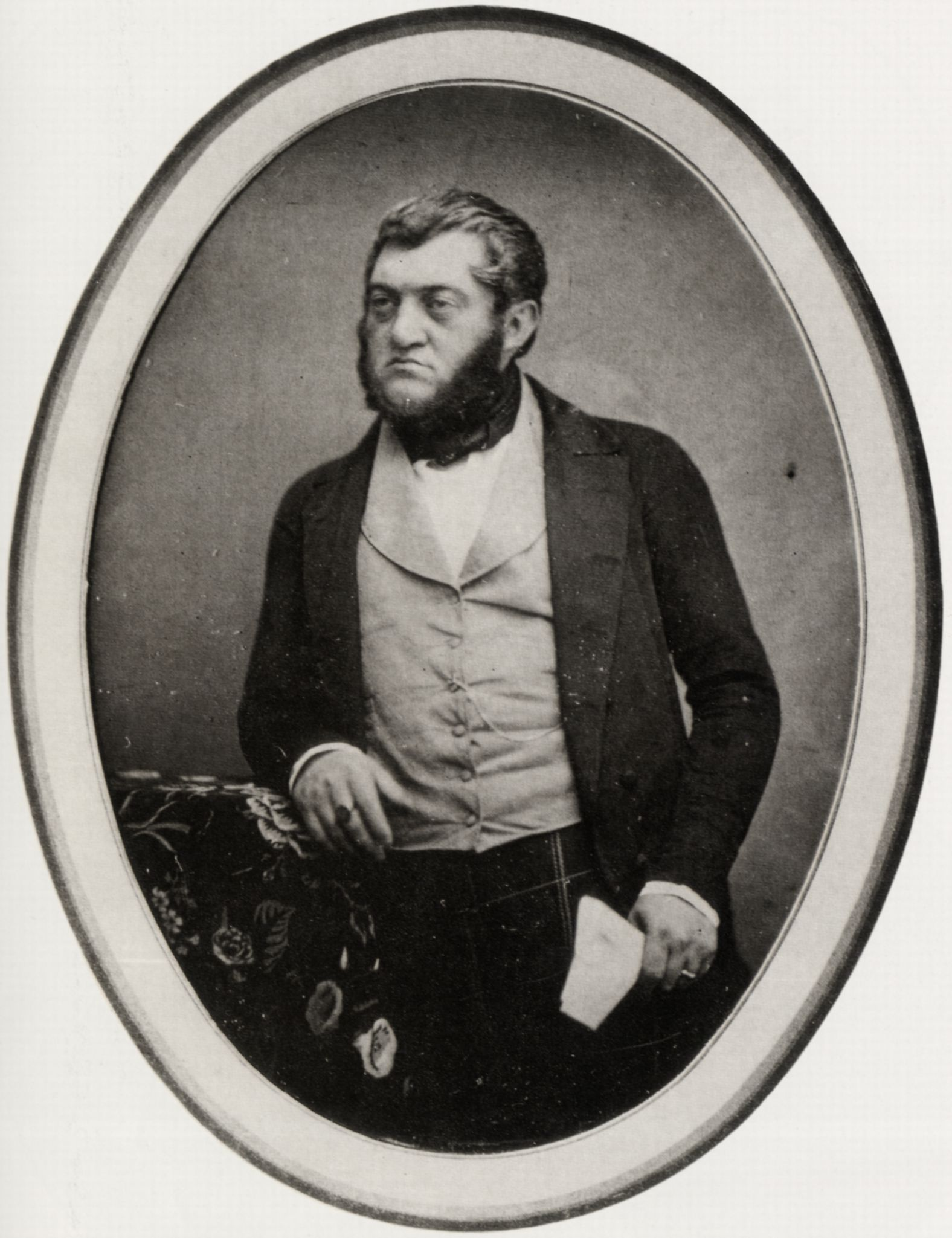
	First party	Second party	Third party
		DKP	DRP
Leader	Rudolf von Bennigsen		Eduard Georg von Bethusy-Huc (nominal)
Party	NlP	Conservatives	DRP
Leader since	1867		1866
Last election	20.19%, 78 seats	16.86%, 63 seats	9.33%, 39 seats
Seats won	80	66	36
Seat change	▲2	▲3	▼3
Popular vote	414,043	480,775	205,792
Percentage	18.02%	20.92%	8.95%
Swing	▼2.17 pp	▲4.06 pp	▼0.38 pp
	Fourth party	Fifth party	Sixth party
			Polen
Leader	Benedict Waldeck	Georg von Vincke
Party	DFP	Old Liberals	Polish Party
Leader since	1867	1858
Last election	7.40%, 19 seats	7.12%, 31 seats	5.61%, 13 seats
Seats won	32	15	11
Seat change	▲13	▼16	▼2
Popular vote	290,500	107,758	169,006
Percentage	12.64%	4.69%	7.35%
Swing	▲5.24 pp	▼2.43 pp	▲1.70 pp
- Map of results (by constituencies)
President of the Reichstag before election
Eduard von Simson
Independent
President of the Reichstag after election
Eduard von Simson
Independent

Elections to the Reichstag of the North German Confederation were held on 31 August 1867, with run-off elections during the following weeks. The National Liberal Party continued to serve as the largest party, winning 81 seats. These were both the first regular and also the last elections during the North German Confederation. In July 1870 the Reichstag members decided not to hold new elections during the Franco-Prussian War, in spite of the three-year election period.

== Electoral system ==
The North German Confederation was divided into 297 single-member electoral constituencies, of which 236 were in Prussia. All men over the age of 25 and not in receipt of public assistance were eligible to vote.

== Results ==
Graph of the party split among 297 seats.
Party	Votes	%	+/–	Seats	+/–
Conservative Party	480,775	20.92	+4.06	66	+3
National Liberal Party	414,043	18.02	−2.17	80	+2
Progress Party	290,500	12.64	+5.24	32	+13
Free Conservative Party	205,792	8.95	−0.38	36	−3
Polish Party	169,006	7.35	+1.70	11	−2
Independent Conservatives	166,259	7.23	−2.04	6	−3
Other Liberals	152,219	6.62	−3.54	0	±0
Independent Liberals	135,256	5.89	+0.78	32	+9
Old Liberals	107,758	4.69	−2.43	15	−16
Clericals	48,136	2.09	−0.25	8	−1
German-Hanoverian Party	28,581	1.24	−1.75	4	−5
Danish Party	25,398	1.11	+0.37	1	−1
General German Workers' Association	25,391	1.10	+0.52	2	+2
Saxon People's Party	12,590	0.55	−0.06	3	+1
Lassallean General German Workers' Association	2,521	0.11	+0.03	1	+1
Others	33,559	1.46	+0.41	0	±0
Unknown	495	0.02	−0.55	0	±0
Total	2,298,279	100.00	–	297	0
Source: Wahlen in Deutschland
