= Polish Party =

German political party (1871–1919)

Polish Party Koło Polskie (Polish) Polenpartei (German)
- Founded: 1848
- Dissolved: 1918
- Preceded by: Polish National Committee (1848)
- Succeeded by: Polish People's Party "Piast"; National People's Union
- Newspaper: Dziennik Poznański; Gazeta Toruńska
- Ideology: Polish nationalism Political Catholicism; Defense of Polish minority rights
- Religion: Roman Catholicism (unofficial)

The Polish Party (German: Polnische Partei) was a political party in the German Empire and the Free City of Danzig. Representing the Polish population in Germany, it was the largest of the minority parties.

== History ==
The party had its origins in the national associations that were established during the 1848 revolution, but was formally established when the first Reichstag was elected in 1871. It won 13 seats in the elections, the lowest number of seats it held in the Reichstag until World War I. Its best performance was in the 1907 elections, when it won 20 seats.

Following the war and the loss of Polish-dominated territory to newly established Poland, the party ceased to exist.

== Ideology ==
The party opposed the Germanisation and secularisation policies of the government, seeking to protect the rights of Poles living in Germany. It was usually allied with the Centre Party and other minority parties.

== Election results ==
Election	Votes	%	Seats	+/–
February 1867	209,382	5.61	13 / 297	–
August 1867	169,006	7.35	11 / 297	▼2
1871	176,342	4.54	13 / 382	▲2
1874	208,797	4.02	14 / 397	▲1
1877	216,157	4.00	14 / 397	Steady
1878	216,148	3.75	14 / 397	Steady
1881	200,734	3.94	18 / 397	▲4
1884	209,825	3.71	16 / 397	▼2
1887	227,835	3.02	13 / 397	▼3

== See also ==
- Sejm of the Grand Duchy of Posen
