= Saxon People's Party =

Saxon People's Party Sächsische Volkspartei
- Leader: August Bebel; Wilhelm Liebknecht
- Founded: 19 August 1866; 159 years ago
- Dissolved: 8 August 1869; 156 years ago
- Merged into: Social Democratic Workers' Party of Germany
- Ideology: Radical democracy Radicalism; Labourism; Socialism
- Political position: Far-left (Note: Saxon People's Party held the most radical anti-Prussian and socialist stance within the Reichstag, and its representatives physically sat on the far-left side of the chamber.)
- Colors: Red

The Saxon People's Party (German: Sächsische Volkspartei) was a left-liberal and radical democratic party with socialist leanings in Germany, founded by Wilhelm Liebknecht and August Bebel on 19 August 1866 in Chemnitz, and integrated into the newly-founded Social Democratic Workers' Party (SDAP) on 8 August 1869. It was an alliance between liberal, anti-Prussian bourgeois and socialist workers' organizations in Saxony. It is considered one of the precursors to the Social Democratic Party of Germany.

In the preamble to the Chemnitz program of the Saxon People's Party, they committed themselves to "[...] fighting the enemies of German freedom and unity under all circumstances and in all areas [...]". It called for "[...] the unrestricted right of self-determination of the German people [...]", the promotion of "[...] general prosperity [...]" and "[...] the liberation of work and the workers from any pressure and any bondage [...] ]".

== Founding ==
Immediately after Prussia's victory against Austria in the German War and the founding of the North German Confederation on August 18, 1866, this party represented an alliance of convenience between radical democrats, Marxists and bourgeois, united by the common goal of curbing Prussian dominance in the new confederation of states. It shared this goal with the southern German liberals, who had formed the German People's Party, a splinter group of the German Progress Party. However the difference between the South German and Saxon "Liberals" was the socialist component, which was significantly more important in the Saxon People's Party with its claim to represent the interests of the workers' movement.

== Principles ==
In contrast to Prussia and the rival social democratic party there, the General German Workers' Association (ADAV), the Saxon People's Party favored a "Greater German solution" more strongly oriented towards federalism, i.e., a German unification including Austria with more rights for the individual countries, while in Prussia a "small German solution" (without Austria) was preferred in order to ensure Prussia's political dominance in a German nation-state.

The victory of Prussia over Austria and the founding of the North German Confederation, which replaced the German Confederation that had existed since the Congress of Vienna in 1815 and which tied the German principalities north of the Main line more closely to Prussia, was a first step by the conservative Prussian Prime Minister and North German Chancellor Otto von Bismarck to enforce the Kleindeutsch solution and thus secure the monarchical principle under the sovereignty of the Prussian Hohenzollern. While Bismarck was always reluctant to unify the Reich, he was realistic enough to realize that he could not permanently suppress liberal and nation-state ideas.

For the Saxon People's Party, Bismarck's policies stood for anti-democratic reaction, militarism and the police state. In the elections to the North German Reichstag in 1867, the Saxon People's Party won three seats. Alongside the more liberal Reinhold Schraps, Wilhelm Liebknecht and August Bebel, who represented the party's socialist-Marxist wing, also became deputies in the new Reichstag in Berlin, where they joined the left-liberal German People's Party in opposing the Prussian government's policies. However, from the outset the party was too weak, its wings too disparate and the political situation too clear to be able to push through its goals with regard to the national question.

On the other hand, the social question and the representation of political interests of the working class gained even more weight in the party. The bourgeois wing crumbled away.

== Demise and merger into the SDAP ==
After three years of existence, the Saxon People's Party was finally dissolved and replaced by a new party in which its left-wing Marxist wing was absorbed: the Social Democratic Workers' Party of Germany (SDAP) was founded on August 1, 1869 under the leadership of Bebel and Liebknecht in Eisenach as a national party. Both retained their seats in the Reichstag, now for this new socialist party.

After the founding of the German Reich as an empire as a result of the Prussian-North German victory over France in the Franco-Prussian War in 1871, the rivalry between the SDAP and ADAV was also superfluous. Both parties united in Gotha in 1875 to form the Socialist Workers' Party of Germany (SAP). After the abolition of the repressive anti-socialist laws that applied from 1878 to 1890 and a renaming in 1890, the Social Democratic Party of Germany (SPD) finally emerged, which has operated under this name to this day, despite many program changes.

== See also ==
- Liberalism in Germany
- Reichstag (North German Confederation)
