= Social Democratic Workers' Party of Germany =

Social Democratic Workers' Party of Germany Sozialdemokratische Arbeiterpartei Deutschlands
- Leader: August Bebel; Wilhelm Liebknecht
- Founded: 8 August 1869; 157 years ago
- Dissolved: May 1875; 151 years ago
- Preceded by: Saxon People's Party
- Merged into: Social Democratic Party of Germany
- Newspaper: Demokratisches Wochenblatt; Der Volksstaat
- Ideology: Marxism; Scientific socialism Factions: Communism; Democratic socialism
- Political position: Left-wing to far-left (Note: As a Marxist and revolutionary organization, the SDAP was considered the most radical element of German politics, forming the "extreme left" of the political spectrum and facing severe state repression. While the SDAP held a revolutionary stance, its successor, the SPD, gradually moved toward the centre-left in the 20th century, particularly after the expulsion of its more radical wings during the German revolution of 1918–1919 and the formal abandonment of Marxist doctrine in the 1959 Godesberg Program.)
- International affiliation: International Workingmen's Association
- Colors: Red

The Social Democratic Workers' Party of Germany (Note: Sometimes translated as Social Democratic Labor Party of Germany (Lindemann, 1984).) (German: Sozialdemokratische Arbeiterpartei Deutschlands, SDAP) was a Marxist socialist political party in the North German Confederation during unification.

Founded in Eisenach in 1869, the SDAP endured through the early years of the German Empire. Often termed the Eisenachers, the SDAP was one of the first political organizations established among the nascent German labor unions of the 19th century. It officially existed under the name SDAP for only six years (1869–1875). However, through name changes and political partnerships, its lineage can be traced to the present-day Social Democratic Party of Germany (SPD).

== Origins ==
=== VDAV and ADAV ===
The SDAP was one of the earliest organizations to arise from German workers' unionizing activity, but it was not the first. At the group's founding in 1869, the fast-growing working class of the Industrial Revolution had already established several notable associations for workers' advocacy. Chief among these were Leopold Sonnemann's Assembly of German Worker Associations (Verband Deutscher Arbeitervereine, VDAV) and Ferdinand Lassalle's General German Workers' Association (Allgemeiner Deutscher Arbeiterverein, ADAV).

The largest group by far was the VDAV. Through the 1860s, it remained mostly apolitical, dedicated to pocketbook matters and fully integrated with the paradigms of liberal economic interests. The VDAV did its best to ignore the political agitation of Lassalle's much smaller yet more active ADAV. The Lassalleans were seen as insufficiently committed to basic economic matters. Much of their political appeal was based on what socialists considered to be an alarming militancy in support of German nationalism and the question of Greater Germany. They displayed a discomfiting closeness to the militaristic Kingdom of Prussia. Eventually, the sundry turmoil created by the German unification wars helped politicize large elements of the previously unmoved VDAV. Some followed Sonnemann to the new moderately socialist German People's Party (founded in 1868), while others were ready to abandon the VDAV structure altogether and establish a more radical political party.

=== Eisenachers ===
Meeting in the city of Eisenach in Saxony, the VDAV activists founded the Social Democratic Workers' Party (SDAP) on 7–9 August 1869. The Eisenachers, as they came to be called, were under the leadership of Wilhelm Liebknecht and August Bebel.

The political theorist Karl Marx had a significant personal influence upon the newly formed party, being a friend and mentor to both Bebel and Liebknecht. Marx and Friedrich Engels steered the party toward more Marxian socialism and welcomed them (as far as German law would allow) into their International Workingmen's Association (IWA).

== Platform and organisation ==
The SDAP was typically deemed Marxist by most observers although that term was somewhat amorphous during Marx's lifetime. The party was described as such mainly because of its IWA membership and Liebknecht's close personal relationship with Marx.

The true nature of Eisenacher Marxism was closer to democratic socialism than the communist parties of later decades. The party platform called for a free people's state (freier Volkstaat), which could align private co-operatives with state organisations. The party primarily supported trade unionism as the utility by which workers could prosper in the context of capitalism.

=== Der Volksstaat ===
The party press was a vital element of the SDAP's political strategy. The party's newspaper was first called Demokratisches Wochenblatt (Democratic Weekly Paper) and later Der Volksstaat (The People's State) and was edited by Liebknecht. The paper was published in Leipzig from 2 October 1869 to 23 September 1876. The party did not yet have its own printers, but Liebknecht was ambitious in his efforts to promote its publications on a wide scale as educational tools for workers. Although most issues of Der Volksstaat were primarily composed of incendiary writing about the German political situation, Liebknecht attempted as much as possible to include essays on political theory, transcripts of academic lectures and even some popular fiction.

== Congress at Gotha ==
Despite their differences, the SDAP and Lassalle's ADAV shared a largely identical interpretation of socialism. The similarity was significant enough to mean that they were both routinely monitored and considered equally suspicious by the authorities. The two parties were vying for the same audience among the working class, and they were doing so simultaneously with several more moderate liberal organizations. The critical distinction among all the groups' positions was their level of commitment to the right to strike.

=== SAPD and SPD ===
The competition between moderate and radical factions reached a boiling point when SDAP and Lassalle's ADAV finally merged to form a united front. In a convention at Gotha in 1875, the new fusion party was renamed the Socialist Workers' Party of Germany (Note: Not to be confused with the Socialist Workers' Party of Germany (also SAPD) which existed from 1931 to 1945.) (German: Sozialistische Arbeiterpartei Deutschlands, SAPD). The resultant Gotha Program largely satisfied the conventioneers, but when Marx was asked for comment, he denounced the new policies in the scathing Critique of the Gotha Program (1875).

Despite its relatively moderate stance, the SAPD organization was deemed subversive and officially banned by the German Empire under the Anti-Socialist Laws of 1878. Under proscription, the party's members continued to organize successfully. After the ban was lifted in 1890, it renamed itself the Social Democratic Party of Germany (Sozialdemokratische Partei Deutschlands, SPD) and surged at the polls. By the 1912 elections, the SPD, a direct descendant of the small SDAP, had become the largest party in Germany.

== Legacy ==
Logo of the modern SPD

Though the SDAP dissolved after a brief lifespan of just six years, it was an essential catalyst in creating the first significant labor party in Germany. After World War II, members of the SPD in East Germany were compelled to join forces with the Communist Party to form the Socialist Unity Party. Throughout its 41-year rule, the party paid regular tribute to its Marxist progenitor. In West Germany, the SPD became one of the two major parties and continues to wield vast influence in the post-reunification era. It still traces its lineage back to the SDAP at Gotha and Eisenach.

== See also ==
- History of the Social Democratic Party of Germany
