= Old Liberals =

19C term and political faction in Prussia

The Old Liberals (German: Altliberale) were 19th-century liberals who, after 1849, stood in the tradition of the moderate, constitutional liberalism of the Vormärz and the revolution of 1848/49. In a narrower sense, the term refers to a parliamentary group in the Prussian House of Representatives. Its origin was the Vincke faction in the 1850s. After 1866, if they had not gone over to the German Progress Party in 1861, their deputies became part of the National Liberal Party or the Free Conservative Party.

The term altliberal is contemporary and was used by Robert von Mohl after 1849 to describe the supporters of a constitutional system of government.

== Literature ==
- Gerd Fesser : Old Liberals (Al) 1849–1876. In: Dieter Fricke and others (ed.): Encyclopedia of party history. Vol. 1. Bibliographic Institute, Leipzig 1983, DNB 850223156, pp. 59–65.
- Walter Tormin : History of the German parties since 1848. 2nd edition. Kohlhammer, Stuttgart et al. 1967, DNB 458434701, pp. 48, 57, 59.

== See also ==
- History of liberalism
