= Economic history of Germany =

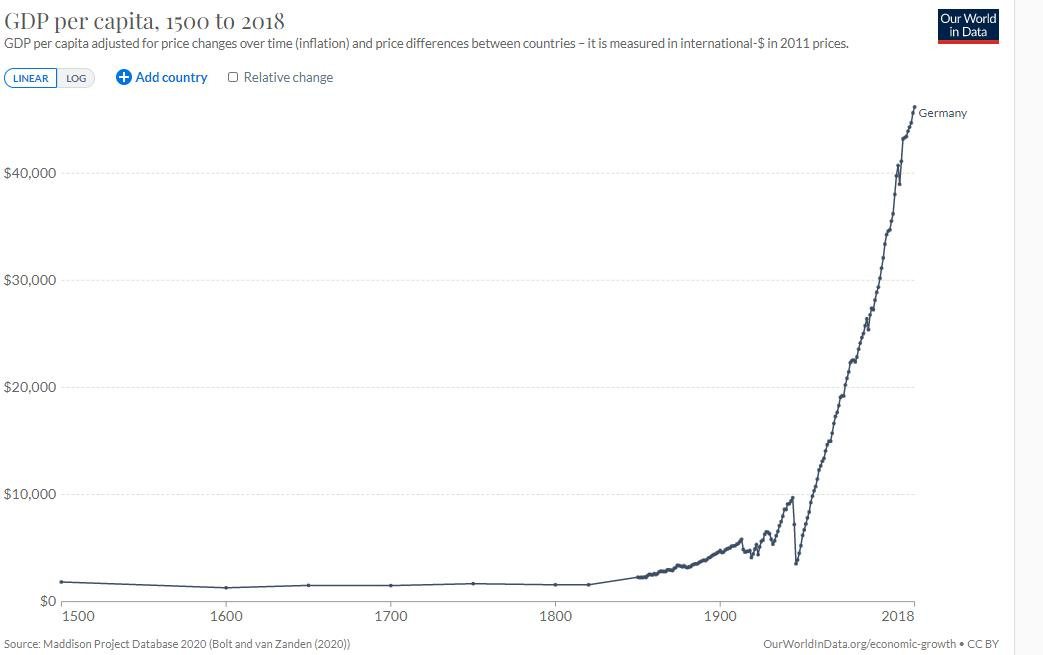
GDP per capita in Germany (1500 to 2018)

Until the early 19th century, Germany, a federation of numerous states of varying size and development, retained its pre-industrial character, where trade centered around a number of free cities. After the extensive development of the railway network during the 1840s, rapid economic growth and modernization sparked the process of industrialization. Under Prussian leadership Germany was united in 1871 and its economy grew rapidly. The largest economy in Europe by 1900, Germany had established a primary position in several key sectors, like the chemical industry and steel production. High production capacity, permanent competitiveness and subsequent protectionist policies fought out with the US and Britain were essential characteristics.

By the end of World War II, Germany's economic infrastructure had been largely destroyed. West Germany embarked on a program of reconstruction supported by investment under the U.S. Marshall Plan and guided by the economic policies of the Minister of Economics Ludwig Erhard, contributing to the Wirtschaftswunder (economic miracle) of the 1950s and 1960s. East Germany became part of the Eastern Bloc and operated under a centrally planned socialist economy, with living standards generally lagging behind those of Western Germany. Following German reunification in 1990, the country underwent significant structural changes as the former East German economy was integrated into the market economy.

Today, Germany has a highly skilled work force and the largest economy in Europe. It is one of the world's largest exporters of high-value manufactured goods, including cars, machinery, pharmaceutics, chemical and electrical equipment. Germany had a gross domestic product (GDP) of US$3.67 trillion in 2017.

== Medieval Germany ==
Medieval Germany, lying on the open Northern European Plain, was divided into hundreds of contending kingdoms, principalities, dukedoms/duchies, bishoprics/dioceses, and free cities. Economic prosperity did not mean geographical expansion; it required collaboration with some, competition with others, and an intimate understanding among government, commerce, and production. A desire to save was also born in the German experience of political, military, and economic uncertainty.

=== Towns and cities ===
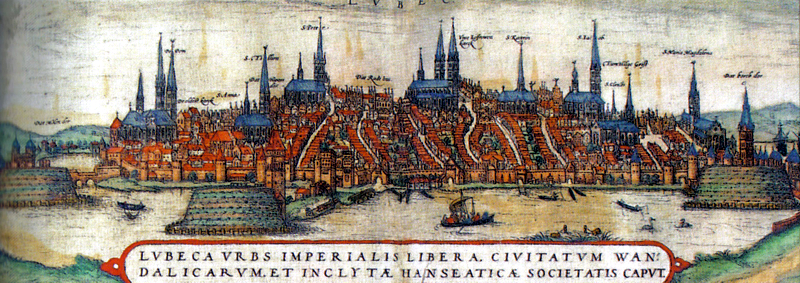
Lübeck, 15th century

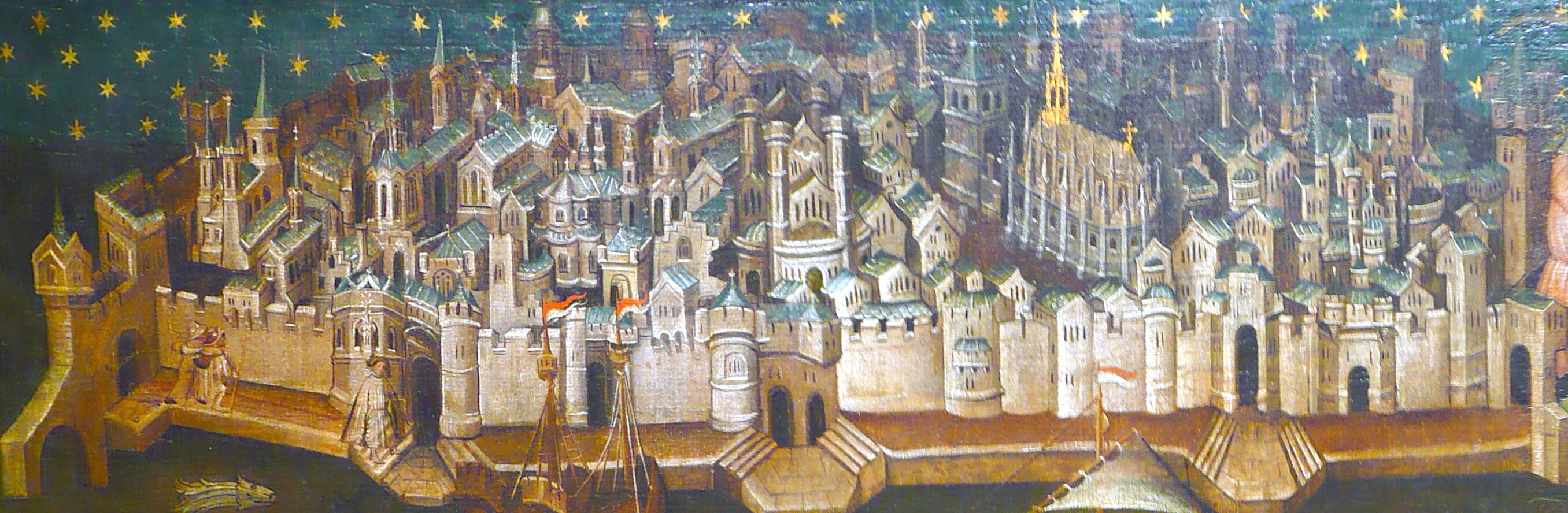
Cologne around 1411

Total population estimates of the German territories range around 5 to 6 million by the end of Henry III's reign in 1056 and about 7 to 8 million after Friedrich Barbarossa's rule in 1190. The vast majority were farmers, typically in a state of serfdom under the control of nobles and monasteries. Towns gradually emerged and in the 12th century many new cities were founded along the trading routes and near imperial strongholds and castles. The towns were subjected to the municipal legal system. Cities such as Cologne, that had acquired the status of Imperial Free Cities, were no longer answerable to the local landlords or bishops, but immediate subjects of the Emperor and enjoyed greater commercial and legal liberties. The towns were ruled by a council of the - usually mercantile - elite, the patricians. Craftsmen formed guilds, governed by strict rules, which sought to obtain control of the towns; a few were open to women. Society had diversified, but was divided into sharply demarcated classes of the clergy, physicians, merchants, various guilds of artisans, unskilled day laborers and peasants. Full citizenship was not available to paupers. Political tensions arose from issues of taxation, public spending, regulation of business, and market supervision, as well as the limits of corporate autonomy. Cologne's central location on the Rhine river placed it at the intersection of the major trade routes between east and west and was the basis of Cologne's growth. The economic structures of medieval and early modern Cologne were characterized by the city's status as a major harbor and transport hub upon the Rhine. It was governed by its burghers.

=== Hanseatic League ===
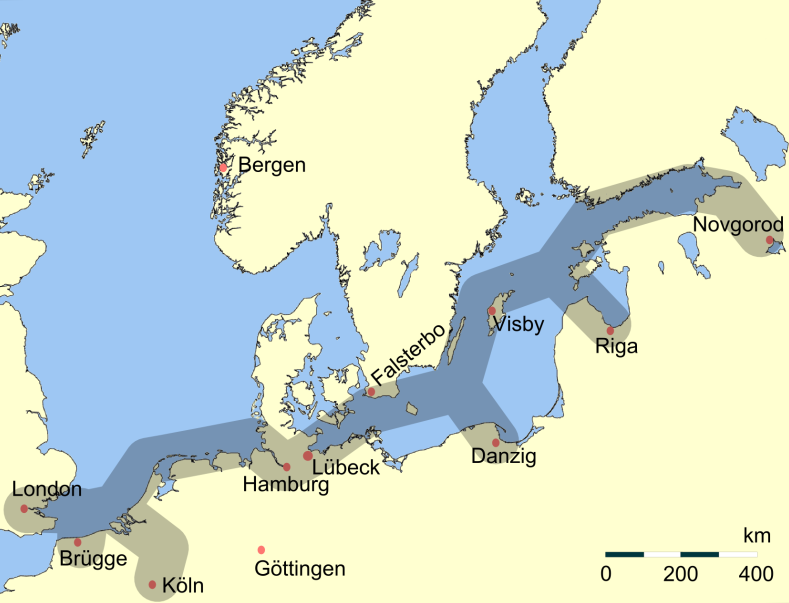
Main trading routes of the Hanseatic League

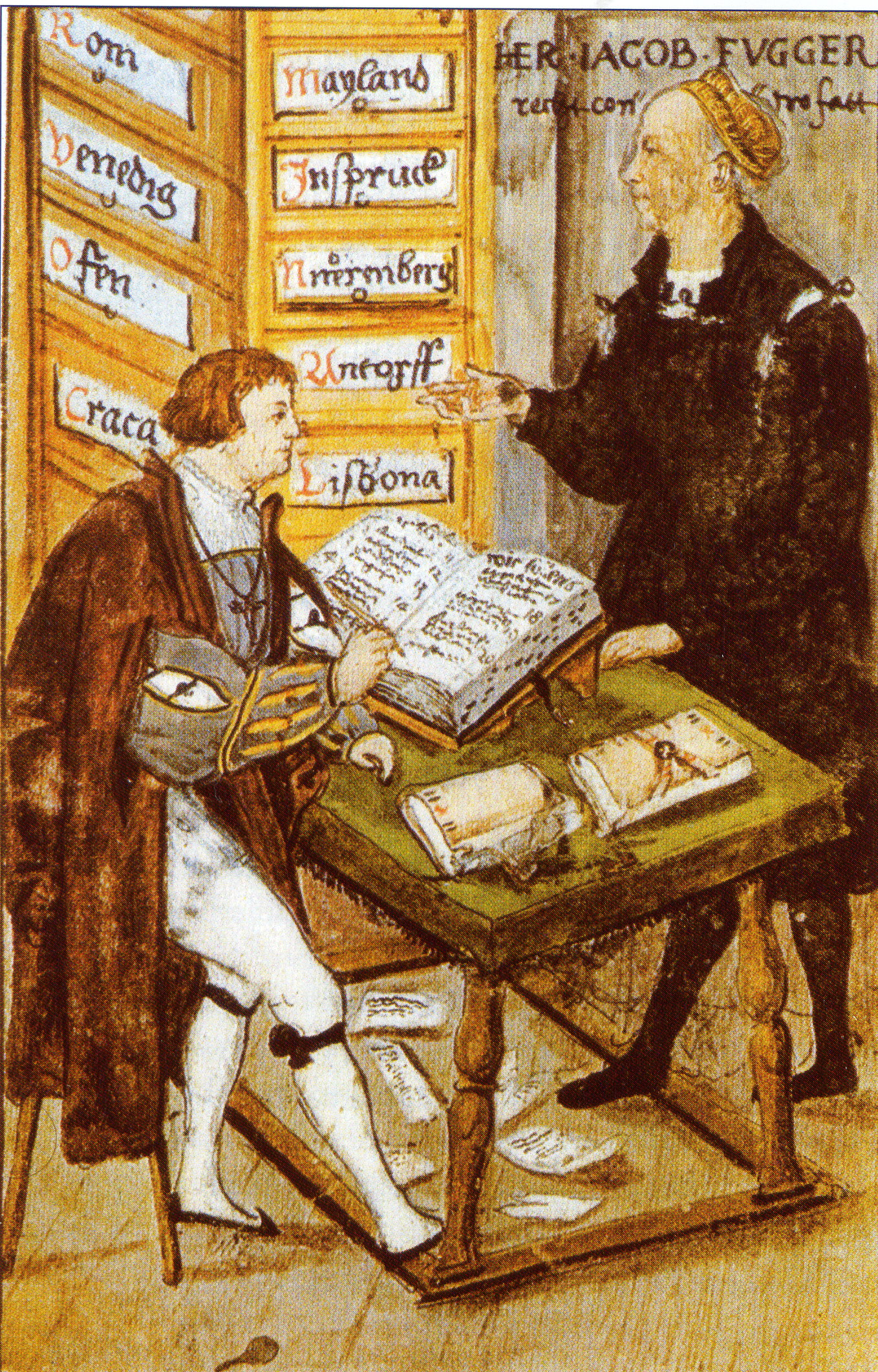
Jacob Fugger (right) and his accountant M. Schwarz

The Hanseatic League was a commercial and defensive alliance of the merchant guilds of towns and cities in northern and central Europe. It dominated marine trade in the Baltic Sea, the North Sea and along the connected navigable rivers during the Late Middle Ages (12th to 15th centuries). Each of the affiliated cities retained the legal system of its sovereign and, with the exception of the Free imperial cities, had only a limited degree of political autonomy. Beginning with an agreement of the cities of Lübeck and Hamburg, guilds cooperated in order to strengthen and combine their economic assets, like securing trading routes and tax privileges, to control prices and better protect and market their local commodities. Important centers of commerce within the empire, such as Cologne on the Rhine river and Bremen on the North Sea joined the union, which resulted in greater diplomatic esteem. Recognized by the various regional princes for the great economic potential, favorable charters for, often exclusive, commercial operations were granted. During its zenith the alliance maintained trading posts and kontors in virtually all cities between London and Edinburgh in the west to Novgorod in the east and Bergen in Norway. By the late 14th century the powerful league enforced its interests with military means, if necessary. This culminated in a war with the sovereign Kingdom of Denmark from 1361 to 1370. The principal city of the Hanseatic League remained Lübeck, where in 1356 the first general diet was held and its official structure was announced. The league declined after 1450 due to a number of factors, such as the 15th-century crisis, the territorial lords' shifting policies towards greater commercial control, the silver crisis and marginalization in the wider Eurasian trade network, among others.

Between 1347 and 1351 Germany and Europe were haunted by the most severe outbreak of the Black Death pandemic. Estimated to have caused the abrupt death of 30 to 60% of Europe's population, it led to widespread social and economic disruption and deep religious disaffection and fanaticism. Minority groups, and Jews in particular were blamed, singled out and attacked. As a consequence, many Jews fled and resettled in Eastern Europe. The death of large parts of the population caused a major collapse of the labor force. Human power became a rare commodity and the social and economic situation of average workers improved for several decades as employers were forced to pay higher wages.

=== Change and reform ===
The early-modern European society gradually developed after the disasters of the 14th century as religious obedience and political loyalties declined in the wake of the Great Plague, the schism of the Church and prolonged dynastic wars. The rise of the cities and the emergence of the new burgher class eroded the societal, legal and economic order of feudalism. The commercial enterprises of the mercantile patriciate family of the Fuggers of Augsburg generated unprecedented financial means. As financiers to both the leading ecclesiastical and secular rulers, the Fuggers fundamentally influenced the political affairs in the empire during the 15th and 16th centuries. The increasingly money-based economy also provoked social discontentment among knights and peasants and predatory "robber knights" became common. The knightly classes had traditionally established their monopoly through warfare and military skill. However, the shift to practical mercenary infantry armies and military-technical advances led to a marginalization of heavy cavalry.

== Early modern Germany ==
Unlike most Western European countries, Germany as a domain of the Holy Roman Empire, which lacked a strong centralized leadership, did not embark on the exploration of the world during the Age of Discovery in the 16th and 17th centuries, nor did it establish a trading fleet, trading posts and colonies during the subsequent era of colonialism. As a consequence Germany's society remained stagnant as its economy played only a secondary role with limited access to international markets and resources, while in France, Britain and the Netherlands, worldwide trade and colonial possessions greatly empowered mercantile and industrial groups and led to the rise of a bourgeoisie, who was able to benefit from the new economic opportunities.

=== Thirty Years' War ===
The Thirty Years' War (1618–1648) was ruinous to the twenty million civilians and set back the economy for generations, as marauding armies burned and destroyed what they could not seize. The fighting often was out of control, with marauding bands of hundreds or thousands of starving soldiers spreading plague, plunder, and murder. The armies that were under control moved back and forth across the countryside year after year, levying heavy taxes on cities, and seizing the animals and food stocks of the peasants without payment. The enormous social disruption over three decades caused a dramatic decline in population because of killings, disease, crop failures, declining birth rates and random destruction, and the emigration of terrified people. One estimate shows a 38% drop from 16 million people in 1618 to 10 million by 1650, while another shows "only" a 20% drop from 20 million to 16 million. The Altmark and Württemberg regions were especially hard hit. It took generations for Germany to fully recover.

According to John Gagliardo, the recovery period lasted for about fifty years until the end of the century and was over by the 1700s. At that time, Germany probably had reached its pre-war population (though this is disputed). Then, there was a period of steady though quite slow growth to the 1740s. Afterward came a period of rapid but not exceptional economic expansion, that mainly occurred in the great states in the east (Austria, Saxony, Prussia) rather than in the small states of central or south Germany.

=== Peasants and rural life ===
Peasants continued to center their lives in the village, where they were members of a corporate body and helped manage the community resources and monitor the community life. Across Germany and especially in the east, they were serfs who were bound permanently to parcels of land. In most of Germany, farming was handled by tenant farmers who paid rents and obligatory services to the landlord, who was typically a nobleman. Peasant leaders supervised the fields and ditches and grazing rights, maintained public order and morals, and supported a village court which handled minor offenses. Within the family, the patriarch made all the decisions, and tried to arrange advantageous marriages for his children. Much of the villages' communal life centered around church services and holy days. In Prussia, the peasants drew lots to choose conscription required by the army. The noblemen handled external relationships and politics for the villages under their control, and were not typically involved in daily activities or decisions.

The emancipation of the serfs came in 1770–1830, beginning with then Danish Schleswig in 1780. Prussia abolished serfdom with the October Edict of 1807, which upgraded the personal legal status of the peasantry and gave them the chance to purchase for cash part of the lands they were working. They could also sell the land they already owned. The edict applied to all peasants whose holdings were above a certain size, and included both crown lands and noble estates. The peasants were freed from the obligation of personal services to the lord and annual dues. A bank was set up so that a landowner could borrow government money to buy land from peasants (the peasants were not allowed to use it to borrow money to buy land until 1850). The result was that the large landowners obtained larger estates, and many peasants became landless tenants, or moved to the cities or to America. The other German states imitated Prussia after 1815. In sharp contrast to the violence that characterized land reform in the French Revolution, Germany handled it peacefully. In Schleswig the peasants, who had been influenced by the Enlightenment, played an active role; elsewhere they were largely passive. Indeed, for most peasants, customs and traditions continued largely unchanged, including the old habits of deference to the nobles whose legal authority remained quite strong over the villagers. Although the peasants were no longer tied to the same land like serfs had been, the old paternalistic relationship in East Prussia lasted into the 20th century.

== Industrial Revolution ==
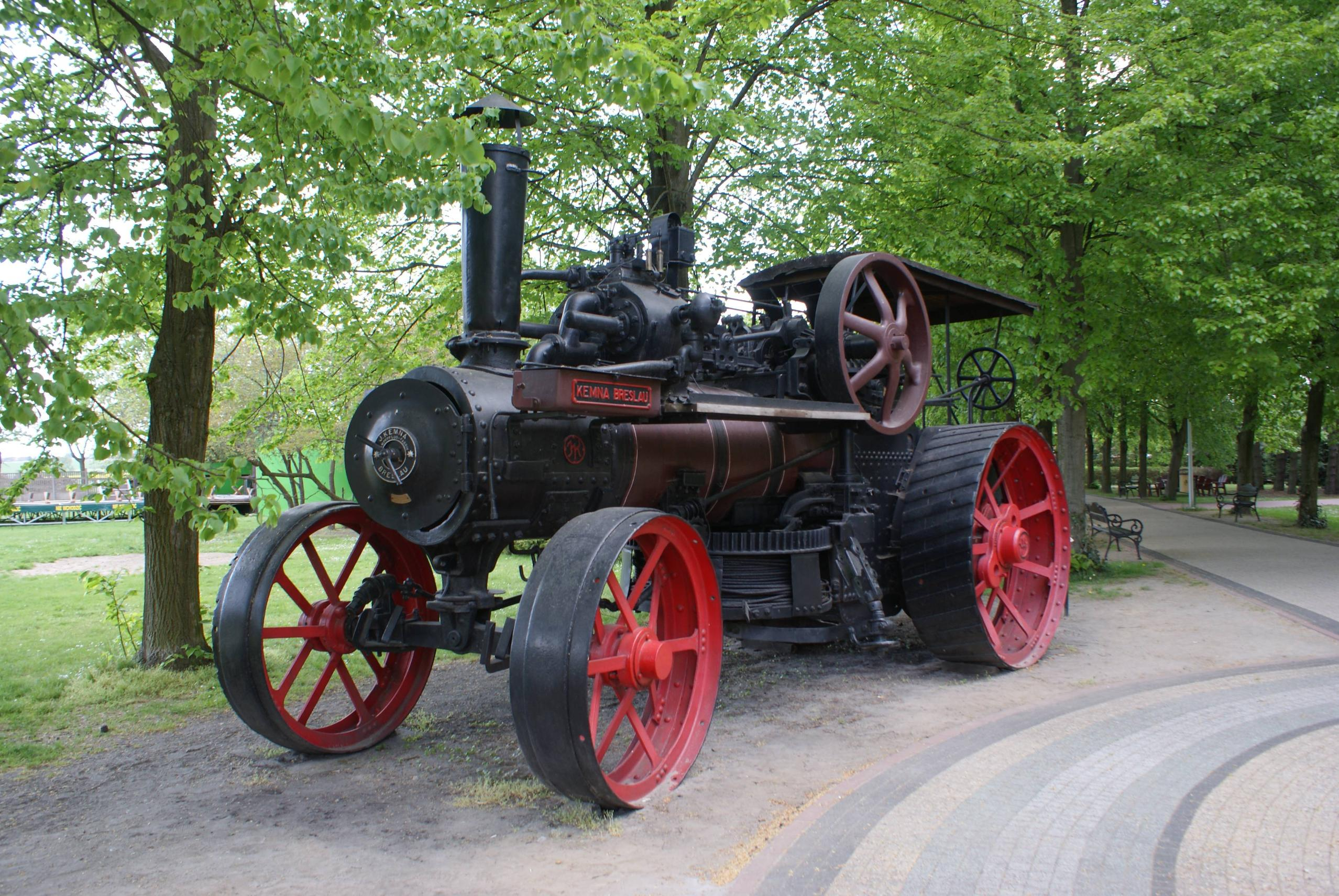
An early Kemna plowing engine

Before 1850 Germany lagged behind the leaders in industrial development, the United Kingdom, France and Belgium. However, the country had considerable assets: a highly skilled labor force, a good educational system, a strong work ethic, good standards of living and a sound protectionist strategy based on the Zollverein. By mid-century, the German states were catching up, and by 1900 Germany was a world leader in industrialization, along with Britain and the United States. In 1800, Germany's social structure was poorly suited to any kind of social or industrial development. Domination by modernizing France during the era of the French Revolution (1790s to 1815) produced important institutional reforms, including the abolition of feudal restrictions on the sale of large landed estates, the reduction of the power of the guilds in the cities, and the introduction of a new, more efficient commercial law. Nevertheless, traditionalism remained strong in most of Germany. Until mid-century, the guilds, the landed aristocracy, the churches, and the government bureaucracies had so many rules and restrictions that entrepreneurship was held in low esteem, and given little opportunity to develop. The 1867 Passport Law let workers search for work in their own interest. Freedom of movement went hand in hand with destruction of guilds and freedom of entry into all occupations.

From the 1830s and 1840s, Prussia, Saxony, and other states reorganized agriculture, introducing sugar beets, turnips, and potatoes, yielding a higher level of food production that enabled a surplus rural population to move to industrial areas. The beginning of the industrial revolution in Germany came in the textile industry, and was facilitated by eliminating tariff barriers through the Zollverein, starting in 1834. The takeoff stage of economic development came with the railroad revolution in the 1840s, which opened up new markets for local products, created a pool of middle managers, increased the demand for engineers, architects and skilled machinists, and stimulated investments in coal and iron. The political decisions about the economy of Prussia (and after 1871, all of Germany) were largely controlled by a coalition of "rye and iron", that is the Junker landowners of the east and the heavy industry of the west.

=== Regions ===
The north German states were for the most part richer in natural resources than the southern states. They had vast agricultural tracts from Schleswig-Holstein in the west through Prussia in the east. They also had coal and iron in the Ruhr Valley. Through the practice of primogeniture, widely followed in northern Germany, large estates and fortunes grew. So did close relations between the owners and local as well as national governments.

The south German states were relatively poor in natural resources and those Germans therefore engaged more often in small economic enterprises. They also had no primogeniture rule but subdivided the land among several offspring, leading those offspring to remain in their native towns but not fully able to support themselves from their small parcels of land. The south German states, therefore, fostered cottage industries, crafts, and a more independent and self-reliant spirit less closely linked to the government.

=== Coal ===
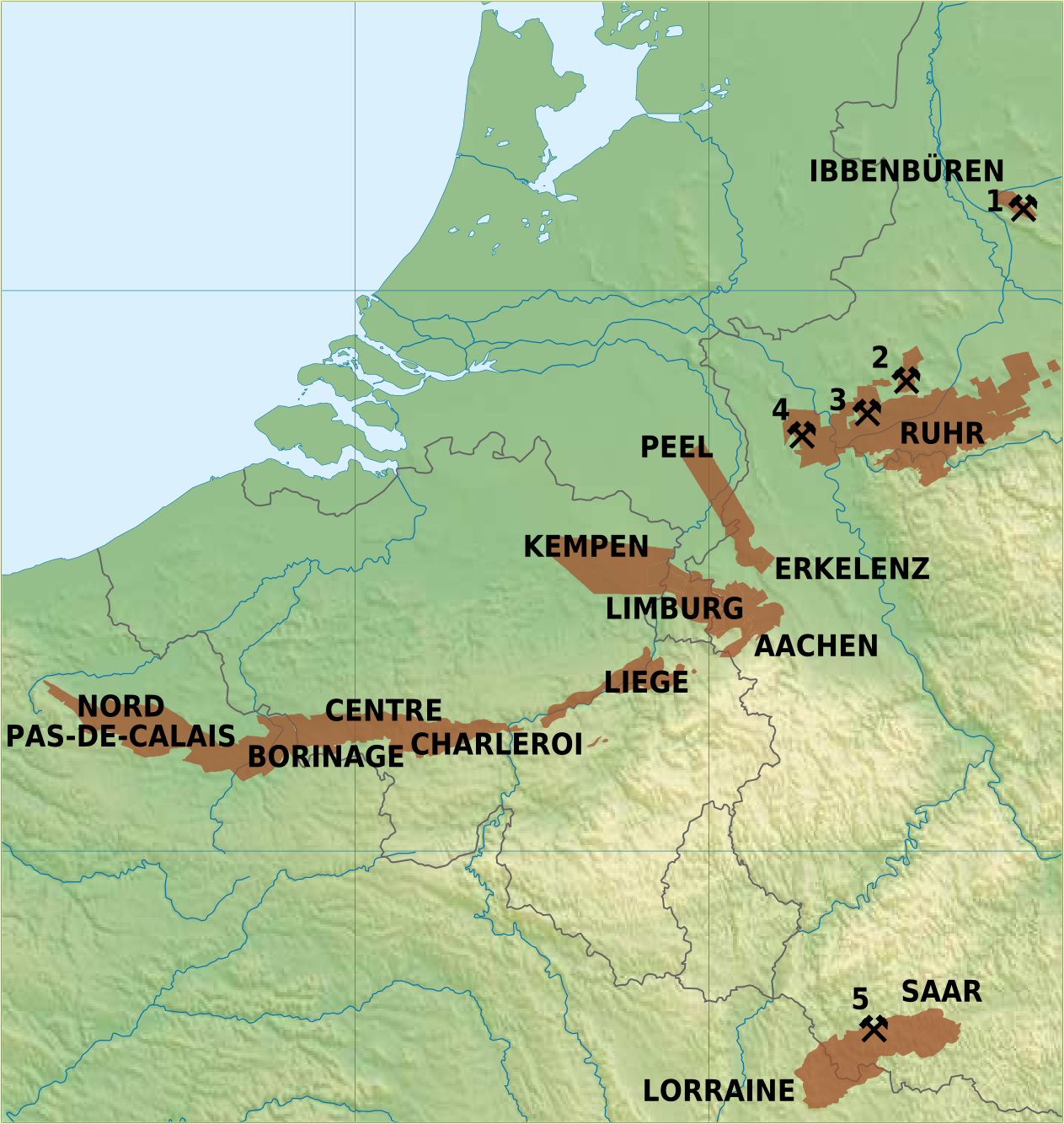
Historical coalfields of Western Germany, Belgium, the Netherlands and Northern France

The first important mines appeared in the 1750s, in the valleys of the rivers Ruhr, Inde and Wurm where coal seams outcropped and horizontal adit mining was possible. In 1782 the Krupp family began operations near Essen. After 1815 entrepreneurs in the Ruhr Area, which then became part of Prussia, took advantage of the tariff zone (Zollverein) to open new mines and associated iron smelters. New railroads were built by British engineers around 1850. Numerous small industrial centers sprang up, focused on ironworks, using local coal. The iron and steel works typically bought mines and erected coking ovens to supply their own requirements in coke and gas. These integrated coal-iron firms ("Huettenzechen") became numerous after 1854; after 1900 they became mixed firms called "Konzern".

The output of an average mine in 1850 was about 8,500 short tons; its employment about 64. By 1900, this output had risen to 280,000 and employment to about 1,400. Total Ruhr coal output rose from 2.0 million short tons in 1850 to 22 in 1880, 60 in 1900, and 114 in 1913, on the verge of war. In 1932 output was down to 73 million short tons, growing to 130 in 1940. Output peaked in 1957 (at 123 million), declining to 78 million short tons in 1974. By the end of 2010, only five coal mines were producing in Germany.

The miners in the Ruhr region were divided by ethnicity (Germans and Poles) and religion (Protestants and Catholics). Mobility in and out of the mining camps to nearby industrial areas was high. The miners split into several unions, with an affiliation to a political party. As a result, the socialist union (affiliated with the Social Democratic Party) competed with Catholic and Communist unions until 1933, when the Nazis took over all of them. After 1945 the socialists came to the fore.

=== Banks and cartels ===
German banks played central roles in financing German industry. Different banks formed cartels in different industries. Cartel contracts were accepted as legal and binding by German courts although they were held to be illegal in Britain and the United States.

The process of cartelization began slowly, but the cartel movement took hold after 1873 in the economic depression that followed the postunification speculative bubble. It began in heavy industry and spread throughout other industries. By 1900 there were 275 cartels in operation; by 1908, over 500. By some estimates, different cartel arrangements may have numbered in the thousands at different times, but many German companies stayed outside the cartels because they did not welcome the restrictions that membership imposed.

The government played a powerful role in the industrialization of the German Empire founded by Otto von Bismarck in 1871 during a period known as the Second Industrial Revolution. It supported not only heavy industry but also crafts and trades because it wanted to maintain prosperity in all parts of the empire. Even where the national government did not act, the highly autonomous regional and local governments supported their own industries. Each state tried to be as self-sufficient as possible. The beginning of rapid industrialization also gave rise to the period of "integration" in the form of foreign direct investment by German companies. One of the main justifications was the growing competition among local enterprises, especially in the newly emerging industries.

Despite the several ups and downs of prosperity and depression that marked the first decades of the German Empire, the ultimate wealth of the empire proved immense. German aristocrats, landowners, bankers, and producers created what might be termed the first German economic miracle, the turn-of-the-century surge in German industry and commerce during which bankers, industrialists, mercantilists, the military, and the monarchy joined forces.

=== Class and the welfare state ===
Germany's middle class, based in the cities, grew exponentially, but it never gained the political power it had in France, Britain or the United States. The Association of German Women's Organizations (BDF) was established in 1894 to encompass the proliferating women's organizations that had sprung up since the 1860s. From the beginning the BDF was a bourgeois organization, its members working toward equality with men in such areas as education, financial opportunities, and political life. Working-class women were not welcome; they were organized by the Socialists.

Bismarck built on a tradition of welfare programs in Prussia and Saxony that began as early as in the 1840s. In the 1880s he introduced old age pensions, accident insurance, medical care and unemployment insurance that formed the basis of the modern European welfare state. His paternalistic programs won the support of German industry because its goals were to win the support of the working classes for the Empire and reduce the outflow of immigrants to America, where wages were higher, but welfare did not exist. Bismarck further won the support of both industry and skilled workers by his high tariff policies, which protected profits and wages from American competition, although they alienated the liberal intellectuals who wanted free trade.

=== Railways ===
Political disunity of three dozen states and a pervasive conservatism made it difficult to build railways in the 1830s. However, by the 1840s, trunk lines did link the major cities; each German state was responsible for the lines within its own borders. Economist Friedrich List summed up the advantages to be derived from the development of the railway system in 1841:

- as a means of national defense, it facilitates the concentration, distribution and direction of the army.
- It is a means to the improvement of the culture of the nation. It brings talent, knowledge and skill of every kind readily to market.
- It secures the community against dearth and famine, and against excessive fluctuation in the prices of the necessaries of life.
- It promotes the spirit of the nation, as it has a tendency to destroy the Philistine spirit arising from isolation and provincial prejudice and vanity. It binds nations by ligaments, and promotes an interchange of food and of commodities, thus making it feel to be a unit. The iron rails become a nerve system, which, on the one hand, strengthens public opinion, and, on the other hand, strengthens the power of the state for police and governmental purposes.

Lacking a technological base at first, the Germans imported their engineering and hardware from Britain, but quickly learned the skills needed to operate and expand the railways. In many cities, the new railway shops were the centers of technological awareness and training, so that by 1850, Germany was self-sufficient in meeting the demands of railroad construction, and the railways were a major impetus for the growth of the new steel industry. Observers found that even as late as 1890, their engineering was inferior to Britain's. However, German unification in 1870 stimulated consolidation, nationalization into state-owned companies, and further rapid growth. Unlike the situation in France, the goal was support of industrialization, and so heavy lines crisscrossed the Ruhr and other industrial districts, and provided good connections to the major ports of Hamburg and Bremen. By 1880, Germany had 9,400 locomotives pulling 43,000 passengers and 30,000 tons of freight, and pulled ahead of France.

=== Agriculture ===
Perkins (1981) argues that more important than Bismarck's new tariff on imported grain was the introduction of the sugar beet as a primary crop. Farmers quickly abandoned traditional, inefficient practices for modern new methods, including use of new fertilizers and new tools. The knowledge and tools gained from the intensive farming of sugar and other root crops made Germany the most efficient agricultural producer in Europe by 1914. Even so, farms were small in size, and women did much of the field work. An unintended consequence was the increased dependence on migratory workers, especially from Germany's Polish districts.

=== Chemicals ===
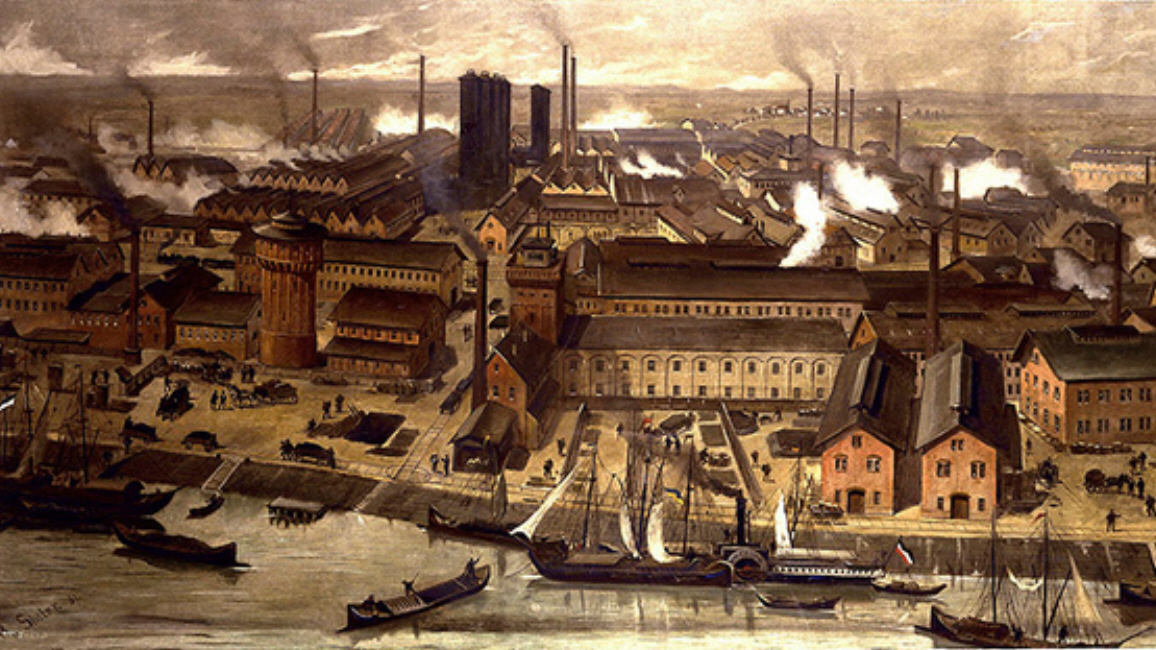
The BASF chemical factories in Ludwigshafen, Germany, 1881

The economy continued to industrialize and urbanize, with heavy industry (coal and steel especially) becoming important in the Ruhr, and manufacturing growing in the cities, the Ruhr, and Silesia. Based on its leadership in chemical research in the universities and industrial laboratories, Germany became dominant in the world's chemical industry in the late 19th century. Big businesses such as BASF and Bayer led the way in their production and distribution of artificial dyes and pharmaceuticals during the Wilhelmine era, leading to the German monopolization of the global chemicals market at 90 percent of the entire share of international volumes of trade in chemical products by 1914.

=== Steel ===
Germany became Europe's leading steel-producing country in the late-19th century, thanks in large part to the protection from American and British competition afforded by tariffs and to cartels. The leading firm was "Friedrich Krupp AG Hoesch-Krupp" run by the Krupp family. The "German Steel Federation" was established in 1874.

=== Foreign direct investment ===
The end of the 19th and the beginning of the 20th century are associated with the time of expansion in demand, the growth of the production capacity and the rise of exports to Germany. This in its turn stimulated the foreign direct investments (FDI) into the economics. Ten countries were considered the major investors, namely: Austria-Hungary, the UK, followed by France, USA, Italy, Russia, Poland (then part of neighboring empires), Switzerland, Netherlands, and Czechoslovakia (as a part of Austria-Hungary). Their aim was to gain access to raw material via FDI and to get involved in production and sales. The preferred methods of investments were via equity stakes, mergers and greenfield investments. In order to implement the destination analysis of the FDI during this time frame, the knowledge-capital model is mostly used due to the predominant role of horizontal investments (or market-driven FDI). Moreover, some evidence of the vertical investment structure was found (known as cost-driven FDI). To be more precise, when there were the wage differences between countries the FDI flows were higher to the low-wage ones. Major factors that influenced FDI were market environment (e.g. tariffs and market opening) and company size. Interestingly, cultural differences or distance between countries did not have major influence on FDI.

== Trade unions ==
Trade unions in Germany have a history reaching back to the German revolution in 1848, and still play an important role in the German economy and society. In 1875 the SPD, the Social Democratic Party of Germany, which is one of the biggest political parties in Germany, supported the forming of unions in Germany. However, according to John A. Moses, the German trade unions were not directly affiliated with the Social Democratic Party. The SPD leadership insisted on the primacy of politics, and refused to emphasize support for union goals and methods. The unions led by Carl Legien (1861–1920) developed their own nonpartisan political goals.

In the early 1930s, according to Gerard Braunthal, the three main trade unions (Allgemeiner Deutscher Gewerkschaftsbund, Allgemeiner freier Angestelltenbund, and Allgemeiner Deutscher Beamtenbund) failed to actively oppose Hitler in 1932–33. They minimized the threat in 1932 and opposed a general strike because it might spark a civil war. As the Nazis took power in 1933, the high unemployment had demoralized workers. Their historic faith in socialism gave way to a wave of nationalism. The leaders did not foresee how the Nazis would completely unseat them and suppress labor's aspirations.

The most important labour organisation is the German Confederation of Trade Unions (Deutscher Gewerkschaftsbund – DGB), which represents more than 6 million people (31 December 2011) and is the umbrella association of several single trade unions for special economic sectors. The DGB is not the only Union Organization that represents the working trade. There are smaller organizations, such as the CGB, which is a Christian-based confederation, that represent over 1.5 million people.

== Early 20th century ==
The merger of four major firms into the Vereinigte Stahlwerke (United Steel Works) in 1926 was modeled on the U.S. Steel corporation in the U.S. The goal was to move beyond the limitations of the old cartel system by incorporating advances simultaneously inside a single corporation. The new company emphasized rationalization of management structures and modernization of the technology; it employed a multi-divisional structure and used return on investment as its measure of success.

Whereas Britain's share of world trade had declined between 1880 and 1913 from 38.2 percent to 30.2 percent, Germany's share had increased in the same period from 17.2 percent to 26.6 percent. Between 1890 and 1913 German exports tripled and by 1913 Germany's share of world manufacturing production was 14.8 percent, ahead of Britain's 13.6 percent. By 1913 American and German exports dominated the world steel market, as Britain slipped to third place. In 1914 German steel output was 17.6 million tons, larger than the combined output of Britain, France and Russia. Germany's coal production reached 277 million tons in 1914, not far behind Britain's 292 million tons and far ahead of Austria-Hungary's 47 million tons, France's 40 million tons and Russia's 36 million tons.

In machinery, iron and steel and other industries, German firms avoided cut-throat competition and instead relied on trade associations. Germany was a world leader because of its prevailing "corporatist mentality", its strong bureaucratic tradition, and the encouragement of the government. These associations regulated competition and allowed small firms to function in the shadow of much larger companies.

=== World War I ===
Unexpectedly Germany plunged into World War I (1914–1918). It rapidly mobilized its civilian economy for the war effort. The economy suffered under the British blockade, which cut off supplies. The impact of the blockade was gradual, with relatively little impact on German industry in the first couple of years. Mobilization and armament caused a short-lived but dramatic economic shock at the beginning of the conflict: unemployment spiked from 2.7% in July 1914 to 22.7% in September. The unemployment level thereafter fell dramatically, as war industry and recruitment placed a massive demand on manpower. Intervention by the government in the economy was also moderate at the beginning, because the war was anticipated to be brief. Securing materials for armaments production and the control of food markets were two areas where the German government was involved from the start of the conflict. Private corporations were created under the supervision of the government to oversee specified industries and manage the supply and distribution of foodstuffs. This began in November 1914 with the establishment of a wheat corporation. There were around 200 of these corporations by the end of the war, representing an unprecedented level of cooperation between government and the private sector.

The insatiable demands on manpower led to yet more government intervention and triggered a massive redistribution of the workforce from "peacetime" industries to war industries and the military. High levels of conscription into the army threatened to deprive the armaments industry of workers, with the result that by 1916 the German government began exempting large numbers of otherwise eligible men from military service so they could remain as workers. Overall this balance between conscription and industry was handled efficiently, with Germany's industrial workforce shrinking by only 10%. About 1.2 million men were exempted in 1916, 740,000 of whom were fit to serve; by 1918 2.2 million men had been exempted from service, 1.3 million of whom were fit to serve. There was an exodus of workers from "peacetime" industries and agriculture into the better-paid war industries, which claimed 45% of the work force by 1918. The result was that "peacetime" industry declined by about 43% over the course of the war, claiming only 20% of the workforce by 1918.

Germany exploited its own natural resources and those of its occupied territories to fill the import gap caused by the British blockade, while neutral neighbors like the Netherlands and the Scandinavian nations exported crucial foodstuffs like wheat to keep the German population fed. There were some commodities, like rubber, cotton, and nitrates (Saltpeter), which Germany could not easily substitute from within, and which it could not obtain from its neutral trading partners because the Allies classified them as contraband. The loss of nitrate imports, vital for the production of both explosives and fertilizers, proved disastrous for German agriculture. German chemical firms turned to producing synthetic nitrates, but output was only high enough to sustain the explosives industry. Without fertilizer, agricultural productivity declined dramatically. The freezing 'Turnip Winter' of 1916-17 only compounded the growing subsistence problem; wheat and potato crops failed and Germans had to turn to turnips to satisfy their nutritional needs, a vegetable previously used for livestock feed.

The cumulative impact of the First World War on the German economy was disastrous. The German economy shrank by approximately one-third during the war, with overall industrial production down by 40% compared to pre-war levels.

=== Weimar Republic ===
British economist John Maynard Keynes denounced the 1919 Treaty of Versailles as ruinous to German and global prosperity. In his book The Economic Consequences of the Peace, Keynes said the treaty was a "Carthaginian peace", a misguided attempt to destroy Germany on behalf of French revanchism, rather than to follow the fairer principles for a lasting peace set out in President Woodrow Wilson's Fourteen Points, which Germany had accepted at the armistice. Keynes argued the sums being asked of Germany in reparations were many times more than it was possible for Germany to pay, and that these would produce drastic instability. French economist Étienne Mantoux disputed that analysis in The Carthaginian Peace, or the Economic Consequences of Mr. Keynes (1946). More recently economists have argued that the restriction of Germany to a small army in the 1920s saved it so much money it could afford the reparations payments.

In reality, the total German Reparation payments actually made were far smaller than anyone expected. The total came to 20 billion German gold marks, worth about $5 billion US dollars or £1 billion British pounds. German reparations payments ended in 1931.

The war and the treaty were followed by the hyper-inflation of the early 1920s that wreaked havoc on Germany's social structure and political stability. During that inflation, the value of the nation's currency, the Papiermark, collapsed from 8.9 per US$1 in 1918 to 4.2 trillion per US$1 by November 1923.

Prosperity reigned 1923–29, supported by large bank loans from New York. By 1929 GDP per capita was 12 per cent higher than in 1913 and between 1924 and 1929 exports doubled. Net investment reached a high average figure of nearly 12 per cent. However, unemployment was over two million by the winter of 1928–29.

The Great Depression struck Germany hard, starting already in the last months of 1927. Foreign lending, especially by New York banks, ceased around 1930. Unemployment soared, especially in larger cities, fueling extremism and violence on the far right and far left, as the center of the political spectrum weakened. Capital flows finally reversed in 1931 and a currency crisis ensued. At the same time Germany was hit by a banking crisis, when the second largest German bank, the Danat-Bank, failed. At the peak of the crisis the United States, with the Hoover Moratorium, gained the support of 15 nations for a one-year moratorium on all reparations and war debts. Germany had paid about one-eighth of its war reparations when they were suspended in 1932 by the Lausanne Conference of 1932. The failure of major banks in Germany and Austria in 1931 worsened the worldwide banking crisis.

Germany was among the countries most severely affected by the Great Depression because its recovery and rationalization of major industries was financed by unsustainable foreign lending. War reparation obligations reduced investment propensity and, perhaps most importantly, the government implemented a rigid austerity policy (motivated partially out of a common concern at the time that devaluation would lead to inflation) that resulted in deflation. While this policy likely only aggravated Germany's economic crisis by a limited degree, its means of implementation created discontent amongst the German populace and resulted in increased political radicalisation. Capital flows also contributed significantly to the crisis.

As unemployment reached very high levels, the National Socialists accumulated government power and began to pursue their policies against the Jewish minority, political leftists and many other groups. After being elected, the National Socialists undertook a series of rapid steps to abolish democracy. Their trade policy in Germany consisted of an autarkic policy regime that aimed to cancel all imports, such as foodstuffs, that could be replaced with domestic substitutes or raw materials for the consumer-oriented industries. Only imports of iron ore and similar items were considered necessary because a main aim of the government was to strengthen the production capacity of military products. Both the persecuted and non-persecuted German groups suffered from these autarkic and trade-restraining policies.

== Nazi economy ==
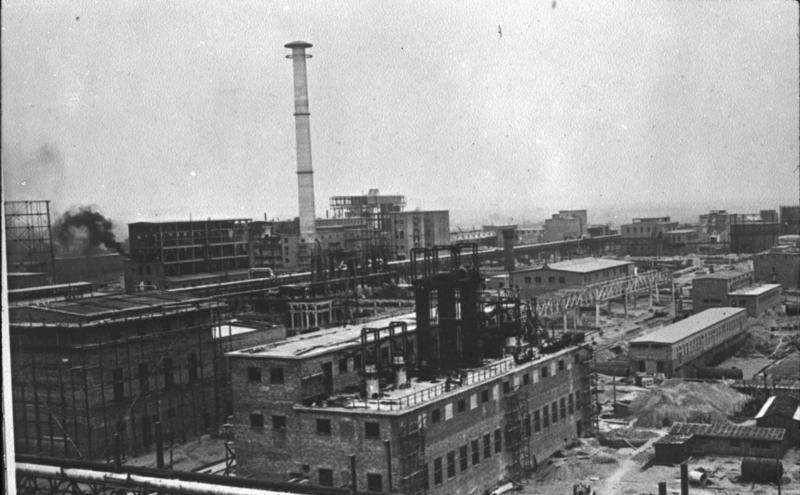
IG Farben factory in Monowitz (near Auschwitz), 1941

During the Hitler era (1933–45), the economy developed a hothouse prosperity, supported with high government subsidies to those sectors that tended to give Germany military power and economic autarky, that is, economic independence from the global economy. During the war itself the German economy was sustained by the exploitation of conquered territories and people. "The economic recovery in the Third Reich, as measured by GDP, is well documented; real GDP grew by some 55% between 1933 and 1937."

US Air Force photograph of the destruction in central Berlin in July 1945

Physical capital in the occupied territories was destroyed by the war, insufficient reinvestment and maintenance, whereas the industrial capacity of Germany increased substantially until the end of the war despite heavy bombing. (However, much of this capacity was useless after the war because it specialized in armament production.)

With the loss of the war, the country entered into the period known as Stunde Null ("Zero Hour"), when Germany lay in ruins and society had to be rebuilt from scratch.

== Post-World War II ==
The first several years after World War II were years of bitter penury for the Germans. Seven million forced laborers left for their own land, but about 14 million Germans came in from the East, living for years. It took nearly a decade for all the German POWs to return. In the West, farm production fell, food supplies were cut off from eastern Germany (controlled by the Soviets) and food shipments extorted from conquered lands ended. The standard of living fell to levels not seen in a century, and food was always in short supply. High inflation made savings (and debts) lose 99% of their value, while the black market distorted the economy.

Even while the Marshall Plan was being implemented, the dismantling of ostensibly German industry continued; and in 1949 Konrad Adenauer, an opponent to Hitler's regime and the head of the Christian Democratic Union, wrote to the Allies requesting the end of industrial dismantling, citing the inherent contradiction between encouraging industrial growth and removing factories, and also the unpopularity of the policy. Support for dismantling was by this time coming predominantly from the French, and the Petersberg Agreement of November 1949 greatly reduced the levels of deindustrialization, though dismantling of minor factories continued until 1951. The first "level of industry" plan, signed by the Allies on March 29, 1946, had stated that German heavy industry was to be lowered to 50% of its 1938 levels via the destruction of 1,500 listed manufacturing plants. The Marshall Plan played a huge role in post-war recovery for Europe in general. In 1948, conditions were improving, and European workers' earnings exceeded earnings on the west side by 20 percent. Thanks to the Plan, industrial and agricultural production increased by 35 percent during 1952.

In January 1946 the Allied Control Council set the foundation of the future German economy by putting a cap on German steel production. The maximum allowed was set at about 5,800,000 tons of steel a year, equivalent to 25% of the pre-war production level. The UK, in whose occupation zone most of the steel production was located, had argued for a more limited capacity reduction by placing the production ceiling at 12 million tons of steel per year, but had to submit to the will of the US, France and the Soviet Union (which had argued for a 3 million ton limit). Steel plants thus made redundant were to be dismantled. Germany was to be reduced to the standard of life it had known at the height of the Great Depression (1932). Consequently, car production was set to 10% of pre-war levels, and the manufacture of other commodities was reduced as well.

The first "German level of industry" plan was subsequently followed by a number of new ones, the last signed in 1949. By 1950, after the virtual completion of the by then much watered-down "level of industry" plans, equipment had been removed from 706 manufacturing plants in western Germany and steel production capacity had been reduced by 6,700,000 tons. Vladimir Petrov concludes that the Allies "delayed by several years the economic reconstruction of the war-torn continent, a reconstruction which subsequently cost the United States billions of dollars." In 1951 West Germany agreed to join the European Coal and Steel Community (ECSC) the following year. This meant that some of the economic restrictions on production capacity and on actual production that were imposed by the International Authority for the Ruhr were lifted, and that its role was taken over by the ECSC.

Economist Ludwig Erhard, was determined to shape a new and different kind of German economy. He was given the opportunity by American officials, who saw that many of his ideas coincided with their own. Erhard abolished the Reichsmark and then created a new currency, the Deutsche Mark, on June 21, 1948, with the concurrence of the Western Allies but also taking advantage of the opportunity to abolish most Nazi and occupation rules and regulations. It established the foundations of the West German economy and of the West German state.

=== Marshall Plan and productivity ===
The Marshall Plan was implemented in West Germany from 1948 to 1950 as a way to modernize business procedures and utilize the best practices. The Marshall Plan made it possible for West Germany to return quickly to its traditional pattern of industrial production with a strong export sector. Without the plan, agriculture would have played a larger role in the recovery period, which itself would have been longer.

The use of the American model had begun in the 1920s. After 1950, Germany overtook Britain in comparative productivity levels for the whole economy, primarily as a result of trends in services rather than trends in industry. Britain's historic lead in productivity of its services sector was based on external economies of scale in a highly urbanized economy with an international colonial orientation. On the other hand, the low productivity in Germany was caused by the underdevelopment of services generally, especially in rural areas that comprised a much larger sector. As German farm employment declined sharply after 1950 thanks to mechanization, catching-up occurred in services. This process was aided by a sharp increase in human and physical capital accumulation, a pro-growth government policy, and the effective utilization of the education sector to create a more productive work force.

== Social market economy ==
The German economy self-defines as a soziale Marktwirtschaft, or "social market economy". The designation emphasizes that the system as it developed in Weimar days and after 1945 has both a material and a social—or human—dimension stressing freedom with responsibility. The term "market" is of significance, as free enterprise is considered to be the main driving force for a healthy economy. The state was to play only a minor role in the new West German economy, such as the protection of the competitive environment from monopolistic or oligopolistic tendencies—including its own. The term "social" is stressed because West Germans wanted an economy that would not only help the wealthy but also care for the workers and others who might not prove able to cope with the strenuous competitive demands of a market economy. The term "social" was chosen rather than "socialist" to distinguish the West German system from those in which the state claimed the right to direct the economy or to intervene in it.

Beyond these principles of the social market economy, but linked to it, comes a more traditional German concept, that of Ordnung, which can be directly translated to mean "order" but which really means an economy, society, and policy that are structured but not dictatorial. The founders of the social market economy insisted that Denken in Ordnungen—to think in terms of systems of order—was essential. They also spoke of Ordoliberalism, because the essence of the concept is that this must be a freely chosen order, not a command order.

In management, the widespread Harzburg Model practices, starting in the 1950s, featured in West German commercial activity.

Over time, the term "social" in the social market economy began to take on a life of its own. It moved the West German economy toward an extensive social-welfare system that has become one of the most expensive in the world. Moreover, the West German federal government and the states (Länder; singular, Land) began to compensate for irregularities in economic cycles and for shifts in world production by beginning to shelter and support some sectors and industries. In an even greater departure from the Erhard tradition, the government became an instrument for the preservation of existing industries rather than a force for renewal. In the 1970s, the state assumed an ever more important role in the economy. During the 1980s, Chancellor Helmut Kohl tried to reduce that state role, and he succeeded in part, but from 1989 German reunification again compelled the German government to assume a stronger role in the economy. Thus, the contradiction between the terms "social" and "market" has remained an element for debate in Germany.

Given the internal contradiction in its philosophy, the German economy is both conservative and dynamic. It is conservative in the sense that it draws on the part of the German tradition that envisages some state role in the economy and a cautious attitude toward investment and risk-taking. It is dynamic in the sense that it is directed toward growth—even if that growth may be slow and steady rather than spectacular. It tries to combine the virtues of a market system with the virtues of a social-welfare system.

== Economic miracle and beyond ==
The economic reforms and the new West German system received powerful support from a number of sources: investment funds under the European Recovery Programme, more commonly known as the Marshall Plan; the stimulus to German industry provided by the diversion of other Western resources for Korean War production; and the German readiness to work hard for low wages until productivity had risen. But the essential component of success was the revival of confidence brought on by Erhard's reforms and by the new currency.

The West German boom that began in 1950 was truly memorable. The growth rate of industrial production was 25.0 percent in 1950 and 18.1 percent in 1951. Growth continued at a high rate for most of the 1950s, despite occasional slowdowns. By 1960 industrial production had risen to two-and-one-half times the level of 1950 and far beyond any that the Nazis had reached during the 1930s in all of Germany. GDP rose by two-thirds during the same decade. The number of persons employed rose from 13.8 million in 1950 to 19.8 million in 1960, and the unemployment rate fell from 10.3 percent to 1.2 percent.

Labor also benefited in due course from the boom. Although wage demands and pay increases had been modest at first, wages and salaries rose over 80 percent between 1949 and 1955, catching up with growth. West German social programmes were given a considerable boost in 1957, just before a national election, when the government decided to initiate a number of social programmes and to expand others.

In 1957 West Germany gained a new central bank, the Deutsche Bundesbank, generally called simply the Bundesbank, which succeeded the Bank deutscher Länder and was given much more authority over monetary policy. That year also saw the establishment of the Bundeskartellamt (Federal Cartel Office), designed to prevent the return of German monopolies and cartels. Six years later, in 1963, the Bundestag, the lower house of Germany's parliament, at Erhard's urging established the Council of Economic Experts to provide objective evaluations on which to base German economic policy.

The West German economy did not grow as fast or as consistently in the 1960s as it had during the 1950s, in part because such a torrid pace could not be sustained, in part because the supply of fresh labour from East Germany was cut off by the Berlin Wall, built in 1961, and in part because the Bundesbank became disturbed about potential overheating and moved several times to slow the pace of growth. At the beginning of 1966, the West German government submitted a budget with a strong reduction in government expenses. In the months that followed, both Karl Blessing, the president of the Bundesbank and Erhard, the chancellor, called for a cooling off of the economy in fear of inflation. By mid-1966, the joint efforts worked, and the economy started to slow down. Erhard, who had succeeded Konrad Adenauer as chancellor, was voted out of office in December 1966, largely—although not entirely—because of the economic problems of the Federal Republic. He was replaced by the Grand Coalition consisting of the Christian Democratic Union (Christlich Demokratische Union—CDU), its sister party the Christian Social Union (Christlich-Soziale Union—CSU), and the Social Democratic Party of Germany (Sozialdemokratische Partei Deutschlands—SPD) under Chancellor Kurt Georg Kiesinger of the CDU.

Under the pressure of the slowdown, the new West German Grand Coalition government abandoned Erhard's broad laissez-faire orientation. The new minister for economics, Karl Schiller, argued strongly for legislation that would give the federal government and his ministry greater authority to guide economic policy. In 1967 the Bundestag passed the Law for Promoting Stability and Growth, known as the Magna Carta of medium-term economic management. That law, which remains in effect although never again applied as energetically as in Schiller's time, provided for coordination of federal, Land, and local budget plans in order to give fiscal policy a stronger impact. The law also set a number of optimistic targets for the four basic standards by which West German economic success was henceforth to be measured: currency stability, economic growth, employment levels, and trade balance. Those standards became popularly known as the magisches Viereck, the "magic rectangle" or the "magic polygon".

Schiller followed a different concept from Erhard's. He was one of the rare German Keynesians, and he brought to his new tasks the unshakable conviction that government had both the obligation and the capacity to shape economic trends and to smooth out and even eliminate the business cycle. Schiller's chosen formula was Globalsteuerung, or global guidance, a process by which government would not intervene in the details of the economy but would establish broad guidelines that would foster uninterrupted noninflationary growth.

Schiller's success in the Grand Coalition helped to give the SPD an electoral victory in 1969 and a chance to form a new coalition government with the Free Democratic Party (Freie Demokratische Partei—FDP) under Willy Brandt. The SPD-FDP coalition expanded the West German social security system, substantially increasing the size and cost of the social budget. Social programme costs grew by over 10 percent a year during much of the 1970s, introducing into the budget an unalterable obligation that reduced fiscal flexibility (although Schiller and other Keynesians believed that it would have an anticyclical effect). This came back to haunt Schiller as well as every German government since then. Schiller himself had to resign in 1972 when the West German and global economies were in a downturn and when all his ideas did not seem able to revive West German prosperity. Willy Brandt himself resigned two years later.

Helmut Schmidt, Brandt's successor, was intensely interested in economics but also faced great problems, including the dramatic upsurge in oil prices of 1973-74. West Germany's GDP in 1975 fell by 1.4 percent (in constant prices), the first time since the founding of the FRG that it had fallen so sharply. The West German trade balance also fell as global demand declined and as the terms of trade deteriorated because of the rise in petroleum prices.

By 1976 the worst was over. West German growth resumed, and the inflation rate began to decline. Although neither reached the favourable levels that had come to be taken for granted during the 1950s and early 1960s, they were accepted as tolerable after the turbulence of the previous years. Schmidt began to be known as a Macher (achiever), and the government won reelection in 1976. Schmidt's success led him and his party to claim that they had built Modell Deutschland (the German model).

But the economy again turned down and, despite efforts to stimulate growth by government deficits, failed to revive quickly. It was only by mid-1978 that Schmidt and the Bundesbank were able to bring the economy into balance. After that, the economy continued expanding through 1979 and much of 1980, helping Schmidt win reelection in 1980. But the upturn proved to be uneven and unrewarding, as the problems of the mid-1970s rapidly returned. By early 1981, Schmidt faced the worst possible situation: growth fell and unemployment rose, but inflation did not abate.

By late 1982, Schmidt's coalition government collapsed as the FDP withdrew to join a coalition led by Helmut Kohl, the leader of the CDU/CSU. He began to direct what was termed the Wende (West Germany) (turning or reversal). The government proceeded to implement new policies to reduce the government role in the economy and within a year won a popular vote in support of the new course.

Within its broad policy, the new government had several main objectives: to reduce the federal deficit by cutting expenditures as well as taxes, to reduce government restrictions and regulations, and to improve the flexibility and performance of the labour market. The government also carried through a series of privatisation measures, selling almost DM10 billion (for the value of the Deutsche Mark—see Glossary) in shares of such diverse state-owned institutions as VEBA, VIAG, Volkswagen, Lufthansa, and Salzgitter. Through all these steps, the state role in the West German economy declined from 52 percent to 46 percent of GDP between 1982 and 1990, according to Bundesbank statistics.

Although the policies of the Wende changed the mood of the West German economy and reinstalled a measure of confidence, progress came unevenly and haltingly. During most of the 1980s, the figures on growth and inflation improved but slowly, and the figures on unemployment barely moved at all. There was little job growth until the end of the decade. When the statistics did change, however, even modestly, it was at least in the right direction.

Nonetheless, it also remained true that West German growth did not again reach the levels that it had attained in the early years of the Federal Republic. There had been a decline in the growth rate since the 1950s, an upturn in unemployment since the 1960s, and a gradual increase in inflation except during or after a severe downturn.

Global economic statistics also showed a decline in West German output and vitality. They showed that the West German share of total world production had grown from 6.6 percent in 1965 to 7.9 percent by 1975. Twelve years later, in 1987, however, it had fallen to 7.4 percent, largely because of the more rapid growth of Japan and other Asian states. Even adding the estimated GDP of the former East Germany at its peak before unification would not have brought the all-German share above 8.2 percent by 1989 and would have left all of Germany with barely a greater share of world production than West Germany alone had reached fifteen years earlier.

It was only in the late 1980s that West Germany's economy finally began to grow more rapidly. The growth rate for West German GDP rose to 3.7 percent in 1988 and 3.6 percent in 1989, the highest levels of the decade. The unemployment rate also fell to 7.6 percent in 1989, despite an influx of workers from abroad. Thus, the results of the late 1980s appeared to vindicate the West German supply-side revolution. Tax rate reductions had led to greater vitality and revenues. Although the cumulative public-sector deficit had gone above the DM1 trillion level, the public sector was growing more slowly than before.

The year 1989 was the last year of the West German economy as a separate and separable institution. From 1990 the positive and negative distortions generated by German reunification set in, and the West German economy began to reorient itself toward economic and political union with what had been East Germany. The economy turned gradually and massively from its primarily West European and global orientation toward an increasingly intense concentration on the requirements and the opportunities of unification.

== German reunification and its aftermath ==
Germany invested over 2 trillion marks in the rehabilitation of the former East Germany, helping it to transition to a market economy and cleaning up the environmental degradation. By 2011 the results were mixed, with slow economic development in the East, in sharp contrast to the rapid economic growth in both western and southern Germany. Unemployment was much higher in the East, often over 15%. Economists Snower and Merkl (2006) suggest that the malaise was prolonged by all the social and economic help from the German government, pointing especially to bargaining by proxy, high unemployment benefits and welfare entitlements, and generous job-security provisions.

== 21st century ==
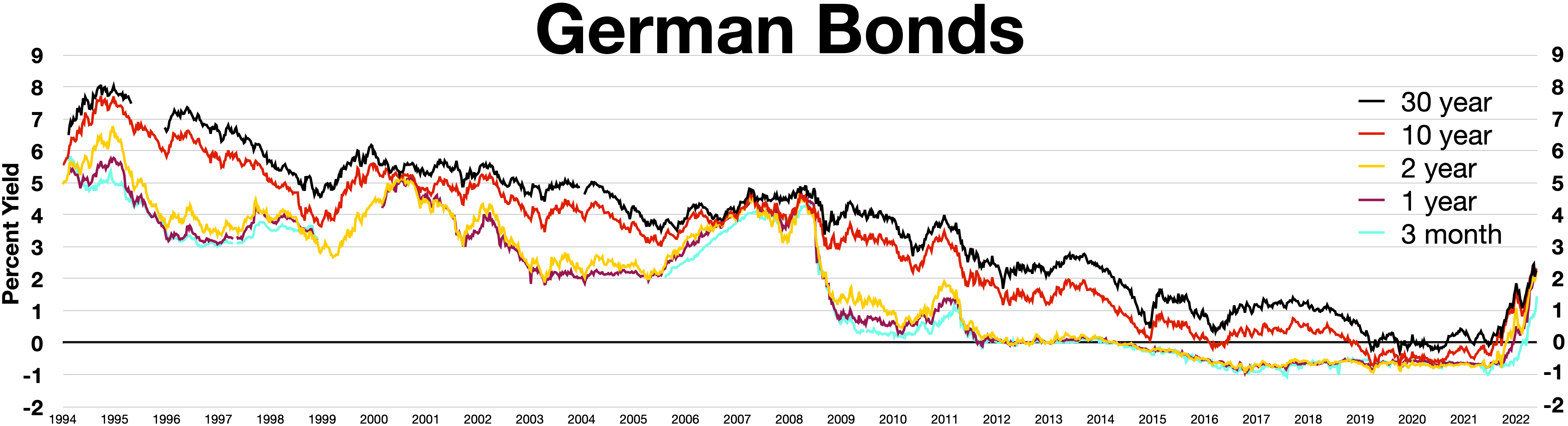
German bonds Inverted yield curve in 2008 and Negative interest rates 2014–2022 30 year 10 year 2 year 1 year 3 month

The German economic miracle petered out in the 1990s, so that by the end of the century and the early 2000s it was ridiculed as "the sick man of Europe". It suffered a short recession in 2003. The economic growth rate was a very low 1.2% annually from 1988 to 2005. Unemployment, especially in the eastern districts, remained stubbornly high despite heavy stimulus spending. It rose from 9.2% in 1998 to 11.1% in 2009. The worldwide Great Recession of 2008-2010 worsened conditions briefly, as there was a sharp decline in GDP. However unemployment did not rise, and recovery was faster than almost anywhere else. The old industrial centers of the Rhineland and North Germany lagged as well, as the coal and steel industries faded in importance. The economic policies were heavily oriented toward the world market, and the export sector continued to be very strong. Prosperity was pulled along by exports that reached a record of $1.7 trillion US dollars in 2011, or half of the German GDP, or nearly 8% of all of the exports in the world. While the rest of the European Community struggled with financial issues, Germany took a conservative position based on an extraordinarily strong economy after 2010. The labor market proved flexible, and the export industries were attuned to world demand.

In 2011 it remained the third largest exporter and third largest importer. Most of the country's exports are in engineering, especially machinery, automobiles, chemical goods and metals. Germany is a leading producer of wind turbines and solar-power technology. Annual trade fairs and congresses are held in cities throughout Germany. 2011 was a record-breaking year for the German economy. German companies exported goods worth over €1 trillion ($1.3 trillion), the highest figure in history. The number of people in work rose to 41.6 million, the highest recorded figure.

Through 2012, Germany's economy continued to be stronger relative to local neighbouring nations. Germany had historically relied on cheap Russian gas for improving the competitiveness of its energy-intensive industrial sectors such as chemicals, steel, and automotives. Since 2022, due to the international sanctions against the Russian invasion of Ukraine, Germany has cut back on its gas imports from Russia, and consequently energy costs have risen and increased production expenses, contributing to profit reductions and lower competitiveness in these traditional sectors. At the time of the invasion, Russia supplied around 55% of Germany's natural gas imports. Amid a global energy crisis, Chancellor Olaf Scholz committed to weaken dependence on Russian energy imports by halting certification of Nord Stream 2, while also committing to his long-term predecessor Angela Merkel's policy of phasing out nuclear energy. Germany completed its nuclear phase-out in April 2023. The transition however placed additional pressure on the country's energy system.

In the fourth quarter of 2023, Germany's GDP surpassed Japan's, and is now the third largest economy in the world after the United States and China. Germany is the largest economy in Europe and is the third largest export nation in the world.

== Historical evolution of German GDP ==
GDP PPP (in millions of 1990 Int$ dollars) comparison involving the area of West Germany, East Germany, Modern Germany and the former German Reich from 1820 to 1991
	West Germany within 1990 frontiers	East Germany within 1990 frontiers	Germany within 1991 frontiers	Germany within 1936 frontiers	Germany within 1913 frontiers (Note: Based on 1913 frontiers but excluding Reichsland Alsace-Lorraine. In 1870-71, the German annexation of Alsace-Lorraine had added four percent to both its population and GDP.)
1820	16,390				26,819
1870	44,094				72,149
1913	145,045			225,008	237,332
1936	192,910	74,652	267,572	299,753	
1950	213,942	51,412	265,354		
1973	814,786	129,969	944,755		
1990	1,182,261	82,177	1,264,438		
1991	1,242,096	85,961	1,328,057		

== See also ==
- History of Germany
