= Kardorff =

Kardorff is a German surname and a German noble family. Notable people with the surname include:

- Wilhelm von Kardorff (1828–1907), German landowner and politician who supported the Free Conservative Party
- Siegfried von Kardorff (1873−1945), German politician
