= German Agrarian League =

Agricultural advocacy group (1893–1921)

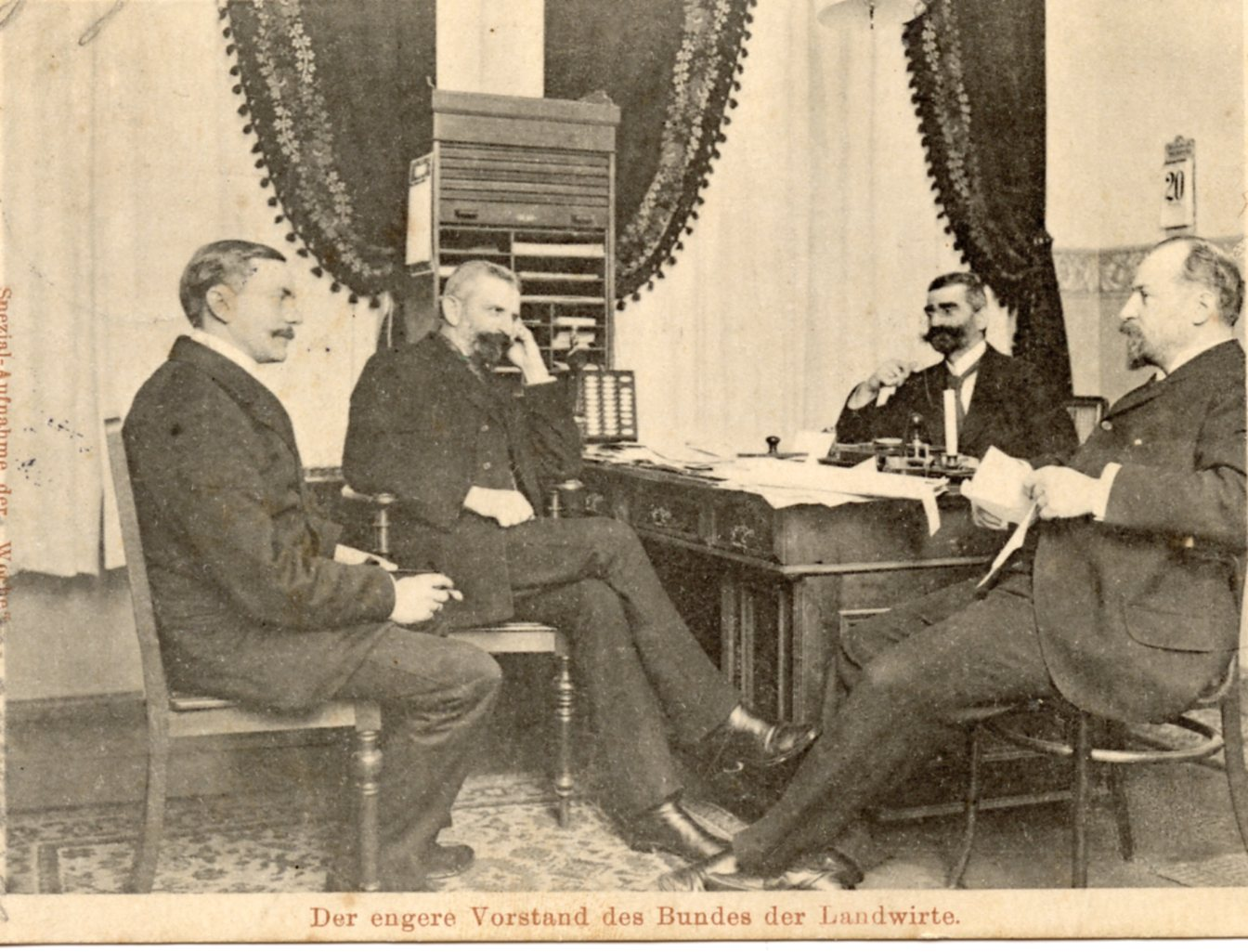
The Executive Committee of the Bund der Landwirte in 1900, on the left Dr. Diederich Hahn, center Conrad Baron von Wangenheim, and to the right Gustav Roesicke

The Bund der Landwirte (Agrarian League) (BDL) was a German advocacy group founded 18 February 1893 by farmers and agricultural interests in response to the farm crisis of the 1890s, and more specifically the result of the protests against the low-tariff policies of Chancellor Leo von Caprivi, including his free trade policies.

According to James C Hunt, the Agrarian League was launched to protest the reduction in tariffs against imported grains; The old tariffs were designed to keep prices high for the farmers; this kept food prices high for urban consumers. The new tariffs were designed to lower the cost of food to consumers, and open up new business opportunities for German exporters. The League was organized nationally like a political party, with local chapters, centralized discipline, and a clear-cut platform. It fought against free trade, industrialization, and liberalism. Its most hated enemy was socialism, which it blamed on Jewish financial capitalism. The League helped establish grassroots anti-Semitism of the sort that flourished into the 1930s.

== Background ==
The Reichstag was dissolved in June 1878 because it refused Bismarck's Anti-Socialist Law. Chancellor Bismarck in the newly elected parliament relied on a broad agro-conservative majority with the slogan: Agriculture is owed by the state the same attention as industry; if both do not go hand in hand, the strength of one will not suffice for a lack in the other. Bismarck helped foster support from these conservatives by enacting several tariffs protecting German agriculture, and incidentally industry, from foreign competition.

In the early 1880s agriculture employed more people than industry and trade combined. However, Germany was fast becoming an industrialized state with increased rural exodus to the cities. After Bismarck resigned in 1890 and Leo von Caprivi became chancellor, the demands of industry were much more compelling, and the free trade treaties with Russia and Austria as well as legislation favorable to industry was seen as a threat to agriculture.

The inaugural meeting of the Bund der Landwirte was held in the Berlin Tivoli Brewery and was attended by some ten thousand people. It drew its support from the most Protestant areas of the empire, northern and central Germany, and particularly from Prussia. In May 1893, just three months after its establishment, it campaigned for farmers' rights and won over 140 of the deputies who were elected in July, or about one-third of the members of the Reichstag, including the influential group that would found the Economic Association (Wirtschaftliche Vereinigung) some years later with Wilhelm von Kardorff, Berthold von Ploetz and Diederich Hahn.

== Organisation ==
By the end of 1893 the BDL had over 200,000 members. Only about 1% were rural landlords, with 24% coming from large family-owned farms, and the rest being small plot and tenant farmers. However, the leadership were from that 1%, primarily the Junkers from the east Elbe region, Saxony and Pommerania. Exemplifying this control was Conrad Freiherr (Baron) von Wangenheim, a Pommeranian with extensive estates, who was chairman from 1898 to 1920. Thus the organisation favored the landlord interests as well as playing up to the interests of the actual farmers. Both the landlords and the farmers felt the shifting of political and economic power away from the land, and desired to maintain their vested interests. As a result, they worked closely with the political parties most aligned with that interest, but most especially with the Conservative Party (DKP).

By 1897 the BDL was headed by a three-member Executive Committee, one of whom was the chairman. It had a number of divisions, a speakers bureau which sent out inspirational speakers to the farming villages in the less labour-intensive winter months, an electoral division to identify candidates to support and to lobby candidates into supporting BDL initiatives, during election run-ups they had a propaganda division that provided BDL viewpoints on the candidates. There was a separate lobbying division for elected members of the Reichstag. In addition the organisation provided things like purchasing cooperatives which offered economic benefits to the members and acted as incentives to retain membership. By 1913 the BDL had over 330,000 members, employed more than 350 staff at headquarters, and approximately 400 regional workers.

== Policies and goals ==
The goal of the BDL was to preserve the leading position of agriculture in the economy and politics of Germany. In one of the founding documents it says: "German agriculture is the primary and most important industry, the strongest support of the empire and of the several states. To protect and strengthen agriculture is our first and most serious task because by the blossoming and flourishing of agriculture, the welfare of all professions is secured." But the BDL also came to the defense of the mom and pop shops as against big-city department store chains, they safeguarded the interests of the rural and small urban middle class, the shop assistants, rural workers, sailors and fishermen and small wine growers. Basically they took all non-industrial workers, and small businesses under their wing.

The most major demand of the BDL was the restoration of protective tariffs on food stuffs. Other major demands were:

- the introduction of a state monopoly on foreign grain cereal with guaranteed minimum prices for domestically produced cereals.
- the introduction of a dual currency. In addition to the gold and silver, bank notes should be reinstated. It was hoped that the associated inflationary effects would help relieve the burden on rural borrowers.
- stock market reform - specifically to abolish grain futures trading and the Commodity Exchange.

With these were a host of minor demands such as strengthening the disease control on meat imports, thus making them more expensive, and a ban on adding yellow food colouring to margarine, thus increasing the market for domestic butter. When the tariffs were raised in the Bülow tariff bill, the demand changed to defending the protectionist tariffs.

BDL members, rural, conservative and generally Protestant, in general despised the immorality of city life, and often associated it with Jews. They believed that Jews were genetically incapable of farming. Within the BDL this anti-semitism served a unifying function to help bring together the divergent interests of the Junker landowners and Hessian peasants. This commonality allowed the BDL to form large voting blocks which helped sway many a rural election, using machine politics.

As the BDL grew in strength, the Conservative Party depended upon them more and more for the defense of conservative positions in the Reichstag and in regional assemblies. However, this dependence ultimately changed the character of the party. The goals of the old-time conservatives, empire and enforced morality, defense of "throne and altar", became less important, while higher income for agroproducers gained in importance. Sometimes conflicts arose between the BDL and the party, and the BDL would withdraw its support from a troublesome conservative candidate, or throw its weight on a parliamentary vote over to the minority parties. However, the BDL's attempt to act independently of the Conservative Party did not always work. Thus in the Reichstag elections of 1903 the BDL attempted to run their own candidates, however only four were elected to the Reichstag. After this failure, Conservatives and the BDL recognized their need for each other, and there was greater unanimity.

In the areas where the Conservatives were poorly represented, for example, in the Province of Hanover, in Hesse and in the Palatinate, the BDL worked together with the right wing of the National Liberals. After all, the BDL had enlisted the support of about 60% of the National Liberal candidates for their programme before the general election of 1907. In parts of the southwestern states of Germany, the BDL operated in conjunction with or as the local farmers' union or league.

The BDL met with some successes and some failures. After several years they brought down the Caprivi government over the question of tariffs. But they never got the strict import restrictions on grain that they desired. The new tariff act of 1902 was indeed a victory for agrarians. However, as Nick Koning shows, it was not simply forced through by the aristocracy or agrarians. Instead it resulted from a new shift in the position of the urban interests that created an industrial-agrarian agreement. That agreement was initiated by the industrialists, not the junkers.

The BDL was particularly effective on small issues, where the Reichstag members were less committed to their constituencies, such as forbidding yellowing of margarine and stiff restrictions on brandy and sugar imports. On the political side they along with their political ally, the Conservative Party, were unable to prevent the fall of the Bülow government over budget issues and the reform of the inheritance tax in 1909.

Overall, the BDL operated a highly successful lobbying effort both within and outside the Reichstag and regional assemblies. The BDL solicited the various candidates before the elections and only supported those who affirmed in writing their support of the BDL programme. Contemporary critics claimed that this was an unconstitutional practice, but it wasn't legal challenged, and the loss of BDL support could be critical for a candidate. As the BDL was not a political party, they had representation in most of the parliamentary caucuses. After nearly every election there would be up to 100 Reichstag members who belonged to the BDL or were otherwise politically tied to them. In the Prussian parliament, the BDL could always rely on at least a third of the deputies.

During World War I, the BDL, consistent with its conservative position, had expansive war aims. At the beginning of the Weimar Republic, it merged with the Deutscher Landbund (German Agricultural League) and others to form the Reichslandbund (RLB) (Reich Agricultural League)in 1921, which then further merged with the Union of German Farmers to form the Grüne Front (Green Front). However, the strong Junker influence in the Grüne Front drove many farmers out. Nonetheless in 1933 under the National Socialist German Workers' Party (Nazi Party) it became the Reichsnährstand (State Food Society).
