= German tariff of 1879 =

Tariff imposed by Imperial Germany

The German tariff of 1879 was a protectionist law passed by the Reichstag (under the guidance of Chancellor Otto von Bismarck) that imposed tariffs on industrial and agricultural imports into Imperial Germany.

== Background ==
Following the end of the Napoleonic Wars in 1815, Prussia had adopted low tariffs (including for grain) and these became the basis of the Zollverein tariff of 1834. In 1853 the duties on grain were abolished and in 1862 the commercial treaty with France (along with similar treaties with other states) substantially reduced the duties for manufactured goods. The Treaty of Frankfurt of 1871 established most favoured nation status between Germany and France. In 1873 free trade won its last victory in Germany with the abolition of the duty on iron. Tariffs were now for raising revenue and not for protective purposes, with the German Empire therefore almost a completely free-trading state. In 1850 two-thirds of Germany was employed in agriculture and this proportion declined slowly until 1870. During the 1850s and 1860s Germany was a net exporter of grain and its farmers opposed tariffs for industry as this might have led to reprisals by Britain against German grain. However, industrialists favoured tariffs against British goods to safeguard their infant industries and they therefore came to believe that winning over the farmers to protectionism was crucial.

After the Franco-Prussian War of 1871, France had to pay an indemnity to Germany. A considerable portion of the indemnity was paid in bills of exchange and in gold. This gave impetus to industry but it also led to over-production: the number of joint-stock companies in Prussia in 1870 was 410, with total capital of three milliard marks; by the end of 1874 there were 2,267 companies with capital amounting to seven and one-third milliards. The Panic of 1873, however, led to a depression, with low prices in Germany temporarily shielding it from foreign competition. Although prices began to rise with the subsequent economic recovery, this recovery was hampered by British manufacturers dumping their goods on the German market. German manufacturers renewed their demand for protection, with the textile and iron industries the most strongly in favour.

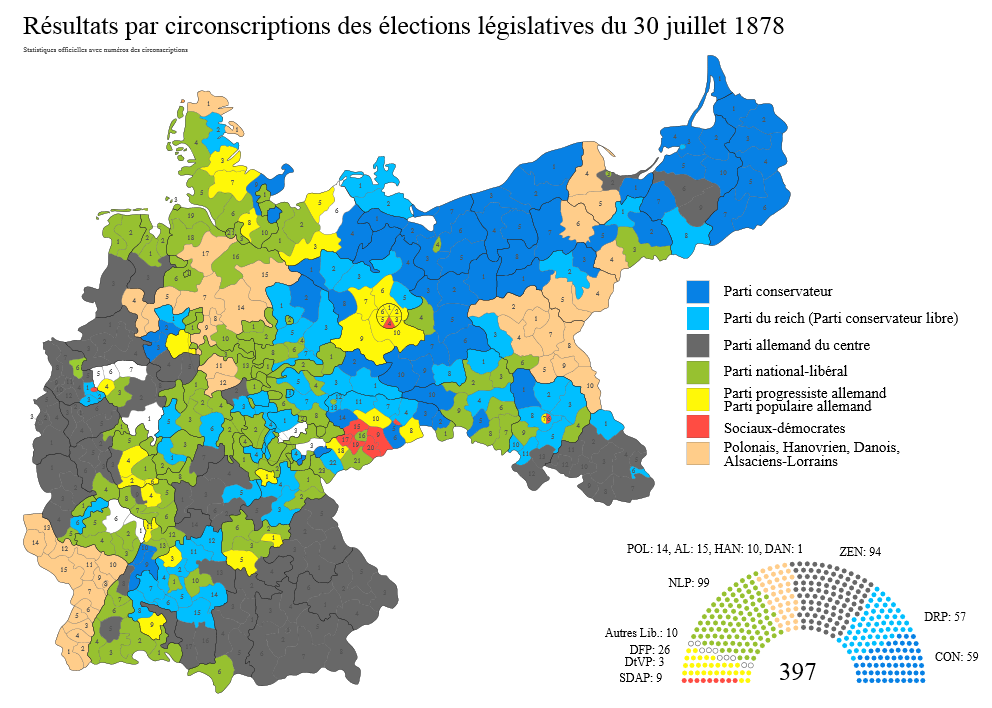
Result of the 1878 election. The protectionist Centrist and conservative parties are coloured grey and blue respectively.

In the late 1870s world grain prices started to fall due to the opening up of the American prairies to cultivation following the settlement of the Midwest after the Civil War. The increase in railways also helped cheapen grain (which also aided Russian farmers). German grain started to lose ground and Germany became a net importer of wheat and rye. Agricultural labourers were migrating to the towns to find work in industry and landowners began to favour protection. The Prussian landowner Guido Henckel von Donnersmarck complained to Heinrich von Tiedemann about the sixfold increase in American grain, flour and meat exports "in truly unbelivable numbers, for German agriculture, there must be a grain, flour and meat tariff as an unconditional necessity if we are not to expose it to the same fluctuations as industry".

In 1876 both the Association of Tax and Economic Reformers (consisting mostly of large landowners) and the Central Association of German Industrialists were founded and in 1878 they combined to pressure the government into protecting both agriculture and industry. This coalition of interests into a solidarity bloc was called the marriage of iron and rye or the alliance of steel and rye. The autumn of 1878 witnessed a high-point in their protectionist campaign and in the Reichstag 204 deputies (including 87 Centrists, 36 Conservatives and 27 Liberals) formed a cross-party association in favour of protection. In October 1878 the Centre Party announced its support for protection. On 24 February 1879 the organisation of the largest 250 landowners—the Congress of German Landowners—also adopted protectionism. However, the Socialist Congress held in Gotha in 1876 declared that "the Socialists of Germany are indifferent to the controversy raging in the proprietary classes as to Protection and Free Trade; the problem is a practical one, and must be so considered in each particular case".

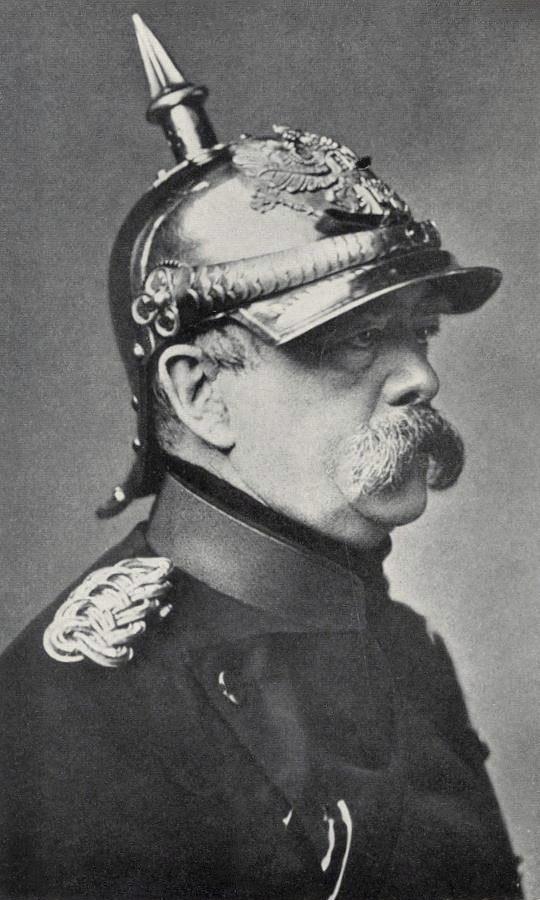
Otto von Bismarck

On 31 March 1878 Bismarck met Wilhelm von Kardorff, an industrialist and a landowner, informing him of his conversion to "moderate protective and finance tariffs". On 12 November he announced that the Bundesrat should appoint a Tariff Commission to draft tariff legislation. On 15 December Bismarck sent the committee a letter in which he stated that the financial object of the tariff was the reduction of direct taxation and the increase in indirect taxation. He estimated that if the tariff rates were 5 per cent. ad valorem the revenue they would yield would be about 70 million marks, roughly the same amount sent to the imperial exchequer by the federal states in 1878–79. He further argued:

I leave undecided the question whether complete mutual freedom of international commerce, such as is contemplated by the theory of Free Trade, would not serve the interests of Germany. But as long as most of the countries with which our trade is carried on surround themselves with customs barriers, which there is still a growing tendency to multiply, it does not seem to me justifiable, or to the economic interest of the nation, that we should allow ourselves to be restricted in the satisfaction of our financial wants by the apprehension that German products will thereby be slightly preferred to foreign ones.

Bismarck stated that a general tariff protecting native industry was superior to tariffs for particular industries because:

...its effects would be more equally spread over all the productive circles of the land than is the case with a system of protective duties for isolated branches of industry. The minority of the population, which does not produce at all, but exclusively consumes, will apparently be injured by a customs system favouring the entire national production. Yet if by means of such a system the aggregate sum of the values produced in the country increase, and thus the national wealth be on the whole enhanced, the non-producing parts of the population...will eventually be benefited.

In the Reichstag Bismarck announced that from henceforth the government's income would come from indirect rather than from direct taxation. Also, since "other states surround themselves with customs barriers it seems to me justified...that German products have a small advantage over foreign ones". The adoption of protectionism by Bismarck signalled a shift towards a greater reliance on the Conservatives for support rather than on the National Liberals. The tariff was supported by the two Conservative Parties and the Centre Party and opposed by the Progressives and the Socialists, with the Liberals divided. On 31 March Bismarck held a meeting with the Centrist deputy Ludwig Windthorst, where Bismarck agreed to relax the Kulturkampf against the Catholic Church in exchange for Centrist support for protection. The committee that drafted the tariff legislation was chaired by Georg Freiherr von und zu Franckenstein. He gave his name to a clause in the legislation that limited to 130 million marks as the maximum amount the central government could receive from customs revenue and the tobacco duty. The remaining amount would go to the federal states. On 9 July 1879 the Reichstag voted for the Franckenstein clause by 211 votes to 122 against. On 12 July the tariff bill was voted for by a majority of 100.

== Rates ==
The tariff imposed moderate import duties on grain and raised the duties on livestock products. Wheat, rye and oats were subject to a duty of 1 mark per 100 kg; on barley and maize 50 pfennigs; on flour 2 marks; on meat 12 marks; on oxen 20 marks; sheep 1 mark; pigs 25 marks. Raw materials for industry such as cotton, flax, hemp, wool and coal were admitted duty-free. The duty on pig iron was 1 mark; on semi-manufactured goods made from iron and steel it ranged from 2 to 2.5 marks; for other iron and steel goods the duty ranged from 7.5 to 15 marks. On machinery it was 3 to 8 marks; for yarns and textiles the rates were 15 to 30 per cent. ad valorem.

== Effects ==
The tariff protected the great landowners east of the Elbe—the Ostelbier or Junkers—from competition from cheap American grain. Without protection many of these landowners would have declined; the tariff preserved the economic existence and the political ascendancy of the Junker class. Many working men considered the tariff a tax on their food and along with the Anti-Socialist Laws that banned the Social Democratic Party, the tariff helped alienate the working class from the state. The historian Erich Eyck argued that if Germany's political culture at the beginning of the 20th century differed from that in Western Europe, agricultural protection was largely responsible.

== See also ==
- Mercantilism
