= German tariff of 1902 =

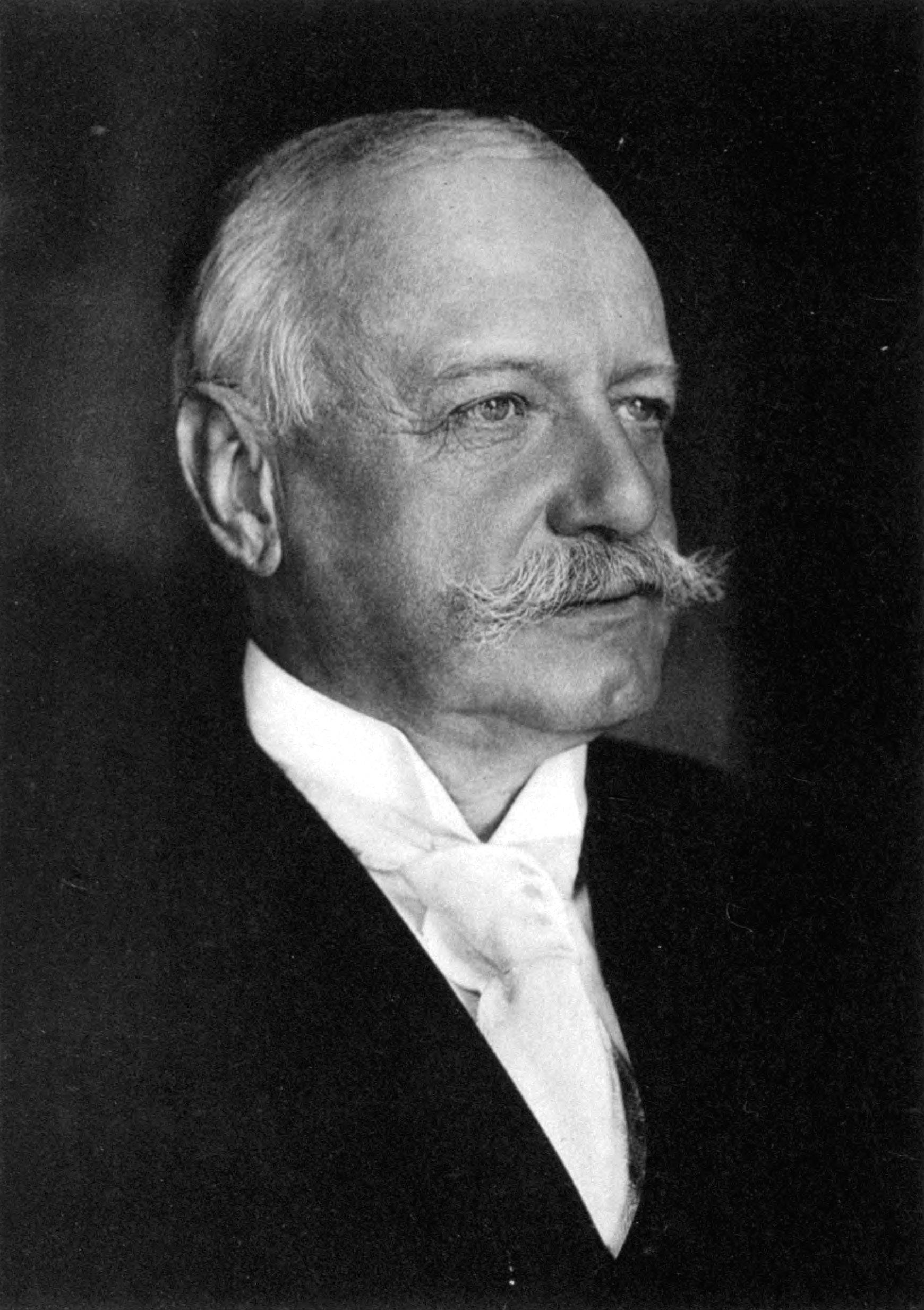
Bernhard von Bülow

The German tariff of 1902 was a protectionist law passed by the Reichstag (under the guidance of Chancellor Bernhard von Bülow) that raised tariffs on agricultural imports into Imperial Germany. It became law on 25 December 1902.

== Background ==
One of Bülow's predecessors, Leo von Caprivi, had negotiated commercial treaties with Austria-Hungary and Italy that had led to increased imports of foreign grain. Along with good harvests this caused a decline in the prices of wheat and rye until 1894, when they increased until 1898. In 1898 the price of wheat in Prussia was 39s.10d. per imperial quarter. This declined to 32s.1d. in 1900 but rose again to 35s.2s. in 1902. The price of rye in Prussia remained steady: it was 7s.3d. per cwt. in 1898 and 7s.2d. in 1902.

The agrarian interest (represented by the Junker-dominated German Agrarian League) complained of urbanisation caused by industrialisation; this was robbing the land of agricultural workers. They denounced the policy of the trade treaties that had facilitated the increase in industrial exports but which had also increased agricultural imports. Instead, they lobbied for increased duties for all branches of agriculture. Their pressure was the decisive factor in bringing about higher rates of agricultural protection.

Bülow's policy was to increase tariffs in the hope that these would give greater leverage to the government in the negotiations due when the treaties expired in 1906. He also wished for greater specialisation in the tariff schedules to enable specific duties to be lowered without having to reduce those on others. The tariff bill was introduced in the Reichstag in 1901 but due to the intense debate over it, the bill was not passed until December 1902.

== Rates ==
The tariff schedule introduced maximum and minimum duties on wheat, rye, oats and malting barley. These minimum rates were the lowest that could be levied in any future commercial treaty. The maximum duty on wheat was 7.50 marks per 100kg, the minimum duty was 5.50 marks. The maximum duty on rye and oats was 7 marks, the minimum was 5 marks. The maximum duty on malting barley was 7 marks, the minimum 4 marks. In the treaties negotiated afterwards, the minimum rates on grain (which came into force in March 1906) were generally used.

The duty on maize was raised to 5 marks; on flour to 18.75 marks; on butter and cheese 30 marks; on eggs 6 marks; on meat 45 marks; on bullocks, cows and pigs 18 marks and on wine 24 marks.
