= Siegfried von Kardorff =

German politician

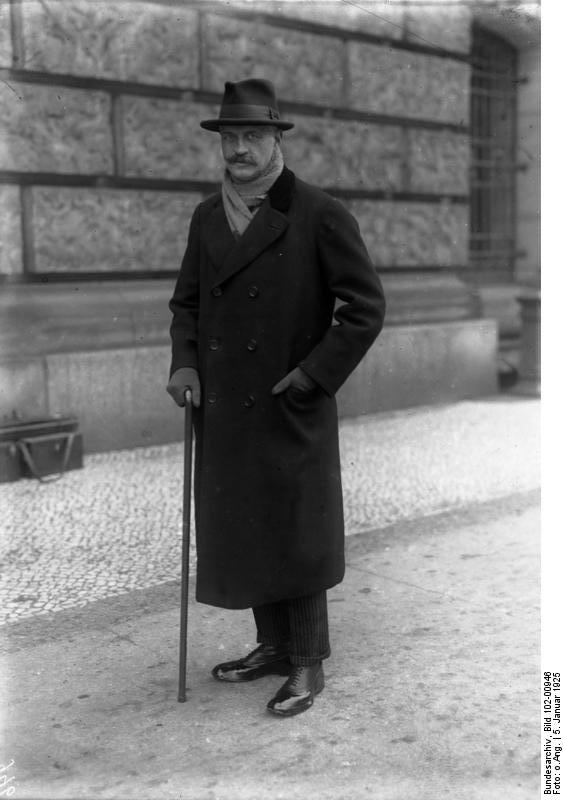
- Kardoff in 1925

Member of the Prussian House of Representatives
- In office 1910–1918

Member of the Reichstag
- In office 1920–1932
- Constituency: Potsdam II

Member of the Prussian Landtag
- In office 1919–1925

Personal details
- Born: 4 February 1873 Berlin, Germany
- Died: 12 October 1945 (aged 72) Berlin, Germany
- Party: FKP (1910-1918); DNVP (1918-1920); DVP (1920-1933)
- Parent: Wilhelm von Kardorff

Siegfried Alfred Rudolf Friedrich von Kardorff (4 February 1873 in Berlin − 12 October 1945 in Berlin) was a German politician.

== Life ==
He was born the son of Wilhelm von Kardorff and followed him in adopting a career in politics. He studied law and began a career in the civil service in 1901. In 1904 he was assigned to become part of the Prussian Agriculture Ministry and became a Landrat for Posen in 1908.

In 1909 he entered the Prussian House of Representatives as a member of Free Conservative Party but left the party in 1918 in opposition to the three-class franchise.

Describing himself as a "left-wing Free Conservative", Kardoff helped found the German National People's Party. At one of its first public meetings in December 1918, Kardorff was the main speaker. He declared: "Our new party, in which friendly right-wing parties have united, has no past and rejects any responsibility for the past. We have a present and, if God will, a good future". Kardorff said that the party would uphold the monarchy, agriculture, the middle class and the church: "But we are not a party of Lutheran orthodoxy, rather we find recognition wherever living Christianity is found".

From 1920 to 1932 he was member of German Reichstag, while at the same time being a member of the Prussian House of Representatives from 1919-1925. He had joined the DNVP in November of 1918 but over time he became increasingly uncomfortable with the parties indifference to the Kapp Putsch and its embrace of the Stab-in-the-back myth. Which led him to join the German People's Party in April 1920, joining the parties left-wing. He was inclined to work with the SPD and would go on to support Streseman's first cabinet in 1923; based on these inclinations he proposed the creation of a new party to unite all the pro-republic parties in Germany though this party never formed. His support of Streseman's first cabinet led President Friedrich Erbert to ask him to form a new Great Coalition but this was prevented due to opposition from the DVP and the DNVP. From 1928 to 1932 he served as Reichstag Vice President.

In February 1932, alongside the SPD and the Zentrum Party and Julius Curtius, he blocked a vote of no confidence against Heinrich Brüning. And since a majority of his Party supported the vote, he was expelled from the party. He retired in 1933 and lived the rest of his life privately in Berlin.

He also composed political biographies of Otto von Bismarck and his father; the latter was praised by G. P. Gooch, Carlton J. H. Hayes and Sidney B. Fay.
