= Marriage of Iron and Rye =

The Marriage of Iron and Rye is the name given to the coalition of interests between industry and agriculture that supported the adoption of protectionism in Imperial Germany by the Tariff of 1879.

In 1818 Prussia adopted low tariffs (including for grain) and these became the basis of the Zollverein tariff of 1834. In 1853 the duties on grain were abolished and in 1862 the commercial treaty with France (along with similar treaties with other states) greatly cut the duties for manufactured goods. The Treaty of Frankfurt of 1871 instituted most favoured nation status between Germany and France. During the 1850s and 1860s Germany was a net exporter of grain and its farmers opposed tariffs for industry as this might have led to reprisals by Britain against German grain. However, industrialists favoured tariffs against British goods to safeguard their infant industries and therefore came to believe that winning over the farmers to protectionism was crucial.

In the late 1870s world grain prices started to fall due to the opening up of the American prairies to cultivation following the settlement of the Midwest after the Civil War. The increase in railways also helped cheapen grain (which also aided Russian farmers). German grain started to lose ground and Germany became a net importer of wheat and rye. In 1876 both the Association of Tax and Economic Reformers (consisting mostly of large landowners) and the Central Association of German Industrialists were founded and in 1878 they combined to pressure the government into protecting both agriculture and industry. The adoption of protectionism by the Chancellor, Otto von Bismarck, signalled a shift towards a greater reliance on the Conservatives for support rather than on the National Liberals. The tariff was supported by the two Conservative Parties and the Centre Party and opposed by the Progressives and the Socialists, with the Liberals divided.

The tariff protected the great landowners east of the Elbe—the Ostelbier or Junkers—from competition from cheap American grain. Without protection many of these landowners would have declined; the tariff preserved the economic existence and the political ascendancy of the Junker class. Many working men considered the tariff a tax on their food. Along with the Anti-Socialist Laws that banned the Social Democratic Party, the tariff helped alienate the working class from the state. The historian Erich Eyck argued that if Germany's political culture at the beginning of the 20th century differed from Western Europe, agricultural protection was largely responsible.

== Tariff rates ==
The tariff of 15 July 1879 imposed moderate import duties on grain and raised the duties on livestock products. Wheat, rye and oats were subject to a duty of 1 mark per 100kg. On 22 May 1885 these were increased to 3 marks and on 21 December 1887 to 5 marks. On 6 December 1891 the duties on wheat and rye were lowered to 3.50 marks, that on oats to 2.80 marks. On 25 December 1902 the tariff was again modified, with wheat subject of a duty ranging from 7.50-5.50 marks and that on rye and oats to 7-5 marks. On 1 March 1906 the duty on rye was changed to 5.50 marks, those on rye and oats to 5 marks. The duty on meat in 1879 was 12 marks, in 1885 20 marks, in 1891 15 marks (7 marks for pork), in 1902 45 marks and in 1906 27 marks.
