= Wilhelm von Kardorff =

German landowner and politician (1928–1907)

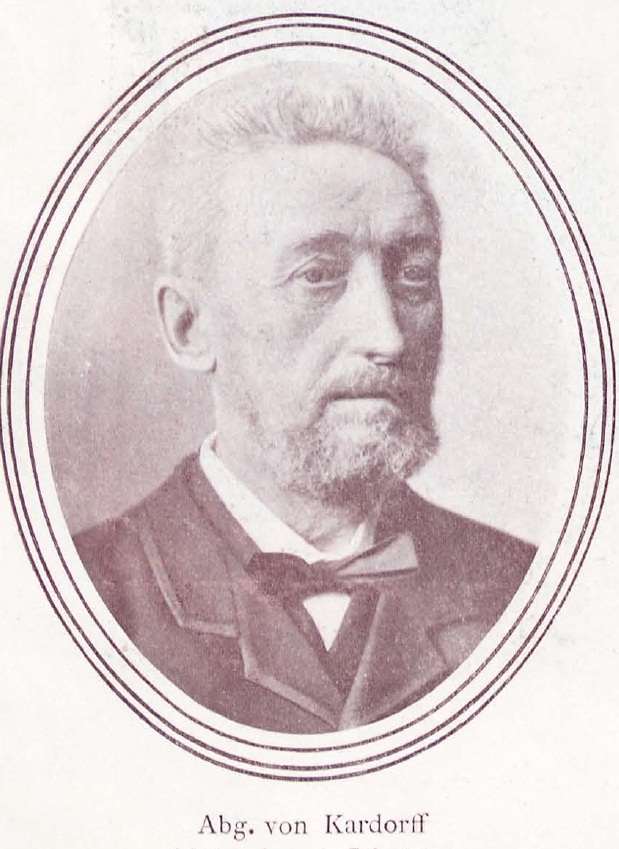
Wilhelm von Kardorff in 1903.

Wilhelm von Kardorff (8 January 1828 in Neustrelitz – 21 July 1907) was a German landowner and politician who supported the Free Conservative Party. From the founding of the North German Confederation in 1867 until his death he was one of the most influential members of his party.

== Life ==
He was educated at Heidelberg and Halle, where he fought 31 duels. He joined the Prussian civil service in the late 1840s and during the next decade purchased large estates in Silesia.

He greatly admired Otto von Bismarck and enjoyed a close friendship with him. Following the Panic of 1873 and the consequent economic depression, Kardorff campaigned for the restoration of protectionism, founding the Central Association of German Industrialists in 1876. This campaign was successful, with Bismarck passing a tariff in 1879. G. P. Gooch considered this the greatest achievement of Kardorff's career.

Kardorff was the Reichstag's primary expert on economic affairs. His economic ideas were influenced by Henry Charles Carey and he fought unsuccessfully for the adoption of bimetallism, persuading the Reichstag but not the British, who favoured gold. He also opposed Leo von Caprivi's commercial treaties that led to freer trade and campaigned for higher tariff rates, succeeding in 1902.
