= Erich Eyck =

German historian (1878–1964)

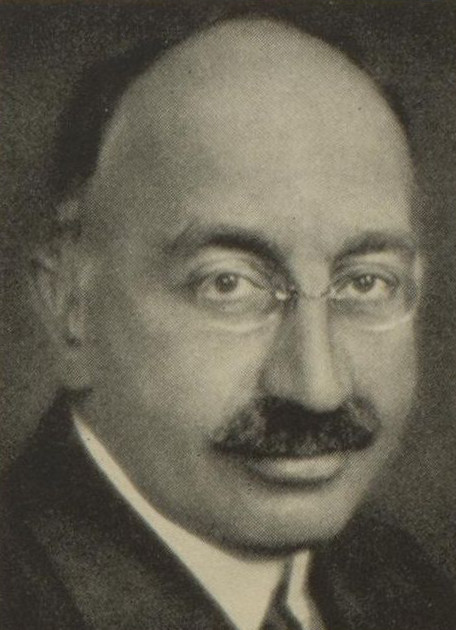
Erich Eyck

Erich Eyck (1878 – 23 June 1964) was a German historian.

He was born in Berlin and studied to become a lawyer. Before the First World War one of his clients was the Russian Marxist revolutionary Anatoly Lunacharsky. In 1928 he was elected to the Berlin Town Assembly, standing as a Democrat. Eyck also wrote articles for the Vossische Zeitung. However, following the rise of Adolf Hitler, Eyck emigrated to Britain in 1937, living in Boars Hill, Berkshire and Hampstead, London. He took British nationality after 1945.

From then on he focused on history, writing biographies of Otto von Bismarck and Wilhelm II, as well as a two-volume history of the Weimar Republic. From early on in his life he had admired Britain's liberal political system and his political beliefs influenced his historical work. Eyck wrote that he was "of the Liberal persuasion" and in 1938 he wrote a biography of the Liberal politician William Ewart Gladstone, who was his ideal statesman.

In the early 1940s, he wrote a three-volume biography of Bismarck. According to The Times, Eyck was one of the few people to have read all the evidence concerning Bismarck's career. Karina Urbach has written that as "a lawyer, Eyck despised Bismarck's lack of respect for the rule of law, and as a liberal he passionately condemned Bismarck's cynicism towards liberal, democratic, and humanitarian ideals". Eyck's interpretation was criticised by Hans Rothfels and Franz Schnabel, who argued that Eyck's belief that Germany could have gone down a liberal road was unrealistic and that Germany could have been united only by Bismarck. Gerhard Ritter wrote to Eyck, lamenting that his work would confirm the negative impression people abroad had of German history.

Eyck enjoyed a friendship with Theodor Heuss, the first President of postwar Germany. In 1953 Heuss awarded him the Grand Cross of Merit.

== Works ==
- Die Krisis der deutschen Rechtspflege (Berlin, 1926).
- Gladstone (Erlenbach-Zürich and Leipzig: Eugen Rentsch Verlag, 1938).
- Bismarck:
  - Volume I (Erlenbach-Zürich: Eugen Rentsch Verlag, 1941).
  - Volume II (Erlenbach-Zürich: Eugen Rentsch Verlag, 1943)
  - Volume III (Erlenbach-Zürich: Eugen Rentsch Verlag, 1944).
- Die Pitts und die Fox: Zwei Paar verschlungener Lebensläufe (Zürich: Rentsch, 1947).
  - (English translation by Eric Northcott), Pitt versus Fox: Father and Son (London: Bell, 1950).
- Das Persönliche Regiment Wilhelms II: Politische Geschichte des Deutschen Kaiserreiches von 1890 bis 1914 (Erlenbach-Zurich: Eugen Rentsch Verlag, 1948).
- Bismarck After Fifty Years (London: George Phillip & Son, 1948)
  - (Essay published as a pamphlet by the Historical Association)
- Bismarck and the German Empire (London: George Allen & Unwin, 1950).
- Geschichte der Weimarer Republik, Band I: Vom Zusammenbruch des Kaisertums bis zur Wahl Hindenburgs (Erlenbach-Zürich: Eugen Rentsch Verlag, 1954).
  - (English translation by Harlan P. Hanson and Robert G. L. Waite), A History of the Weimar Republic. Volume I: From the Collapse of the Empire to Hindenburg's Election (Cambridge, Mass: Harvard University Press, 1962).
- Geschichte der Weimarer Republik, Band II: Von Der Konferenz von Locarno bis zu Hitlers Machtubernahme (Erlenbach-Zürich: Eugen Rentsch Verlag, 1956).
  - (English translation by Harlan P. Hanson and Robert G. L. Waite), A History of the Weimar Republic. Volume II: From the Locarno Conference to Hitler's Seizure of Power (Cambridge, Mass: Harvard University Press, 1963).
