= Urbanization in the German Empire =

Overview of urbanisation in the German Empire

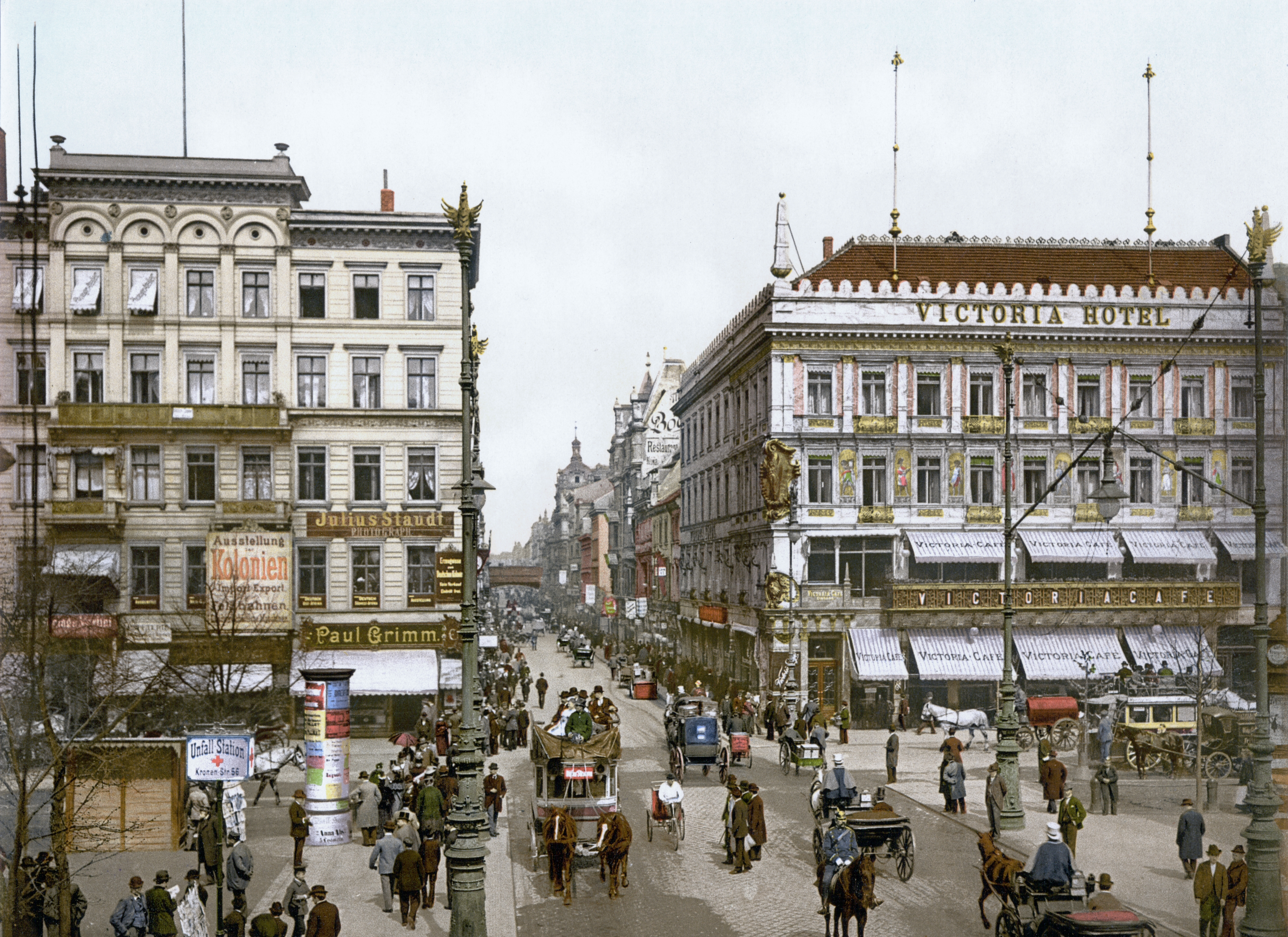
Berlin circa 1890

Between 1871 and 1910, the German Empire experienced a period of both large-scale industrialisation and large-scale urbanisation. As a result of this movement of people from rural areas to cities, living and working conditions were often poor, setting the scene for the social conflict within Germany that was to follow.

== Summary ==
Population distribution of the total German population by size of locality (1871–1910)
| Size of locality | 1871 | 1875 | 1880 | 1885 | 1890 | 1895 | 1900 | 1905 | 1910 |
| Less than 2,000 | 63.9% | 61.0% | 58.6% | 56.3% | 53.0% | 49.8% | 45.6% | 42.6% | 40.0% |
| 2,000 to 4,999 | 12.4% | 12.6% | 12.7% | 12.4% | 12.0% | 12.0% | 12.1% | 11.8% | 11.2% |
| 5,000 to 19,999 | 11.2% | 12.0% | 12.6% | 12.9% | 13.1% | 13.6% | 13.5% | 13.7% | 14.1% |
| 20,000 to 99,999 | 7.7% | 8.2% | 8.9% | 8.9% | 9.8% | 10.7% | 12.6% | 12.9% | 13.4% |
| 100,000 and more | 4.8% | 6.2% | 7.2% | 9.5% | 12.1% | 13.9% | 16.2% | 19.0% | 21.3% |

Between 1871 and 1910, the number of Germans who lived in urban areas significantly increased. While the percentage of Germans who lived in communities (localities) with less than 2,000 people decreased from 64% to 40% between 1871 and 1910, the percentage of Germans who lived in communities with 20,000 to 99,999 people increased from 8% to 13% and the percentage of Germans who lived in communities with 100,000 or more people increased from 5% to 21% during the same time period.

However, this urbanization occurred unevenly throughout Germany. Specifically, Germany's urbanization and industrialization was focused on the north and west while Germany's south and east retained their predominantly rural character. For instance, two-thirds of the population of both East Prussia and Posen Province (in the eastern part of Germany) lived in communities of less than 2,000 people in 1910 while only two-fifths of all Germans did and while only one-fifth of the population in both the Rhineland and Westphalia (in the western part of Germany) did. Overall, the most robust urbanization in Germany during this time period occurred in the Rhineland, Westphalia, Saxony, and Brandenburg. Similarly, industrial development in Germany during this time focused on the Ruhr, Saxony, and Silesia. Out of the total population in these provinces, 47% of Brandenburg's population, 40% of Westphalia's population, and 50% of the Rhineland's population lived in communities of 20,000 people or more in 1910.

Between 1875 and 1910, German cities experienced a huge increase in their population. During this time, the number of German cities with more than 10,000 residents increased from 271 to 576. Similarly, during this time, the number of German cities with a population of more than 200,000 people increased from 3 to 23 during the same time period. In addition, the German cities of Duisburg, Essen, and Kiel all had their populations increase by five times or more during this time period. Specifically, Duisburg's population increased from 37,380 to 229,438, Essen's population increased from 54,790 to 294,653, and Kiel's population increased from 37,246 to 211,627 during this time period.

== Consequences ==
As a result of Germany's urbanization, Germany's working-class often had to deal with miserable working and living conditions. In turn, this set the stage for intense social conflict within Germany as well as led to the rise of the German Social Democratic Party--the largest socialist party in the world during this time—thanks to large-scale worker support for it.

== See also ==
- Category:Timelines of cities in Germany
