= Friedrich Abraham Wilhelm von Arnim =

Prussian politician and diplomat

Friedrich von Arnim

Prussian Envoy to Saxony
- In office 1792–1794
- Preceded by: Karl Friedrich von Gessler
- Succeeded by: Karl Christian von Brockhausen

Personal details
- Born: Friedrich Abraham Wilhelm von Arnim-Boitzenburg; 31 December 1739 Berlin, Kingdom of Prussia
- Died: 1812
- Spouse: Georgine Charlotte Auguste von Lichtenstein (m. 1795; div. 1806)
- Relations: Adolph Friedrich von der Schulenburg (grandfather); Georg Dietloff von Arnim-Boitzenburg (grandfather)
- Parent(s): Friedrich Wilhelm von Arnim-Boitzenburg; Freda Antoinette von Cramm

Friedrich Abraham Wilhelm von Arnim-Boitzenburg (13 June 1767 – 31 January 1812), was a Prussian politician and diplomat who served as Envoy to Saxony and Denmark).

== Early life ==
Arnim was born in Berlin on 13 June 1767 into the prominent and wealthy Arnim family. He was the only surviving child of Count Friedrich Wilhelm von Arnim-Boitzenburg (1739–1801) and Baroness Freda Antoinette von Cramm (1747–1817). His father served as Chief Minister of the Kingdom of Prussia from 1786 to 1798 under Kings Frederick William II (who raised him to a hereditary Prussian Count on 2 October 1786) and Frederick William III.

His maternal grandparents were Baron Franz Jakob von Cramm and Anna Magdalena Wilhelmine von Krosigk. His father was the only child of Abraham Wilhelm von Arnim-Boitzenburg (son of Georg Dietloff von Arnim-Boitzenburg), and Anna Elisabeth von der Schulenburg (eldest daughter of Adolph Friedrich von der Schulenburg).

== Career ==
From a long line of Prussian landowners, Arnim was admitted to the Order of St. John and served as chamberlain to King Frederick William II. He was a legation councilor before becoming Envoy in Dresden (to the Kingdom of Saxony) from 1792 to 1794 and in Copenhagen (to the Kingdom of Denmark).

== Personal life ==
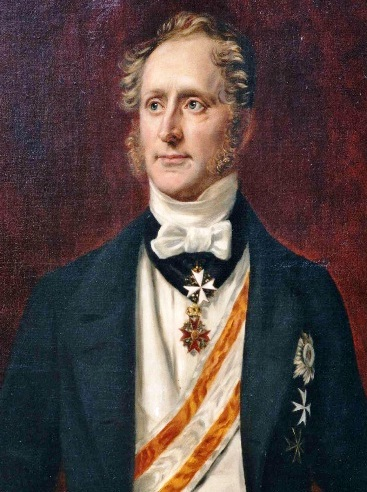
Portrait of his second son, Count Adolf Heinrich von Arnim-Boitzenburg

On 18 July 1795 Arnim was married to Georgine Charlotte Auguste (née von Wallmoden-Gimborn) von Lichtenstein (1770–1850), the divorced former wife of Baron Karl August von Lichtenstein, a German opera singer and composer. The eldest daughter of the Hanoverian field marshal and art collector Johann Ludwig, Reichsgraf von Wallmoden-Gimborn and Charlotte Christiane Auguste Wilhelmine von Wangenheim, her father was an illegitimate son of King George II of Great Britain by his mistress Amalie von Wallmoden. Among her siblings were brother Ludwig von Wallmoden-Gimborn, the Austrian General of Cavalry, and sister Wilhelmine Magdalene Friederike (wife of Baron Heinrich Friedrich Karl vom Stein). Before their divorce in 1806, they were the parents of:

- Count Friedrich Ludwig von Arnim-Boitzenburg (1796–1866), who married Sophie Amalie von Heister in 1829.
- Countess Luise Charlotte von Arnim-Boitzenburg (1799–1808), who died young.
- Countess Pauline Charlotte von Arnim-Boitzenburg (1801–1804), who died young.
- Count Adolf Heinrich von Arnim-Boitzenburg (1803–1868), the 1st Minister President of Prussia (under King Frederick William IV) who married Countess Anna Caroline von der Schulenburg, a daughter of Count Hans Günther Werner von der Schulenburg, in 1830.
- Count Wilhelm von Arnim-Boitzenburg (b. 1804), who died young.

After their divorce, she married Louis Charles Henri, the Marquis le Marchant de Charmont, Captain of the Cuirassiers, in Nancy in 1824.

Arnim died on 31 January 1812. His eldest son Friedrich Ludwig inherited Zichow and Kleinow estates in 1820 and acquired Blumberg in 1836 for 146,000 thalers.

=== Descendants ===
Through his son Adolf, he was a grandfather of politician Adolf von Arnim-Boitzenburg (1832–1887), governor of Silesia who was president of German Reichstag for a short time in 1880, and Marie von Arnim-Boitzenburg (wife of Karl Friedrich von Savigny).
