= Friedrich Wilhelm von Arnim-Boitzenburg =

Prussian civil servant and Minister of War

Chief Minister of the Kingdom of Prussia
- In office 1786–1798
- Monarchs: Frederick William II; Frederick William III
- Preceded by: Friedrich Anton von Heynitz
- Succeeded by: Christian von Haugwitz

Personal details
- Born: 31 December 1739 Berlin, Kingdom of Prussia
- Died: 21 January 1801 (aged 61) Berlin, Kingdom of Prussia
- Spouse: Baroness Freda Antoinette von Cramm (m. 1764; died 1801)
- Relations: Adolph Friedrich von der Schulenburg (grandfather); Georg Dietloff von Arnim-Boitzenburg (grandfather)
- Children: 2
- Education: University of Göttingen

Friedrich Wilhelm von Arnim-Boitzenburg (31 December 1739 – 21 January 1801) was a Prussian civil servant and Minister of War.

== Early life ==
Arnim was born 31 December 1739 in Berlin into the noble Arnim family. He was the only child of Abraham Wilhelm von Arnim-Boitzenburg (1712–1761), and Anna Elisabeth von der Schulenburg (eldest daughter of Adolph Friedrich von der Schulenburg). His paternal grandfather was Georg Dietloff von Arnim-Boitzenburg.

== Career ==
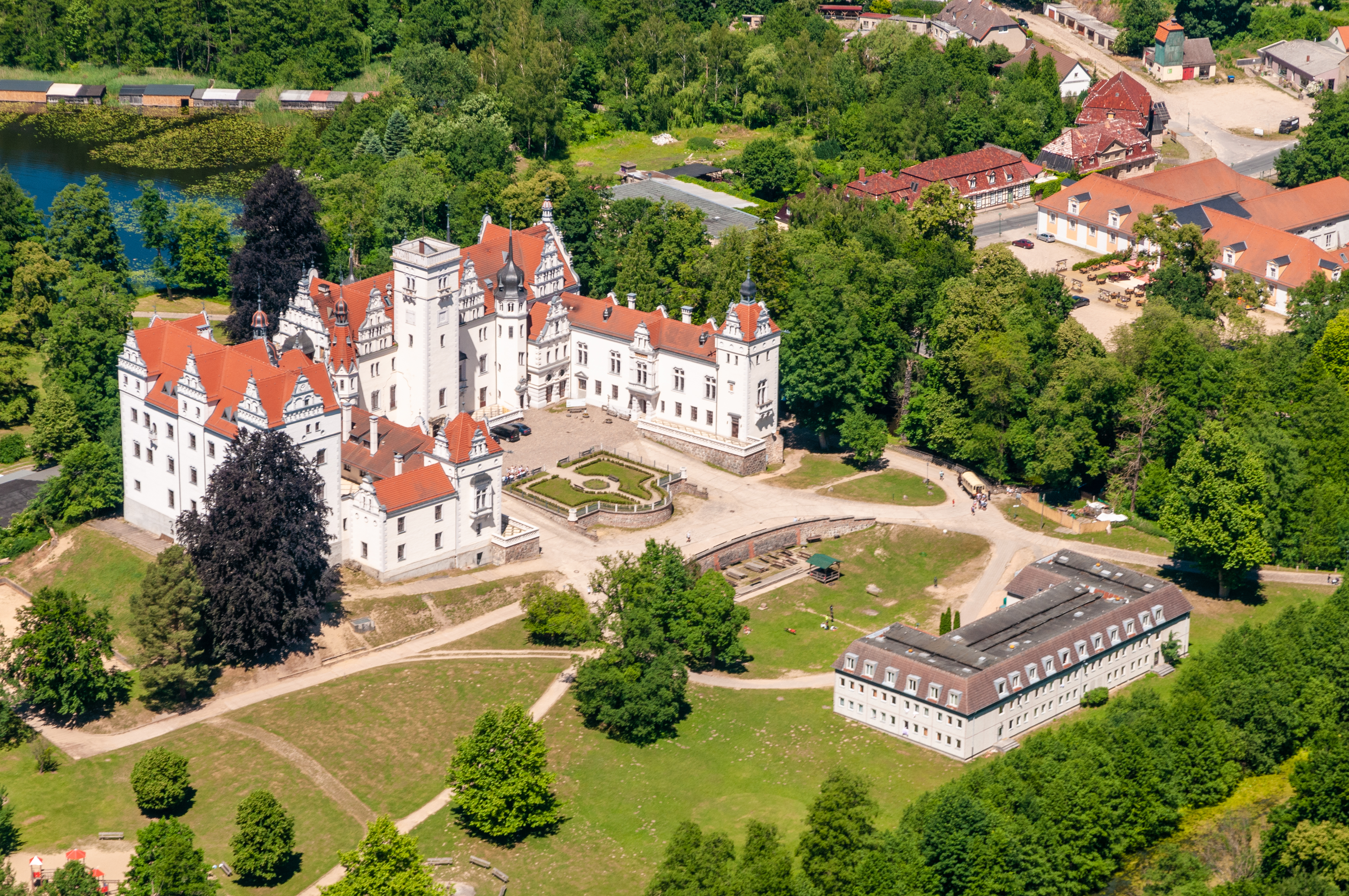
Boitzenburg Castle

After studying law in Göttingen, he began his career in the Prussian civil service as a councilor at the Chamber Court in Berlin. In 1764, he became a councilor and assessor at the Uckermark Higher Court, and in 1769 he became a secret judicial councilor and director of the Pupillary college and the Uckermark Higher Court, which he presided over until 1780. In 1786 he was appointed real secret budget, war and directing minister and vice president of the general directorate.

Arnim was raised to the hereditary Prussian count on 2 October 1786 by King Frederick William II. He was also a Knight of the Order of the Red Eagle.

He became president of the forestry department and chief hunter. In these two offices he made lasting contributions to the promotion of forestry and agriculture in Prussia. From 1786 to 1798 he was Royal Prussian Minister of State and War. In 1798 he took his leave for health reasons.

== Personal life ==
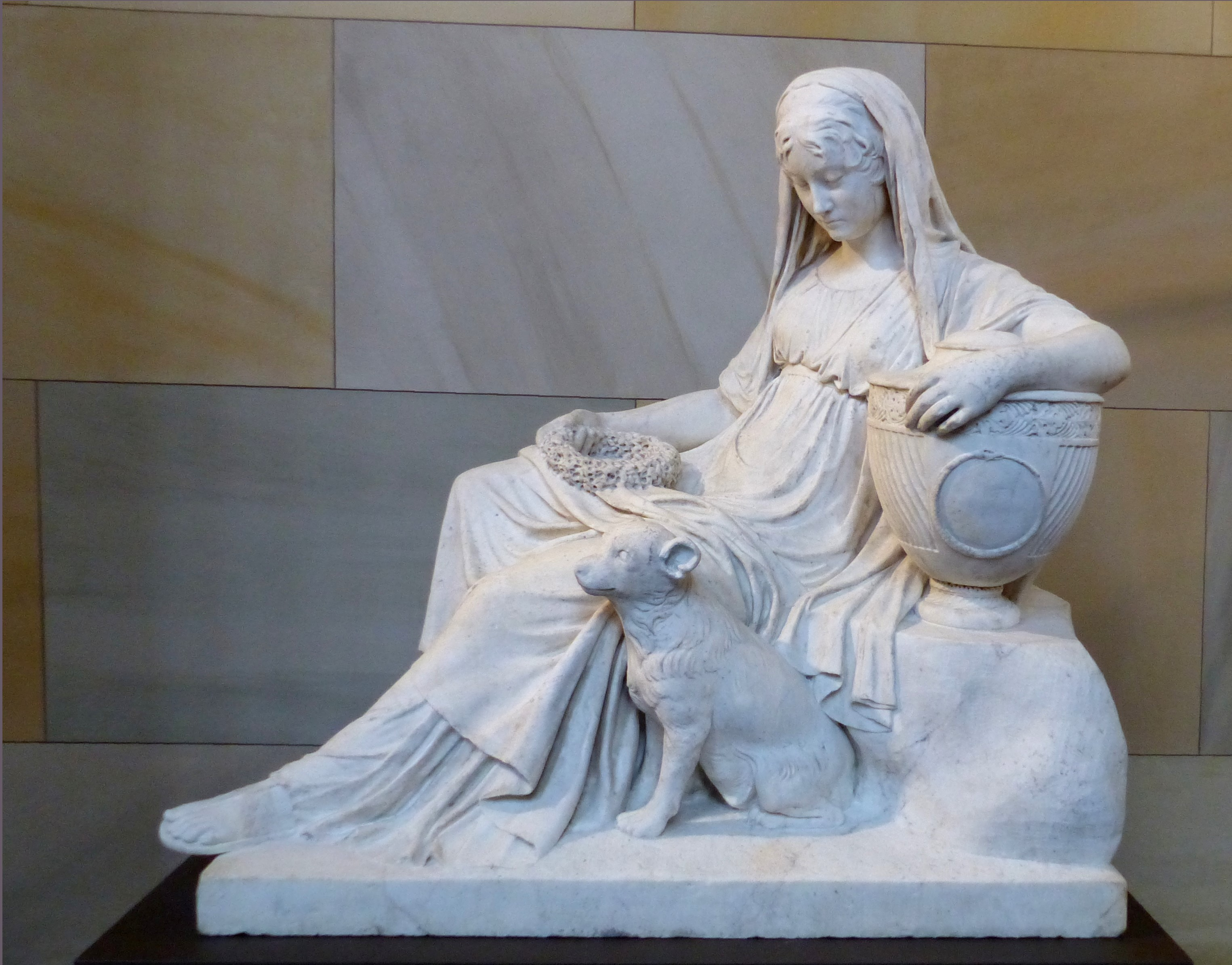
Monument for Count von Arnim-Boitzenburg, by Johann Gottfried Schadow

In 1764 Arnim was married to Baroness Freda Antoinette von Cramm (1747–1817), a daughter of Baron Franz Jakob von Cramm and Anna Magdalena Wilhelmine von Krosigk. Together, they were the parents of two children:

- Johann Erdmann von Arnim (1766–1766), who died young.
- Friedrich Abraham Wilhelm von Arnim (1767–1812), who married Georgine Charlotte Auguste von Wallmoden-Gimborn, a daughter of Johann Ludwig, Reichsgraf von Wallmoden-Gimborn (himself an illegitimate son of King George II of Great Britain by his mistress Amalie von Wallmoden).

Arnim died in Berlin on 21 January 1801.
