= Karl Friedrich von Savigny =

Prussian diplomat and politician

Karl Friedrich von Savigny (19 September 1814 – 11 February 1875) was a Prussian diplomat, politician, and a leading member of the Centre Party.

== Early life ==
Savigny was born in Berlin on 19 September 1814. His father was the jurist Friedrich Carl von Savigny, who was then privy councillor of the court of appeals, member of the Prussian council of State, and professor at the University of Berlin, and his mother was Kunigunde Brentano, sister of the poet Clemens Brentano. His father was a Protestant, but his mother was a Catholic, and their children were raised Catholic.

Karl Friedrich was first taught at home, then attended the French Gymnasium at Berlin, the Collegium Romanum at Rome, and the Collegium Sebastianum at Naples. He studied law at Berlin, Munich, and Paris.

== Career ==
In 1836 he became an auscultator at Berlin; in 1837 he was a referendar in the court at Aachen, in 1840 secretary of legation at London and Dresden, in 1842 at Lisbon, in 1848 at London. In 1849 he was Councillor of legations and member of the Ministry of Foreign Affairs, and in 1850 ambassador at Karlsruhe (the capital of the Grand Duchy of Baden). While there he was able to win over the Baden Government for the Prussian policy, and, as Bismarck testified, "by cautious and tactful bearing to win a commanding position at Karlsruhe for the Prussian government."

From 1859 Karl Friedrich was Prussian ambassador at Dresden (to the Kingdom of Saxony), from 1862 at Brussels (to Belgium), and from 1864 he was minister with full powers at the Diet of the German Confederation at Frankfurt. In 1866 he offered at the Diet the Prussian motion for the reform of the German Confederation, and when it was rejected on 14 June 1866, he declared the withdrawal of Prussia, after which the Austro-Prussian War began. Later in connection with Bismarck he was plenipotentiary in making a treaty of peace with the states of southern Germany and Saxony. He was the presiding officer of the government conferences for the drafting of a constitution for the North German Confederation, and was a plenipotentiary at the Reichstag which decided the constitution.

He partially retired in 1868 before fully retiring from government positions in 1871 in order to become one of the parliamentary leaders of the Catholics. From 1867 he was a member of the House of Representatives of the Prussian Diet, from 1868 a member of the Lower House of the Diet of the North German Confederation, and later of the German Reichstag, or Parliament of the German Empire. In 1871 he took part in the founding of the Centre Party. He was not particularly distinguished as a speaker, but his knowledge, distinguished personality, and connections were of much benefit to the Catholic cause. He believed that "laws are not made but found".

== Personal life ==
In Boitzenburg in 1853 Savigny was married to Countess Freda Sophie Karoline Marie von Arnim-Boitzenburg, a daughter of Count Adolf Heinrich von Arnim-Boitzenburg, the 1st Minister President of Prussia (under King Frederick William IV) and Countess Anna Caroline von der Schulenburg. Among her siblings were Count Adolf von Arnim-Boitzenburg, governor of Silesia who was president of the Reichstag in 1880. Together, they were the parents of four sons and five daughters, including:

- Leo von Savigny (1863–1910), professor of law in Marburg and Münster; he married Baroness Maria von Amelunxen.
- Karl von Savigny (1855–1928), member of the Prussian House of Representatives and the Reichstag; he married his brother's widow, Baroness Maria von Amelunxen in 1912.
- Adolf von Savigny (1857–1920), Prussian court trainee.
- Elisabeth von Savigny (1856–1902), who married Baron Rudolf von Buol-Berenberg, President of the Reichstag.
- Maria Freda von Savigny (1859–1890), Sister of Mercy of St. Borromeo in Osnabrück.
- Friedrich von Savigny (1861–1891)
- Helene von Savigny (1864–1908), nun of the Sacré Coeur Graz, superior in Graz.
- Hedwig von Savigny (1867–1898), nun of the Sacré Coeur Graz.
- Josepha von Savigny (1874–1945), who married Baron Adolf von Schönberg.

Savigny died in Frankfurt on 11 February 1875.
