= Hans zu Hohenlohe-Öhringen =

German nobleman and diplomat

Prince Hans 6th Prince of Hohenlohe-Öhringen 3rd Duke of Ujest

Prussian Envoy to Saxony
- In office 1906–1911
- Preceded by: Carl August von Dönhoff
- Succeeded by: Vacant

Personal details
- Born: Hans Heinrich Georg Herzog zu Hohenlohe-Oehringen; 24 April 1858 Sławięcice Palace, Slawentzitz
- Died: 24 April 1945 (aged 87) Oppurg, Thuringia
- Spouse: Princess Olga zu Hohenlohe-Öhringen (m. 1889; died 1935)
- Children: 4
- Parent(s): Hugo zu Hohenlohe-Öhringen; Pauline zu Fürstenberg

Hans Heinrich Georg Herzog, Prince of Hohenlohe-Oehringen, Duke of Ujest (24 April 1858 – 24 April 1945) was a German nobleman and diplomat.

== Early life ==
A hereditary prince of the House of Hohenlohe, he was born at Sławięcice Palace in Slawentzitz in the Kingdom of Prussia on 24 April 1858. He was a younger son of Prince Hugo zu Hohenlohe-Öhringen and Princess Pauline zu Fürstenberg.

His maternal grandparents were Amalie of Baden (daughter of Charles Frederick, the Margrave, Elector and Grand Duke of Baden) and Charles Egon II, Prince of Fürstenberg (the last sovereign prince of Furstenburg). His paternal grandparents were August, Prince of Hohenlohe-Öhringen and Louise of Württemberg (a daughter of Princess Louise of Stolberg-Gedern and Duke Eugen of Württemberg).

== Career ==
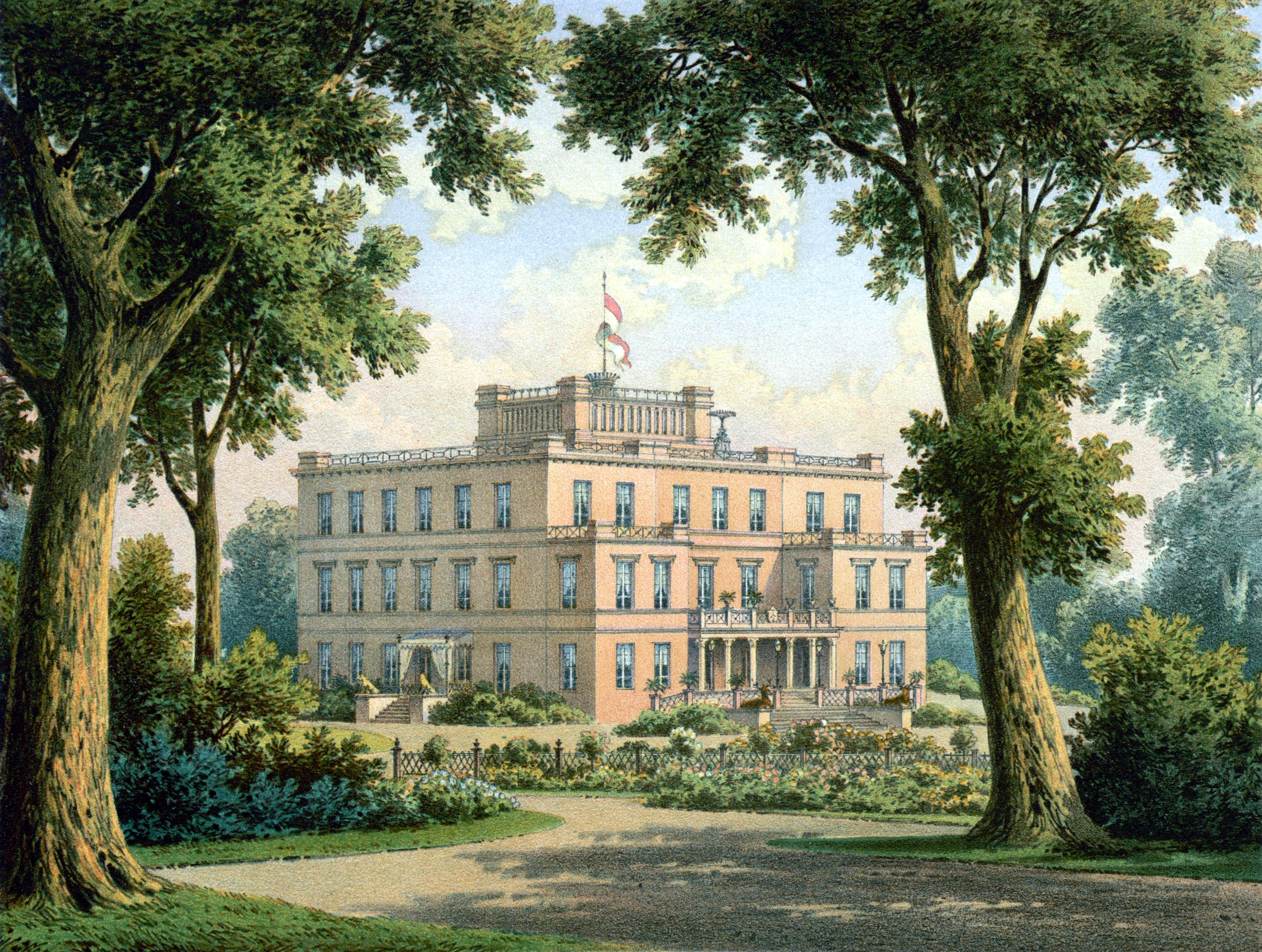
Sławięcice Palace by Alexander Duncker, c. 1860

From 1906 to 1911, he served as the Prussian Envoy to the Kingdom of Saxony in Dresden.

Upon their father's death in 1897, his elder brother, Prince Christian, became the 5th Prince of Hohenlohe-Öhringen and 2nd Duke of Ujest, and inheriting the family estates. After his brother's death in Somogyszob in 1926 without issue, Prince Hans became the 6th Prince of Hohenlohe-Öhringen and 3rd Duke of Ujust and inherited the family estates including Sławięcice Palace (in Upper Silesia), Oppurg Castle (in Thuringia), Neuenstein Castle (in Neuenstein), Öhringen Castle (in Öhringen), and the Hohenlohe Hunting Lodge (in Javorina, Slovakia which was sold to the Czechoslovak Republic in 1935). He was the last Hohenlohe to own Sławięcice Palace before they had to abandon it during World War II for their summer palace in Oppurg and later to Neuenstein in Hohenlohe. The Sławięcice palace was severely damaged by the Red Army in January 1945 and the remaining structure burned down in 1948.

== Personal life ==
On 29 April 1889, Prince Hans was married in Bamberg to his first cousin, Princess Gertrude Auguste Mathilde Olga zu Hohenlohe-Öhringen (Heidelberg, 3 April 1862 – Breslau, 21 April 1935), a daughter of his father's younger brother Prince Felix Eugen Wilhelm zu Hohenlohe-Öhringen and Princess Alexandrine von Hanau-Hořowitz, Countess of Schaumburg (a daughter of Gertrude von Hanau and Frederick William, Elector of Hesse). They were the parents of:

- Hugo Felix August zu Hohenlohe-Oehringen (1890–1962), who married Ursula von Zedlitz, a daughter of Konstantin von Zedlitz, in 1928. They divorced in 1930 and he married Valerie von Carstanjen, a daughter of Wilhelm Adolf Robert von Carstanjen, in 1930. They divorced in 1946 and he married Erika Himmelein, daughter of Friedrich Konrad Himmelein, in 1948.
- Alexandrine Marie Margarethe zu Hohenlohe-Oehringen (1891–1959), who died unmarried.
- Friedrich Karl Kraft zu Hohenlohe-Oehringen (1892–1965), a twin who married Nina Chischina, daughter of Ilja Chischine, the former wife of his cousin, Prince Waldemar Hugo Hermann Maximilian zu Hohenlohe-Oehringen, in 1948.
- Dorothea zu Hohenlohe-Oehringen (1892–1931) a twin who died unmarried.

Prince Hans died on 24 April 1945 in Oppurg, Thuringia.

== Ancestry ==
Ancestors of Hans zu Hohenlohe-Öhringen

8. Friedrich Ludwig, Prince of Hohenlohe-Ingelfingen
4. August, 3rd Prince of Hohenlohe-Öhringen
9. Countess Amalie of Hoym
2. Hugo, 4th Prince of Hohenlohe-Öhringen, 1st Duke of Ujest
10. Duke Eugen of Württemberg
5. Duchess Louise of Württemberg
11. Princess Louise of Stolberg-Gedern
1. Hans, 6th Prince of Hohenlohe-Öhringen, 3rd Duke of Ujest
12. Charles Aloys, Prince of Fürstenberg
6. Charles Egon II, Prince of Fürstenberg
13. Princess Elisabeth of Thurn and Taxis
3. Princess Pauline of Fürstenberg
14. Charles Frederick, Grand Duke of Baden
7. Princess Amalie of Baden
15. Baroness Caroline Louise Geyer of Geyersberg

Hans, 6th Prince of Hohenlohe-Öhringen, 3rd Duke of Ujest House of Hohenlohe-Öhringen Cadet branch of the House of Hohenlohe Born: 24 April 1858 Died: 24 April 1945
Titles in pretence
Preceded by Christian, 5th Prince of Hohenlohe-Öhringen, 2nd Duke of Ujest	— TITULAR — Prince of Hohenlohe-Öhringen; 14 May 1926 – 24 April 1945	Succeeded by August, 7th Prince of Hohenlohe-Öhringen, 4th Duke of Ujest
Preceded by Christian, 5th Prince of Hohenlohe-Öhringen, 2nd Duke of Ujest	— TITULAR — Duke of Ujest; 14 May 1926 – 24 April 1945	Succeeded by August, 7th Prince of Hohenlohe-Öhringen, 4th Duke of Ujest
