= Adolf Heinrich von Arnim-Boitzenburg =

German politician (1803–1868)

Graf Adolf Heinrich von Arnim-Boitzenburg
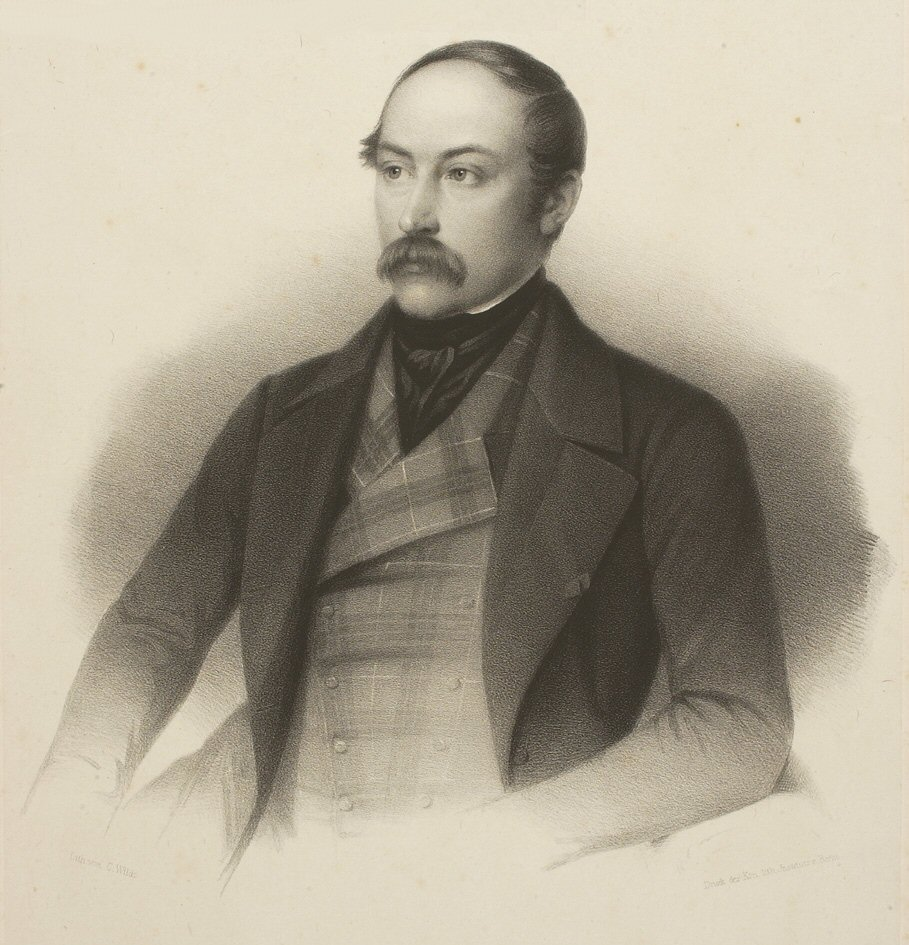

1st Minister President of Prussia
- In office 19 March – 29 March 1848
- Monarch: Frederick William IV
- Preceded by: Office established
- Succeeded by: Gottfried Ludolf Camphausen

Interior Minister of Prussia
- In office 1842–1845
- Preceded by: Gustav Adolf Rochus von Rochow
- Succeeded by: Ernst von Bodelschwingh-Velmede

Foreign Minister of Prussia
- In office 19 March – 21 March 1848
- Preceded by: Karl Ernst Wilhelm von Canitz und Dallwitz
- Succeeded by: Heinrich Alexander von Arnim

Personal details
- Born: 10 April 1803; Berlin, Prussia
- Died: 8 January 1868 (aged 64); Boitzenburg Castle, Brandenburg, Prussia
- Political party: None
- Spouse: Countess Anna Caroline von der Schulenburg
- Relations: Friedrich Wilhelm von Arnim-Boitzenburg (grandfather); Johann Ludwig von Wallmoden-Gimborn (grandfather)
- Parent(s): Friedrich Abraham Wilhelm von Arnim; Georgine von Wallmoden-Grimborn

Adolf Heinrich Graf von Arnim-Boitzenburg (10 April 1803 – 8 January 1868) was a German statesman. He served as the first Minister-President of Prussia for ten days during the Revolution of 1848.

== Early life ==
Arnim was born in the Prussian capital Berlin, the son of envoy Friedrich Abraham Wilhelm von Arnim (1767–1812) and his wife Georgine von Wallmoden-Grimborn (1770–1859), a daughter of the Hanoverian field marshal and art collector Johann Ludwig von Wallmoden-Gimborn and thereby presumably a granddaughter of King George II of Great Britain. His parents divorced when he was three years old.

Having finished his studies in Berlin and Göttingen in 1825, he joined the Prussian Guards Uhlans regiment as a One-year volunteer and afterwards entered civil service at the Kammergericht.

== Career ==
In 1830, he was appointed Landrat official in the Uckermark district. In 1833, he became Vice-president of the Pomeranian Stralsund government region. One year later, he assumed the position of President in the Aix-la-Chapelle (Aachen) region, from 1838 in Merseburg, Saxony. In 1840 he became governor (Oberpräsident) of the Grand Duchy of Posen.

In 1842 Arnim was called back to Berlin to be appointed Prussian State Minister of the Interior. Nevertheless, he resigned in 1845 because his plans for a constitution for Prussia were at odds with King Frederick William IV's romantic ideals. When the March Revolution broke out in 1848, his services were again in demand. From 19 March 1848, he acted as the first Prussian Minister-President and Foreign Minister. However, he again resigned within a few days after the king chose to place himself at the head of the national movement.

A member of the Provincial Brandenburg Landtag assembly since 1839, Arnim from 18 May to 10 June 1848 was a representative for Prenzlau in the Frankfurt Parliament and also was a member of the short-lived Erfurt Union Parliament in 1850. He belonged to the newly established Prussian House of Representatives from 1849 and later joined the House of Lords chamber of the Prussian Parliament.

Arnim is known to this day for his remarks as Prussian Interior Minister during the Vormärz era concerning Heinrich Heine's poem The Silesian Weavers. The verses were published in the Vorwärts! weekly newspaper after an 1844 riot in the Province of Silesia, which later also inspired the drama The Weavers by Gerhart Hauptmann. In a report to King Frederick William IV he described Heine's poetry as "an address to the poor amongst the populace, held in an inflammatory tone and filled with criminal utterances" ("eine in aufrührerischem Ton gehaltene und mit verbrecherischen Äußerungen angefüllte Ansprache an die Armen im Volke"). Subsequently, the Royal Prussian Kammergericht banned the poem, which in 1846 led to a prison sentence for a person who had dared to publicly recite it.

== Personal life ==
He married Countess Anna Caroline von der Schulenburg (1804–1886), a daughter of Count Hans Günther Werner von der Schulenburg. One of his children was politician Adolf von Arnim-Boitzenburg, who was in 1880 for a short time president of German Reichstag.

Arnim died on 8 January 1868 at his Boitzenburg estate.

== See also ==
- Arnim-Boitzenburg cabinet
