= Adolph Friedrich von der Schulenburg =

Prussian Lieutenant General and confidant of King Frederick William I

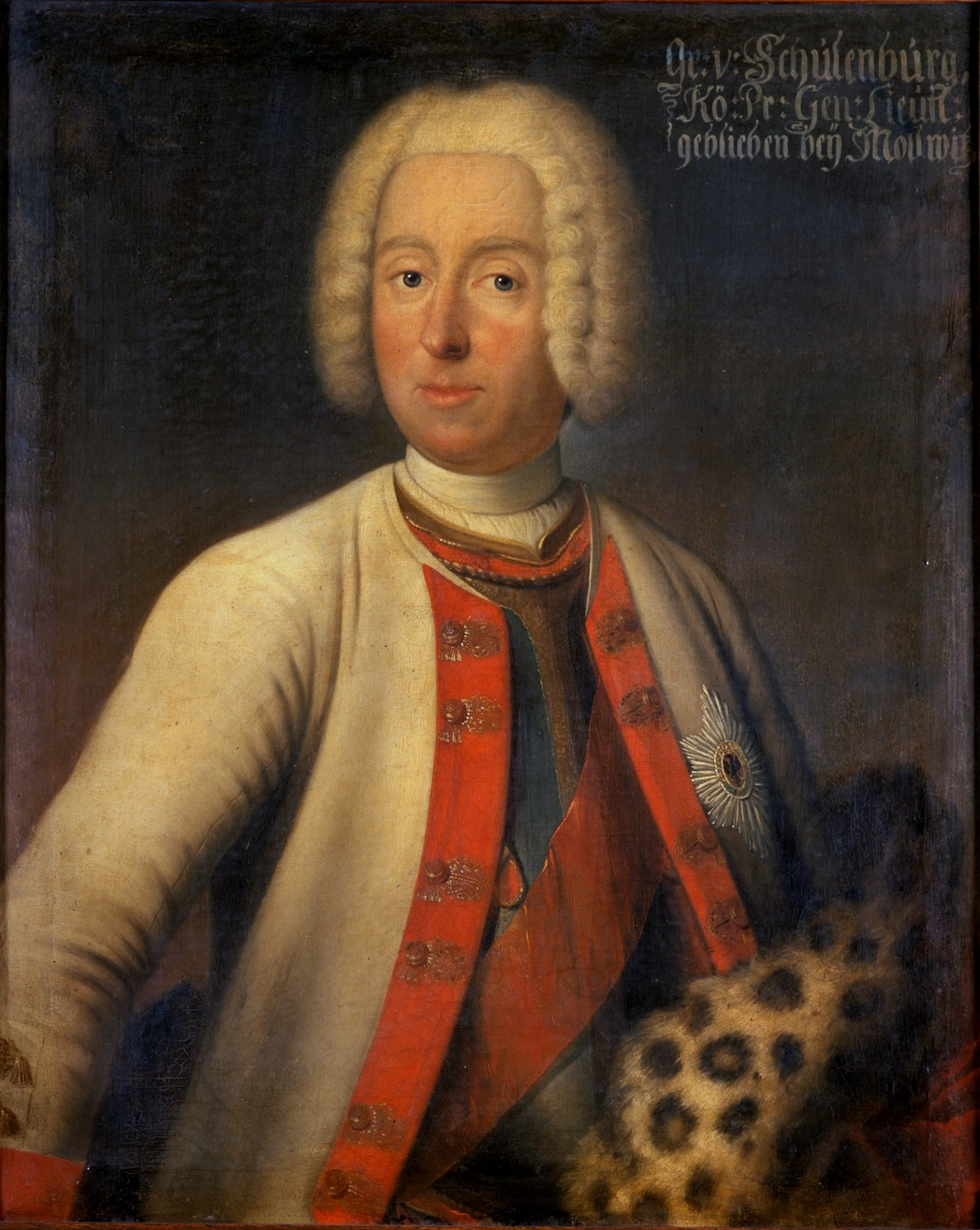
- Portrait of Count von Schulenburg, by G. v. Bern, c. 1740–1760
- Born: 8 December 1685; Wolfenbüttel, Principality of Brunswick-Wolfenbüttel
- Died: 10 April 1741 (aged 55); Małujowice, Poland
- Spouse: Anna Adelheit Catharina von Bartensleben (m. 1718; died 1741)
- Children: 15
- Parent(s): Friedrich Achaz von der Schulenburg; Margarethe Gertrud von der Schulenburg

Count Adolph Friedrich von der Schulenburg (8 December 1685 – 10 April 1741) was a Prussian Lieutenant General and confidant of King Frederick William I who fell in the Battle of Mollwitz during the First Silesian War.

== Early life ==
Schulenburg was born 8 December 1685 in Wolfenbüttel in the Principality of Brunswick-Wolfenbüttel. He was the son of Friedrich Achaz von der Schulenburg (1647–1701), a high-ranking court official of the Dukes of Brunswick, and Margarethe Gertrud von der Schulenburg (1659–1697), sister of the Venetian field marshal Count Matthias Johann von der Schulenburg.
Imperial General Ludwig von Schulenburg-Oeynhausen was his cousin.

In 1701, at the age of 16, he entered the Knights' Academy in Lüneburg and then studied for three years in Utrecht.

== Career ==
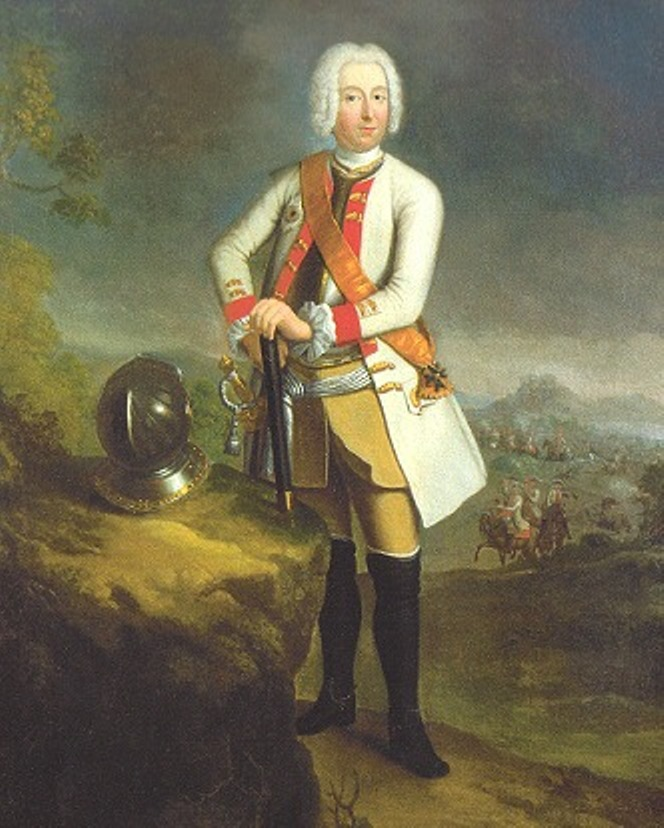
Portrait of Schulenburg, 18th century

In 1705, he began his military career in the Hanoverian Army, fighting in the Battle of Ramillies on 23 May 1706 during the War of the Spanish Succession in the ranks of the Regiment of his uncle, General Alexander von der Schulenburg. When peace appeared imminent in 1713, he transferred into Prussian service. From 1724 he commanded a Prussian dragoon regiment in Landsberg an der Warthe, which was later named after him. On 7 December 1728, Schulenburg and his brother Christian Günther von der Schulenburg received the hereditary nobility title of Imperial Count from Emperor Charles VI.

Schulenburg gained the personal trust of King Frederick William I of Prussia. Through delicate missions on behalf of the ruler, he became a close advisor, experienced general and accomplished diplomat. During the conflict between the King and his eldest surviving son and heir, Frederick II (later Frederick the Great), Schulenburg was temporarily tasked with supervising the unruly Crown Prince.

When the King died in 1740 and Frederick II came to power, the two conflicted Schulenburg's dragoon regiment was personally demoted by the new King. Nevertheless, the new ruler promoted him to Lieutenant general in 1740 and awarded him the Order of the Black Eagle, the highest order of chivalry in the Kingdom of Prussia. Because of the ongoing conflict between Schulenburg and the King, he asked to leave military service. Frederick II, however, refused and sent him to fight in the First Silesian War in 1741 where Schulenburg was killed on 10 April 1741 at the Battle of Mollwitz in southern Poland.

== Personal life ==
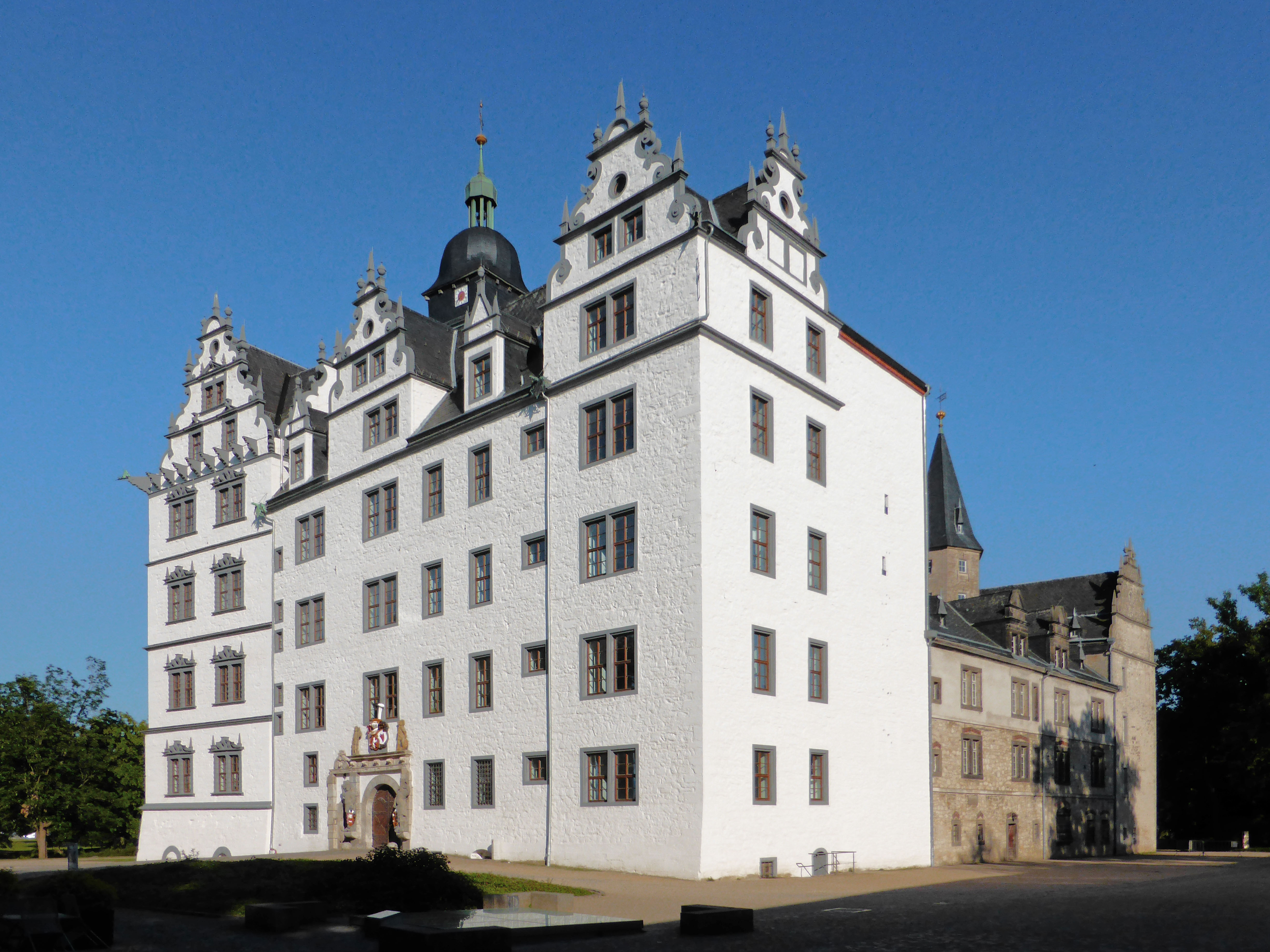
Wolfsburg Castle

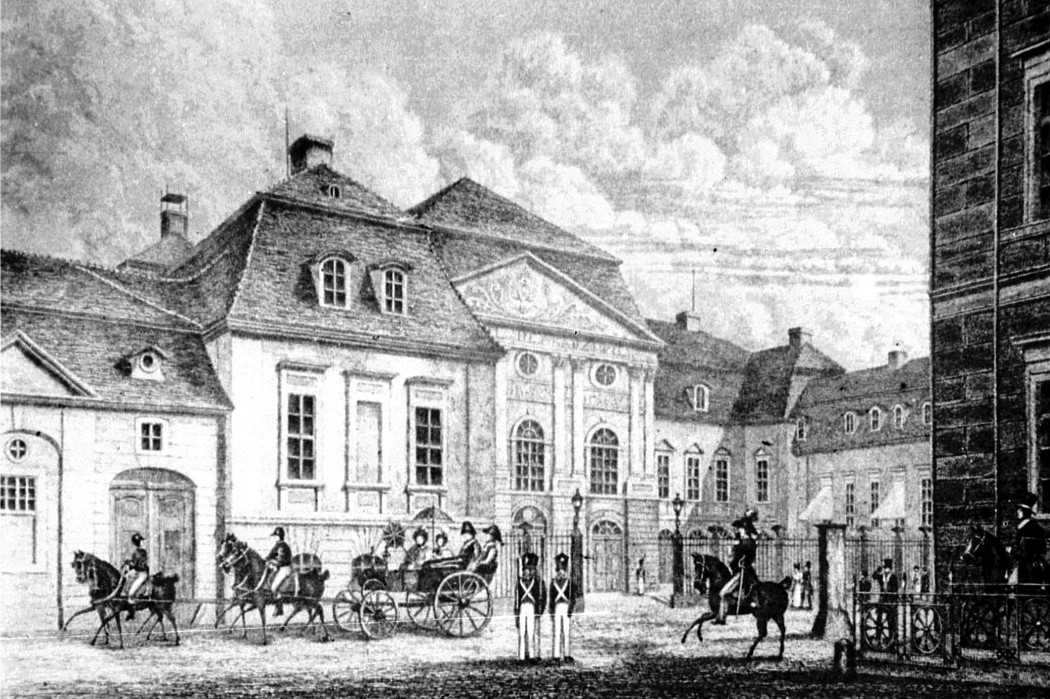
The Schulenburg Palace in Berlin, later the Reich Chancellery at Wilhelmstraße 77, c. 1830

In 1718 Schulenburg married Anna Adelheit Catharina von Bartensleben, the daughter of Anna Elisabeth von Bodenhausen and Gebhard Werner von Bartensleben, the owner of the manors Beetzendorf, Detzel, Klosterrode, Osterwohle and Ramstedt. Upon the death of her father in 1742, Anna was the sole heir to the von Bartensleben estate, including Wolfsburg Castle. Together, they were the parents of fifteen children, three of whom died young, including:

- Anna Elisabeth von der Schulenburg (1720–1741), who married Abraham Wilhelm von Arnim-Boitzenburg, son of Georg Dietloff von Arnim-Boitzenburg, (Note: Georg Dietloff von Arnim-Boitzenburg (1679–1753) was Chief Minister of the Kingdom of Prussia from 1749 to 1753.) in 1738.
- Magarethe Luise von der Schulenburg (1721–1784), who married Abraham Friedrich von Arnim-Boitzenburg, son of Hans Abraham von Arnim, in 1740.
- Gebhard Werner von der Schulenburg (1722–1788), who married Sophie Charlotte von Veltheim, sister of August Ferdinand von Veltheim, in 1757.
- Caroline Wilhelmine von der Schulenburg (1724–1782), who married Baron Ludwig Schenk von Wintersted, in 1748.
- Sophie Frederike Charlotte von der Schulenburg (1725–1772), who married her first cousin, Georg Ludwig I von der Schulenburg-Hehlen, a son of Christian Günther von der Schulenburg, in 1754.
- Maria Albertine von der Schulenburg (1726–1793), who married Georg Heinrich von Arnim, son of Hans Abraham von Arnim, in 1746.
- Friedrich August von der Schulenburg (1727–1797), who married Henriette Sophia von der Schulenburg, a daughter of Levin Friedrich III von der Schulenburg, in 1757.
- Christina Amalie von der Schulenburg (b. 1732), who married Friedrich Wilhelm von Witzleben in 1753.
- Helena von der Schulenburg (1734–1776), who married Emmerich Otto August von Estorff in 1761.
- Johanna Adelheid von der Schulenburg (1735–1805), who married Gotthelf Dietrich von Ende.
- Achatius Wilhelm von der Schulenburg (1738–1808), who married Dorothea Christina Schenk von Flechtingen in 1762.
- Albrecht Ludwig von der Schulenburg (1741–1784), who married Auguste Friederike von Stammer, a daughter of Hieronymus Friedrich von Stammer, (Note: Hieronymus Friedrich von Stammer (1712–1777) was Conference Minister of Electoral Saxony and Warden of Upper Lusatia.), in 1771.

King Frederick William I gave him a piece of land near the Tiergarten in Berlin and financed the construction of the Schulenburg Palace there between 1736 and 1739. The building served as the family's Berlin town house. It was later acquired by Prince Antoni Radziwiłł before becoming the Reich Chancellery of Otto von Bismarck.

After his death on 10 April 1741 in Małujowice, he was buried in the church in Beetzendorf, the ancestral home of the Schulenburg family. His children founded the Wolfsburg and Klosterrode branches of the von der Schulenburg noble family.

=== Descendants ===
Through his youngest son Albrecht, he was posthumously a grandfather of diplomat Friedrich Albrecht von der Schulenburg.
