= List of ambassadors of Prussia to Saxony =

The following is a partial list of Prussian envoys to the Electorate of Saxony, Kingdom of Saxony and Free State of Saxony.

== History ==
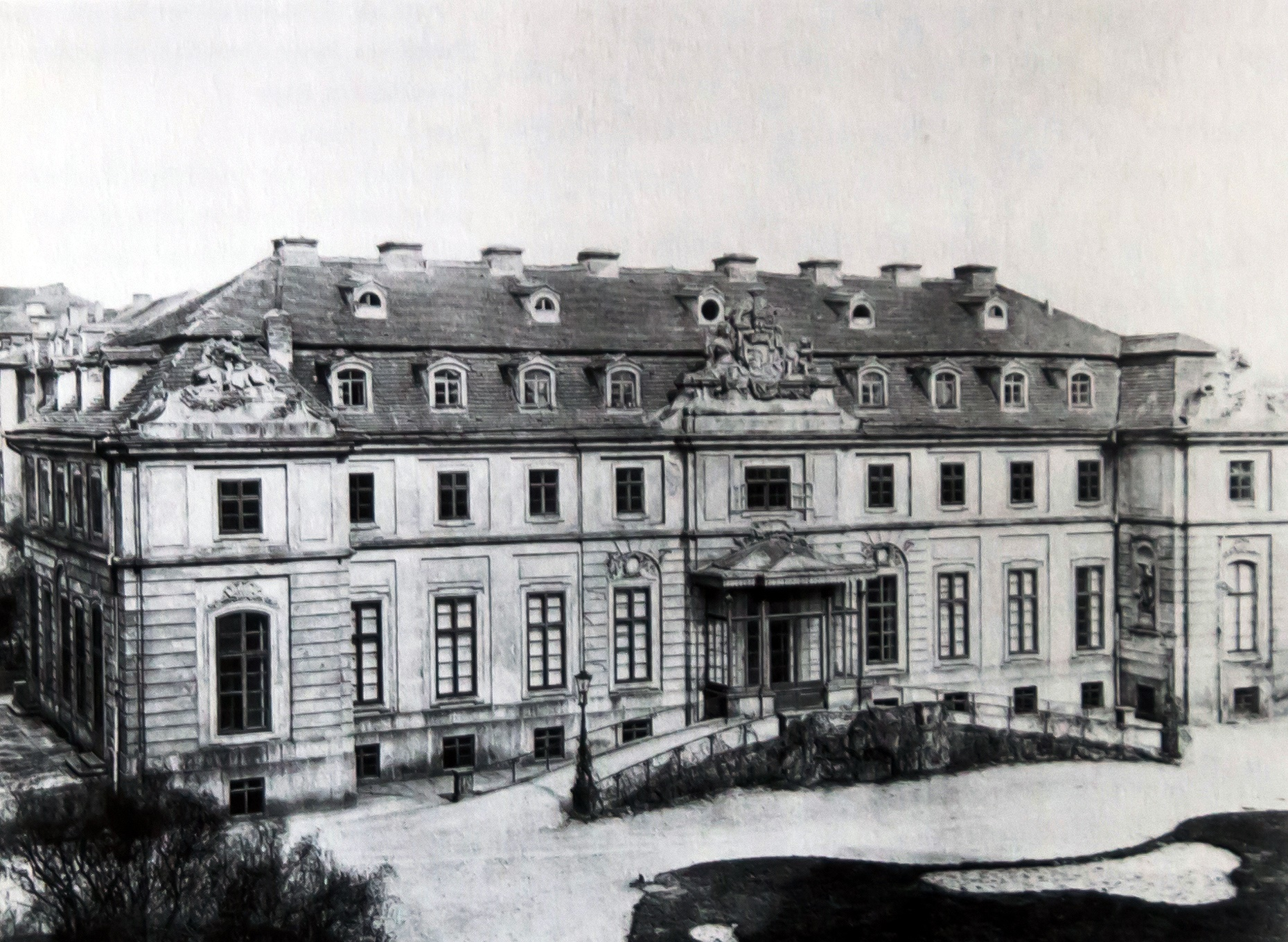
Moszinska Palace, c. 1870

Since the late Middle Ages, family ties established through marriage between the Wettin and Hohenzollern dynasties, as well as an inheritance bond concluded in 1457 (and renewed several times in the 16th century), have determined Brandenburg-Saxon relations. From the 17th century onwards, Prussian-Saxon relations were characterized by the increase in political power of Prussia and the parallel loss of power in Saxony. From 1742, Prussia set up a permanent embassy in Dresden.

Major conflicts with a temporary break in diplomatic relations were the First Silesian War (from 1740 to 1742) and Second Silesian War (from 1745 to 1746), the Seven Years' War (from 1756 to 1763) and the Austro-Prussian War (in 1866). With the creation of the Prussian Foreign Ministry in 1808, there was a structural reorganization of the Prussian embassy system. During the War of the Sixth Coalition (from 1813 to 1815) there was a withdrawal of the diplomatic corps, but no formal break in relations.

From the middle of the 19th century, the Prussian Embassy was located in the Moszinska Palace (German: Palais Moszczyńska, Mosczinskystrasse 5, in today's Großer Garten district. After the founding of the German Empire in 1871, the embassy became largely insignificant before it was dissolved in 1924.

== Heads of mission ==
1650: Establishment of diplomatic relations

=== Envoy to the Electorate of Saxony ===
(...)

- 1721 Kurt Christoph von Schwerin
- 1721–1726: Franz Wilhelm von Happe (1687–1760)
- 1740 Christoph Heinrich von Ammon (1713–1783)

(...)

1742: Establishment of a permanent embassy

- 1742–1745: Otto Leopold von Beeß (1690–1761)

1745 to 1746: Interruption of relations

- 1746–1748: Joachim Wilhelm von Klinggräff (1692–1757)
- 1748–1750: Johann Ernst von Voß (1726–1793)
- 1750–1756: Hans Dietrich von Maltzahn

1757 to 1763: Interruption of relations during the Seven Years' War

- 1763–1765: Adolf Friedrich von Buch (1732–1811)
- 1765–1775: Adrian Heinrich von Borcke (1736–1791)
- 1775–1775: Joachim Erdmann von Arnim (1741–1804)
- 1775–1787: Philipp Karl von Alvensleben (1745–1802)
- 1787–1792: Karl Friedrich von Gessler (1753–1829)
- 1792–1794: Friedrich Abraham Wilhelm von Arnim (1767–1812)
- 1795–1806: Carl Christian von Brockhausen (1767–1829)

=== Envoys to the Kingdom of Saxony ===
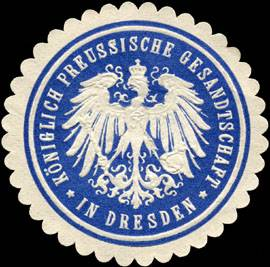
Seal of the Royal Prussian Embassy

- 1807–c. 1810: Peter Lautier, chargé d'affaires
- c. 1810–1813: Karl Friedrich von Geßler (1753–1829)
- 1813–1816: Vacant
- 1816–1819: Johann Christian Magnus von Oelsen (1775–1848)
- 1819–1848: Johann Ludwig von Jordan (1773–1848)
- 1848–1850: Julius von Canitz und Dallwitz (1815–1894), chargé d'affaires
- 1850–1852: Ferdinand von Galen (1803–1881)
- 1852–1852: von der Schulenburg
- 1853–1859: Heinrich Alexander von Redern (1804–1888)
- 1859–1859: Eberhard zu Solms-Sonnenwalde (1825–1912)
- 1859–1863: Karl Friedrich von Savigny (1814–1875)
- 1863–1863: von Gundlach
- 1863–1864: Otto Carl Josias von Rantzau (1809–1864)
- 1864–1864: von Buddenbruck
- 1864–1866: Gustav von Schulenburg-Priemern

1866: Interruption of relations between June and October

- 1866–1867: von Landsberg-Steinfurt
- 1867–1873: Friedrich von Eichmann (1826–1875)
- 1873–1878: Eberhard zu Solms-Sonnenwalde (1825–1912)
- 1878–1879: Otto von Dönhoff
- 1879–1906: Carl August von Dönhoff (1833–1906)
- 1906–1911: Prince Hans zu Hohenlohe-Öhringen (1858–1945)
- 1911–1912: Vacant
- 1912–1914: Alfred von Bülow (1851–1916)
- 1914–1919: Ulrich Karl Wilhelm von Schwerin (1864–1930)

=== Envoys to the Free State of Saxony ===
- 1919–1920: Vacant
- 1920–1922: Herbert von Berger (1881–1965)
- 1922–1924: Schellen, chargé d'affaires

1924: Abolition of the embassy on March 31st

== See also ==
- Germany–Switzerland relations
