= Georg Dietloff von Arnim-Boitzenburg =

Prussian statesman (1679–1753)

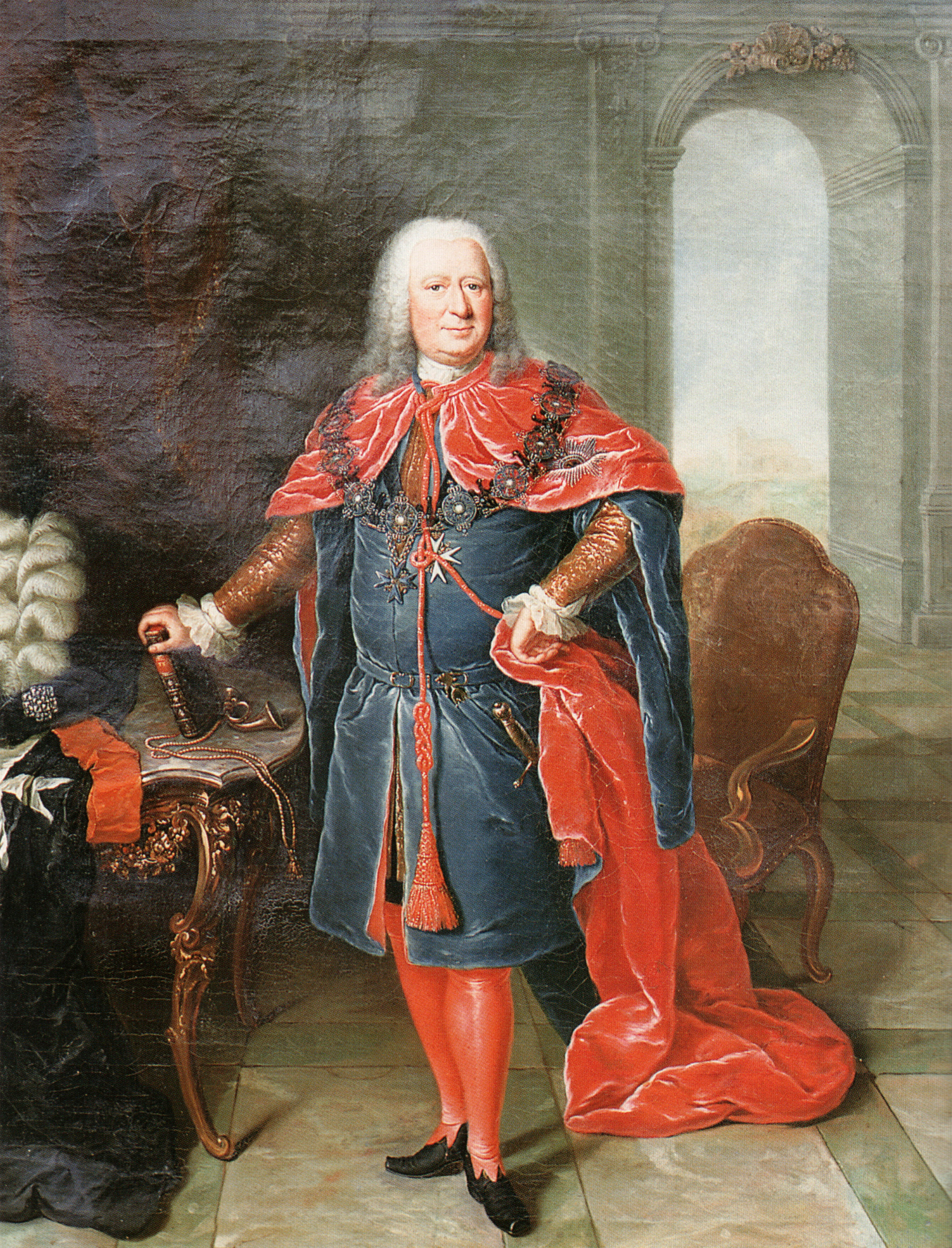
- Portrait of von Arnim, 1753

Chief Minister of the Kingdom of Prussia
- In office 1749–1753
- Monarch: Frederick the Great
- Preceded by: Heinrich von Podewils
- Succeeded by: Karl-Wilhelm Finck von Finckenstein

Personal details
- Born: 18 September 1679 Haus Necheln, Uckermark
- Died: 20 October 1753 (aged 74) Berlin, Kingdom of Prussia
- Spouse: Countess Dorothea Sabina von Schlieben (after 1705)
- Children: 10
- Education: University of Königsberg; University of Halle

Georg Dietloff von Arnim-Boitzenburg (18 September 1679 – 20 October 1753) was a Prussian statesman and senior minister under Frederick the Great.

== Early life ==
Arnim was born on 18 September 1679 in Haus Necheln in the Uckermark into the Prussian noble von Arnim family. He was the son of Euphemia von Blankenburg (1644–1712) and Jakob Dietlof von Arnim (1645–1689), a Brandenburg Colonel in the cavalry and Major General. Among his siblings were Jacob Vivigenz von Arnim (married to Philippine Elisabeth von Arnim), Hans Abraham von Arnim (married to Christiane Rosamude von der Asseburg), and Barbara Sabine von Arnim (wife of Karl Friedrich von Schlippenbach).

His paternal grandparents were Georg Wilhelm von Arnim and Barbara Sabine von Hohendorf. The Brandenburg Field Marshal Georg Abraham von Arnim was his uncle.

He attended the University of Königsberg in 1688, before he turned nine years old, then transferring to the University of Halle, where he studied until 1699. He then traveled through Germany, the Netherlands, France and Italy as part of his Grand Tour.

== Career ==
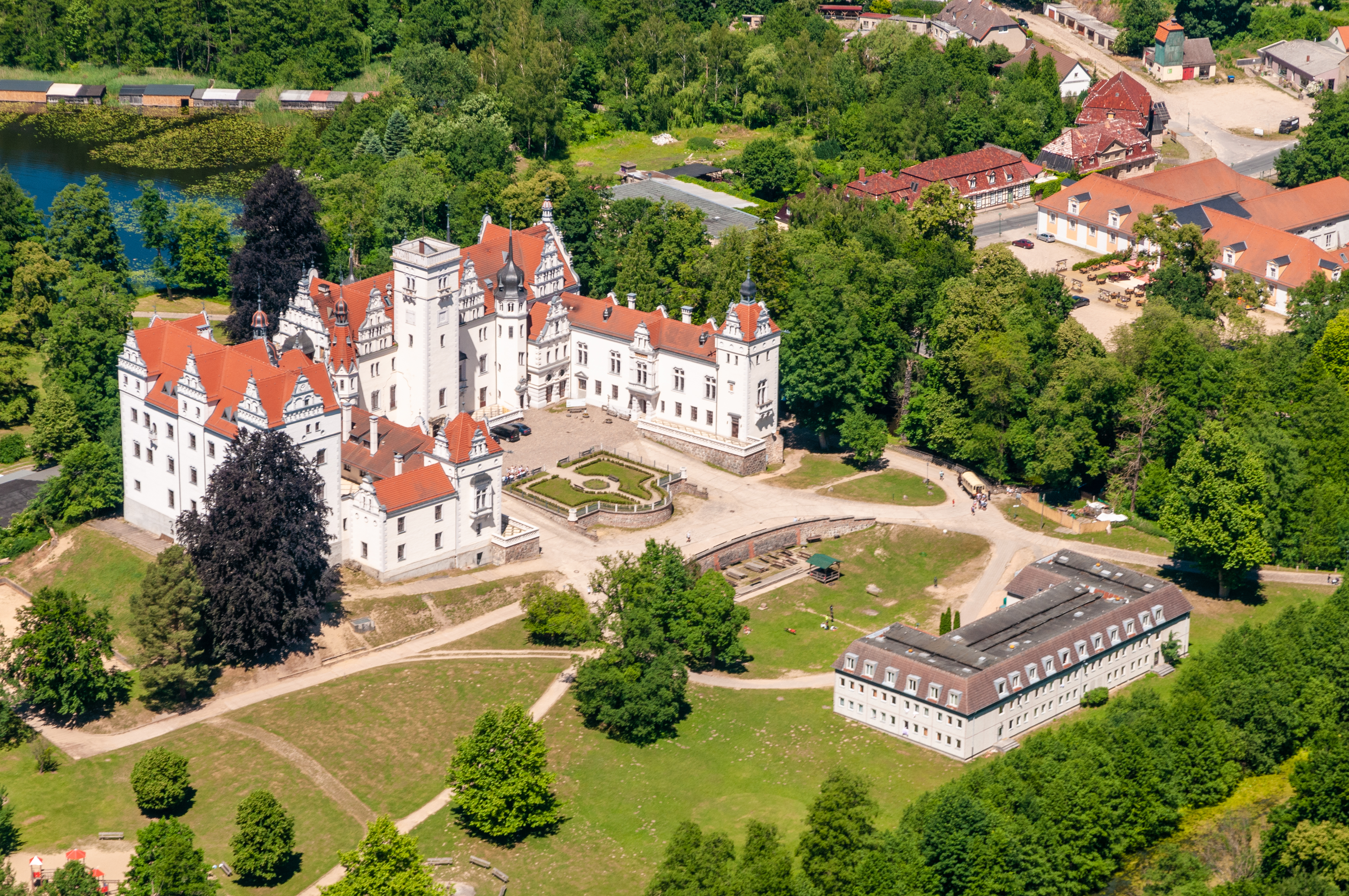
Boitzenburg Castle

In 1703, he became a chamberlain at the Brandenburg-Prussian court. He also served in the Prussian army and took part in the Battle of Höchstädt in 1704 where he was wounded.

In 1706, he was appointed governor of the Uckermark. In 1710, he managed to pay off the co-heirs of the Boitzenburger estate, redeem pledged property and become the sole owner of the villages of Kröchlendorff (today part of Nordwestuckermark), Milow, Kuhz, Wichmannsdorf, Kleinow and Falkenwalde. He had a manor built in the baroque style (Kröchlendorff Castle was later built there).

In 1712, Arnim became a secret judicial councilor and, in 1738, King Frederick William I appointed him president of the Oberappellationsgericht zu Berlin (later named the Prussian Supreme Tribunal) and the Ravensberg appeal court in Berlin. He also became feudal director, real privy councilor and Minister of State and War. Arnim also took over the Silesian Justice Department in 1743. Because he did not agree with extensive judicial reforms approved by Frederick II, he resigned in 1748. Afterwards he was director of the Brandenburg landscape. For his services in the civil service he was awarded the Order of the Black Eagle in December 1749. He was also the resident commander of the Order of St. John in Werben.

Frederick II brought him back into civil service in 1749 and appointed him directing minister and vice president of the General Directorate. He was also postmaster general and senior curator of the secondary schools. He was one of the most decisive representatives of corporate interests in the General Directorate.

At Boitzenburg Castle he laid the foundations for the castle library and had a side wing built specifically for it. Following the desertion of the surrounding area since the Thirty Years' War, Arnim brought in settlers as part of the internal colonization, contributing to the revitalization of area.

== Personal life ==
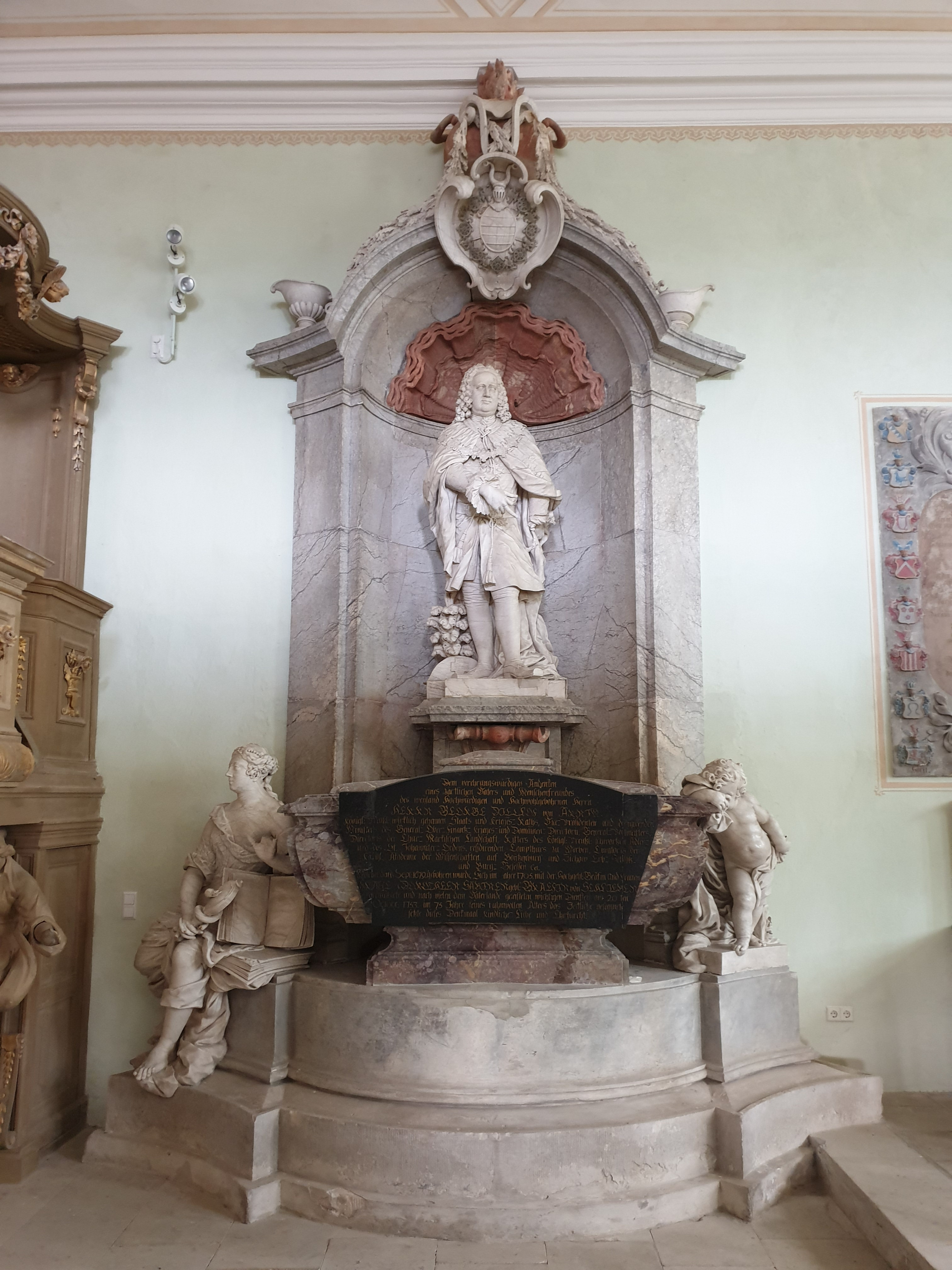
Monument for von Arnim-Boitzenburg in St. Mary's Church in Boitzenburg, 1753

In 1705, Arnim married Countess Dorothea Sabina von Schlieben, a daughter of Count Adam Georg von Schlieben and Charlotta von Fleming. Together, they had ten children, including:

- Charlotte Karoline Ernestine von Arnim (1710–1779), who married Hans Bogislav von Schwerin, son of Ulrich von Schwerin, Lord of Löwitz.
- Abraham Wilhelm von Arnim-Boitzenburg (1712–1761), who married Anna Elisabeth von der Schulenburg, eldest daughter of Adolph Friedrich von der Schulenburg, in 1738.
- Juliana Sophia von Arnim (1716–1721), who died young.
- Euphemia von Arnim (1717–1718), who died young.
- Hans Jürgen von Arnim (1720–1723), who died young.
- Christiana Helena von Arnim (1722–1729), who died young.

Arnim died on 20 October 1753 in Berlin and was buried in the St. Mary's Church in Boitzenburg, where a tomb commemorates him.

=== Descendants ===
Through his son Abraham, he was a grandfather of Friedrich Wilhelm von Arnim-Boitzenburg (1739–1801), the Prussian civil servant and Minister of State and War from 1786 to 1798 who was raised to hereditary Prussian count on 2 October 1786 by King Frederick William II.
