= Krosigk (surname) =

Krosigk is a German-language surname.

== People ==
- Adolph Wilhelm von Krosigk (1609–1657), German governor of Muenster
- Conrad of Krosigk (1162–1225), German prelate, crusader and monk
- Ernst-Anton von Krosigk (1898–1945), German Army general
- Lutz Graf Schwerin von Krosigk (1887–1977), German jurist and politician
- Wilhelm von Krosigk (1871–1953), German Navy captain
- Sidonie von Krosigk (1989), German actress

== See also ==
- Schwerin von Krosigk Cabinet
