= House of Wallmoden =

Wallmoden family coat of arms

The House of Wallmoden is a German noble family from the Diocese of Hildesheim in Lower Saxony. Their ancestral seat of Wallmoden is today a town in Goslar. Branches of the family still survive. As former reigning, elder line of the family belonged to High nobility.

== History ==
The family was already in existence in the second half of the 12th century. One of its first demonstrable members was Thedel von Wallmoden, named in documents from 1154 onwards. An Eschwin von Wallmoden was mentioned in 1181. The Knight Templar Aschwin von Wallmoden is mentioned in 1307, on the dissolution of the Templars by Pope Clement V, at which time the Heinde herrschaft was a fiefdom of the Bishop of Hildesheim. Through marriage and inheritances, the family was able to significantly extend its property and continued into the 18th century.

The marriage of Henning von Wallmoden (1335–1393) with Agnes von Hallermund led to the uniting of both the lordly families in Heinde.

Thedel von Wallmoden († 1529), Stadthauptmann of Goslar, was the origin of both family lines. The elder line or upper house included Johan and his mother Amalie. In 1782 this line acquired from the princedom of Schwarzenberg the Reichsherrschaft Gimborn in Westphalia and on 17 January 1783 was raised by Joseph II, Holy Roman Emperor to the name of Wallmoden-Gimborn and promoted to Reichsgraf. The family ruled over Lordship of Gimborn-Neustadt, which was mediatised by the Grand Duchy of Berg in 1807. Of the first graf's descendants, the last was Graf Karl August Ludwig von Wallmoden-Gimborn, k.u.k. geheimer Rat, who died on 26 February 1883 in Prague.

The younger line or lower house has been able to retain the property of the Stammsitz, temporarily a 'Fideikommiss', right up to the present day. Also the first names Thedel has been kept up in the family to the present day.

== Coat of arms ==
The tribe crest shows three (2 over 1) black rams on an or ground. On the helmet are two rams' horns, with black and gold stripes. The crest running off the back of the helmet is also black and gold.

== Thedel von Wallmoden ==
In the 16th century Georg Thym wrote a variant of the 'Henry the Lion' saga under the title Thedel von Wallmoden (published by Paul Zimmermann in 1887).

== Notable members ==
- Amalie von Wallmoden; mistress of George II of Great Britain
- Johann Ludwig von Wallmoden-Gimborn; German lieutenant-general and art collector
- Ludwig von Wallmoden-Gimborn; Austrian General of the Cavalry

== Bibliography ==
- Otto Hupp: Münchener Kalender 1921. Buch u. Kunstdruckerei AG, München / Regensburg 1921.
- Genealogisches Handbuch des Adels, Band 45, 1969, Seite 316
- Genealogisches Handbuch des Adels, Band 134, 2004, Adelslexikon
