= Oppurg Castle =

Coordinates: 50°42′51″N 11°39′14″E

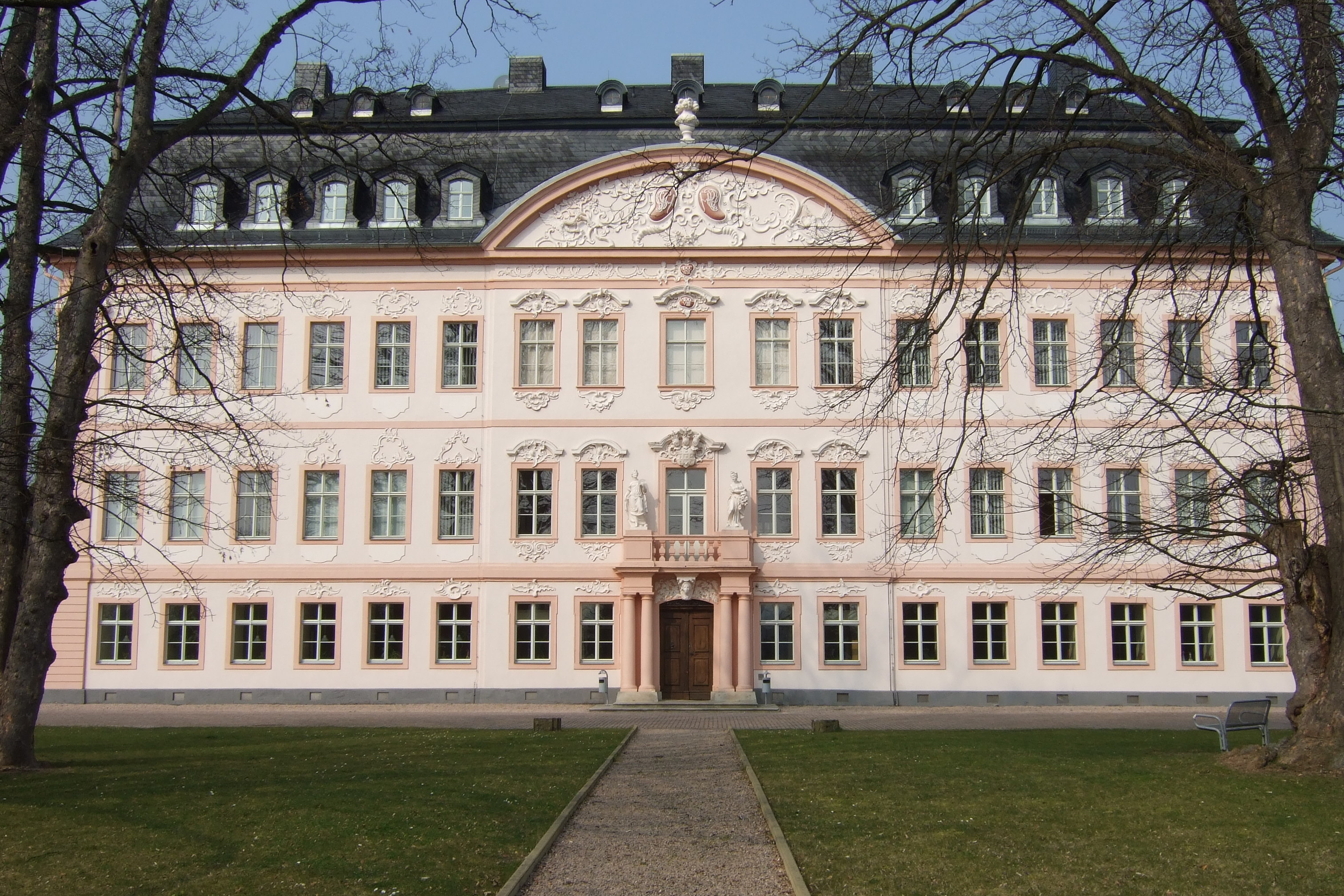
Oppurg Castle, 2007

Oppurg Castle (also known as Niederoppurg Castle) (German: Schloss Oppurg or Schloss Niederoppurg) is a baroque German castle in Oppurg near Pößneck in the Saale-Orla-Kreis district, in Thuringia, Germany.

== History ==
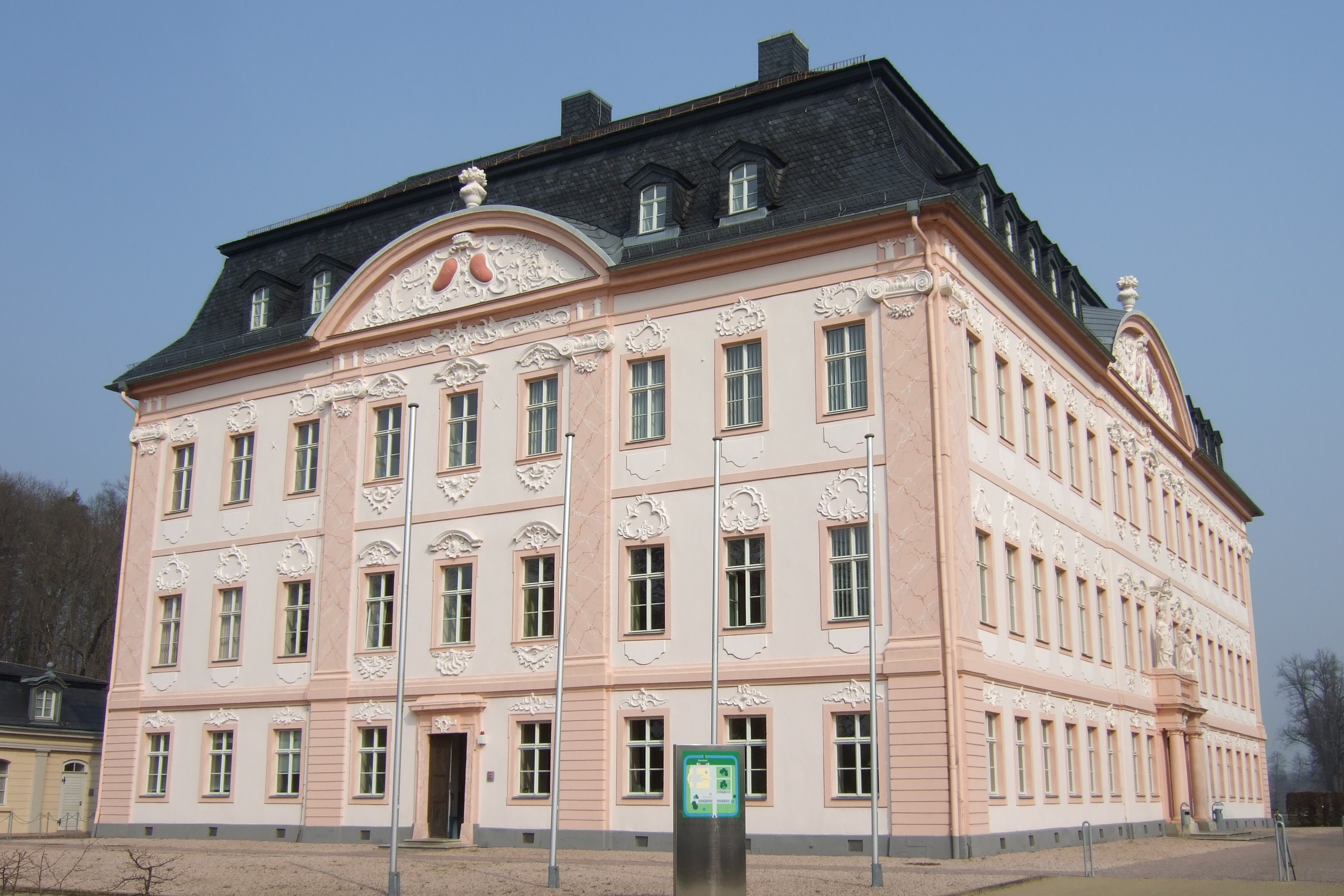
Southwest view

In the High Middle Ages, a fortress was built on the site of today's castle, which was demolished in 1705. The moated castle on the Orla River was first mentioned in 1354. Called Friedrichstein Castle, was built in 1074 by Margrave Wiprecht von Groitzsch and later expanded into a fortification by the Lord of Brandenstein from Ranis. Remains of the old castle can still be seen on the grounds today in the form of the vine-covered tower. A stately four-sided farm with a manor house, gatehouse and four barns was built between the 16th and 19th centuries. The massive two-story mansion on the south corner was built around 1680. Around 1755 the estate was fundamentally redesigned and the four-sided courtyard was closed.

=== Ownership from 1703 to 1945 ===
In 1703, after several changes of ownership, Oppurg came into the possession of Hans Haubold von Einsiedel's widow, Anna Sophia von Rumohr, whose father, C. von Rumohr, had Oppurg Castle built for her from 1705 to 1708 after the old castle was demolished. The baroque building is said to have once been equipped with 365 windows, 52 interior doors, 12 chimneys and 4 entrances. The floor plan of the castle is in the shape of an E, a reference to Amalia Sophie von Einsiedel.

In 1745, the castle was acquired by Count Julius Gebhard von Hoym, who had it redesigned into the current stucco façades made by Christian Wilhelm Müller. Hoym was the nephew of Count Adolf Magnus von Hoym, the chamber president of the Elector of Saxony Augustus II the Strong and husband of Anna Constantia von Brockdorff, before she became the king's mistress and made Countess of Cosel. In 1752 Hoym was also able to buy the five agricultural properties belonging to Oppurg. After Count Hoym's death, the estate came into Royal Hohenlohe ownership through his daughter, Countess Amalie von Hoym, who married the Friedrich Ludwig, Prince of Hohenlohe-Ingelfingen. It was used as a summer residence and hunting lodge until 1945.

=== Post World War II ===
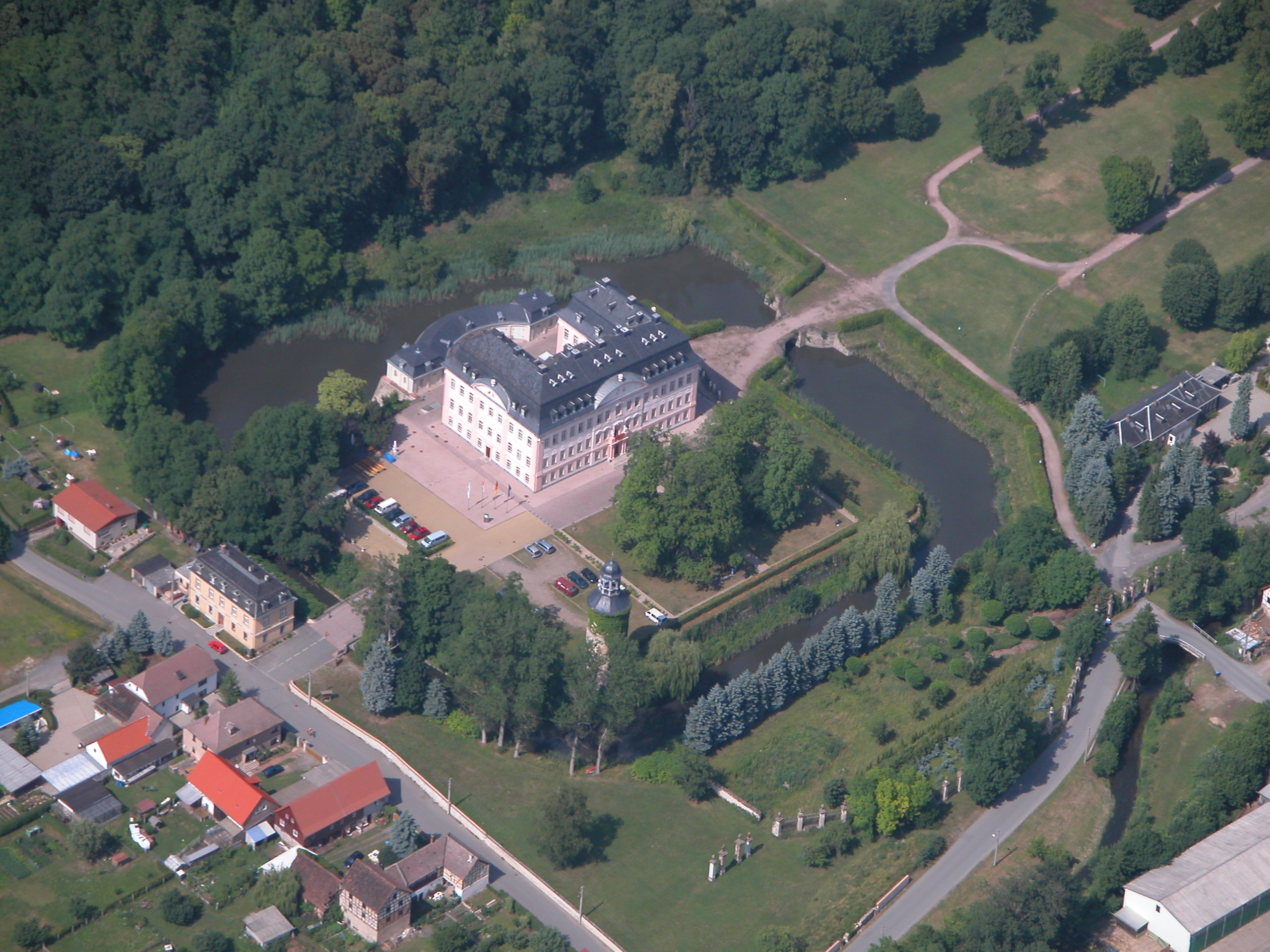
Aerial view, 2005

After 1945 the castle has been used for various purposes. The U.S. Army stayed in the building for a short time and before handing it over to the Soviet Army, who used it as a hospital. It later became an apprentice dormitory, a polytechnic high school, a kindergarten and a café.

From 1991 to 1993 it was completely renovated by the State of Thuringia and until 31 December 2017, was used by the Christian Youth Village Association of Germany as an education center, conference center and youth center for events. The Associated terminated its 66-year lease agreement with the State due to financial issues. The castle was then acquired by real estate developer Marcus Kemmer in 2021 and, in August 2022, a hotel and restaurant opened in the castle.

== Architecture ==
The castle consists of three wings: the main southern wing and the eastern and western secondary wings. On the castle grounds there is also a carriage house, a tower of the former Friedrichstein Castle, a moat surrounding the castle and, to the east of the house, a castle garden in the style of an English landscape park.

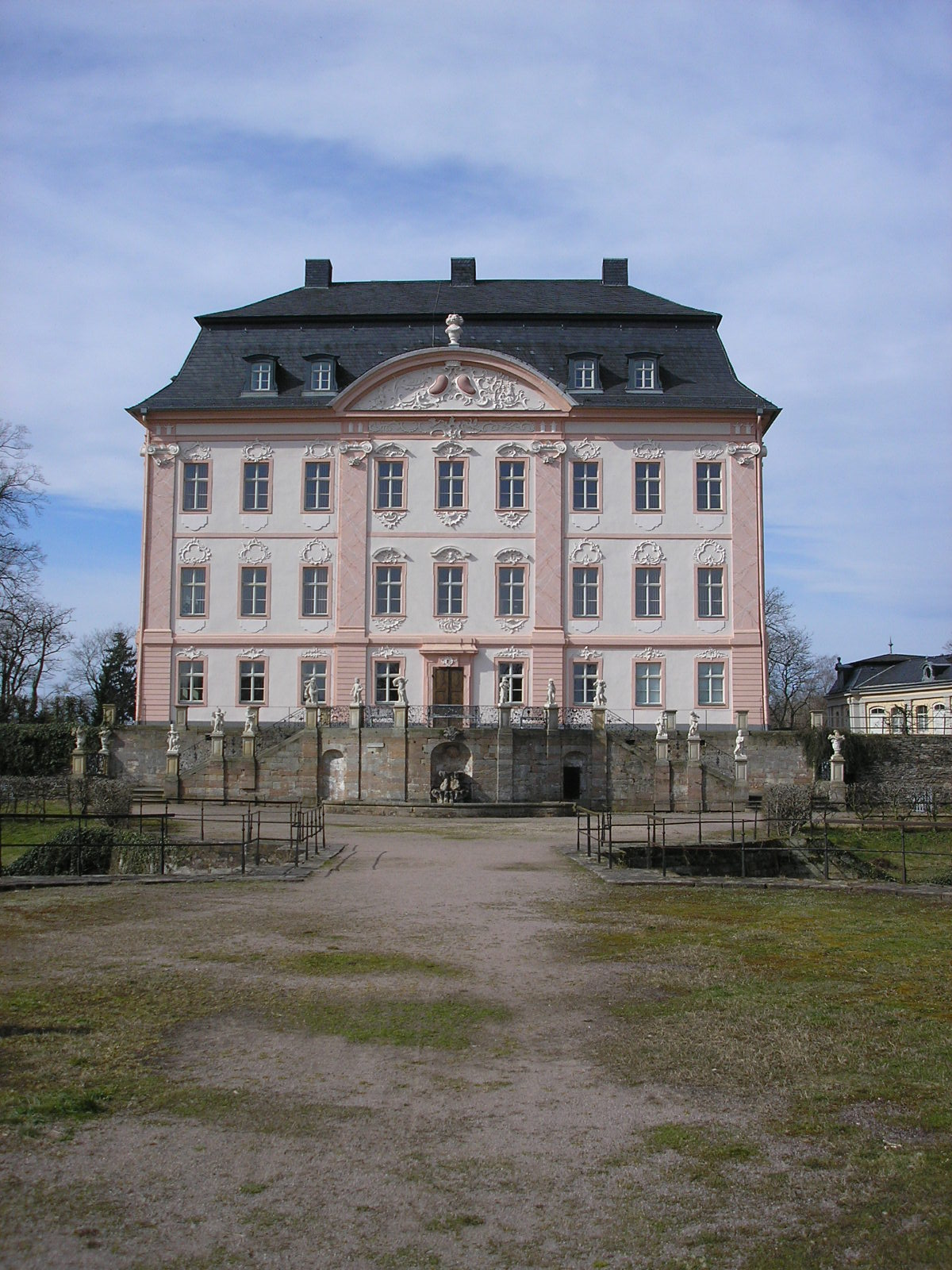
East side

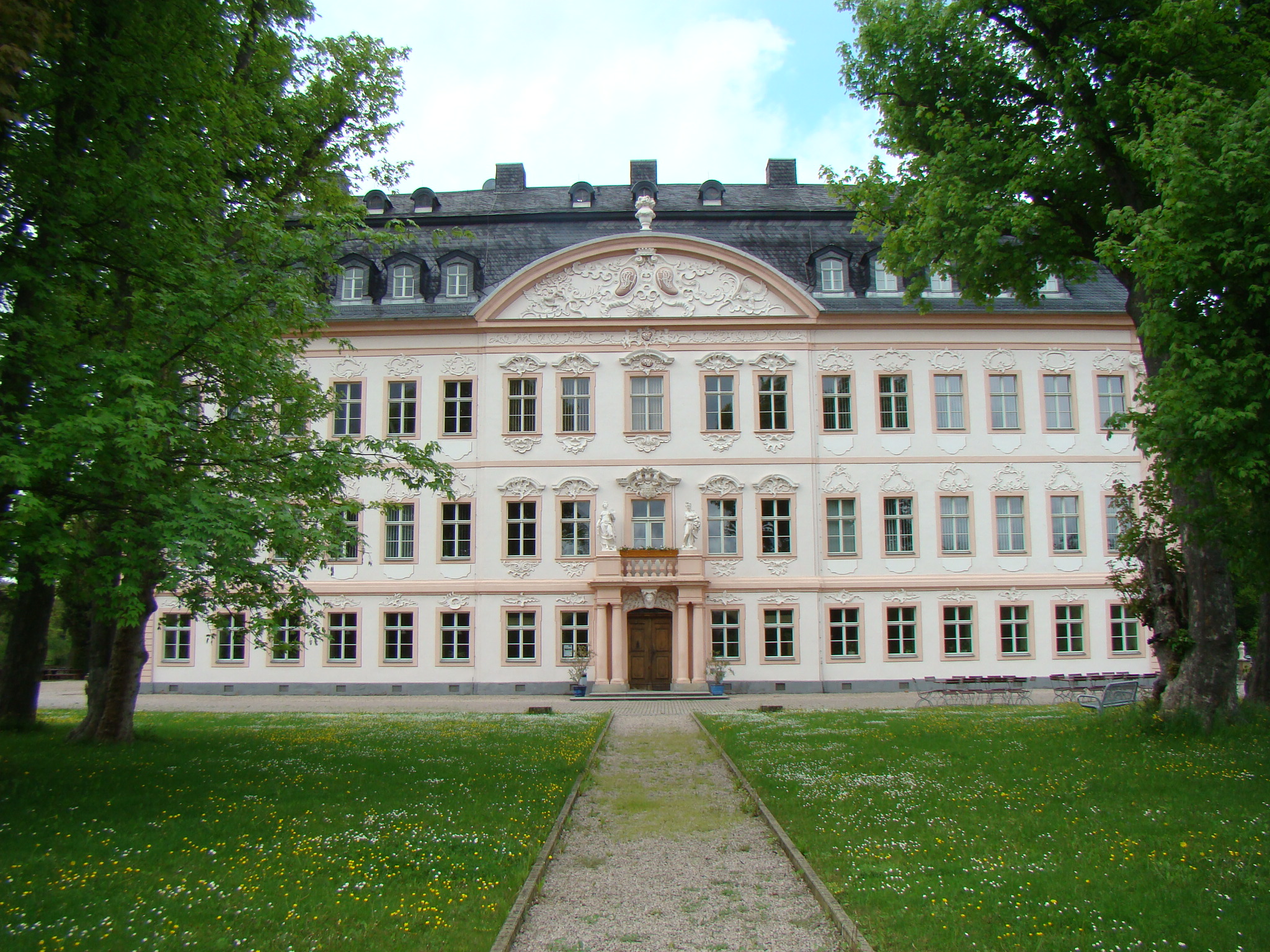
South façade

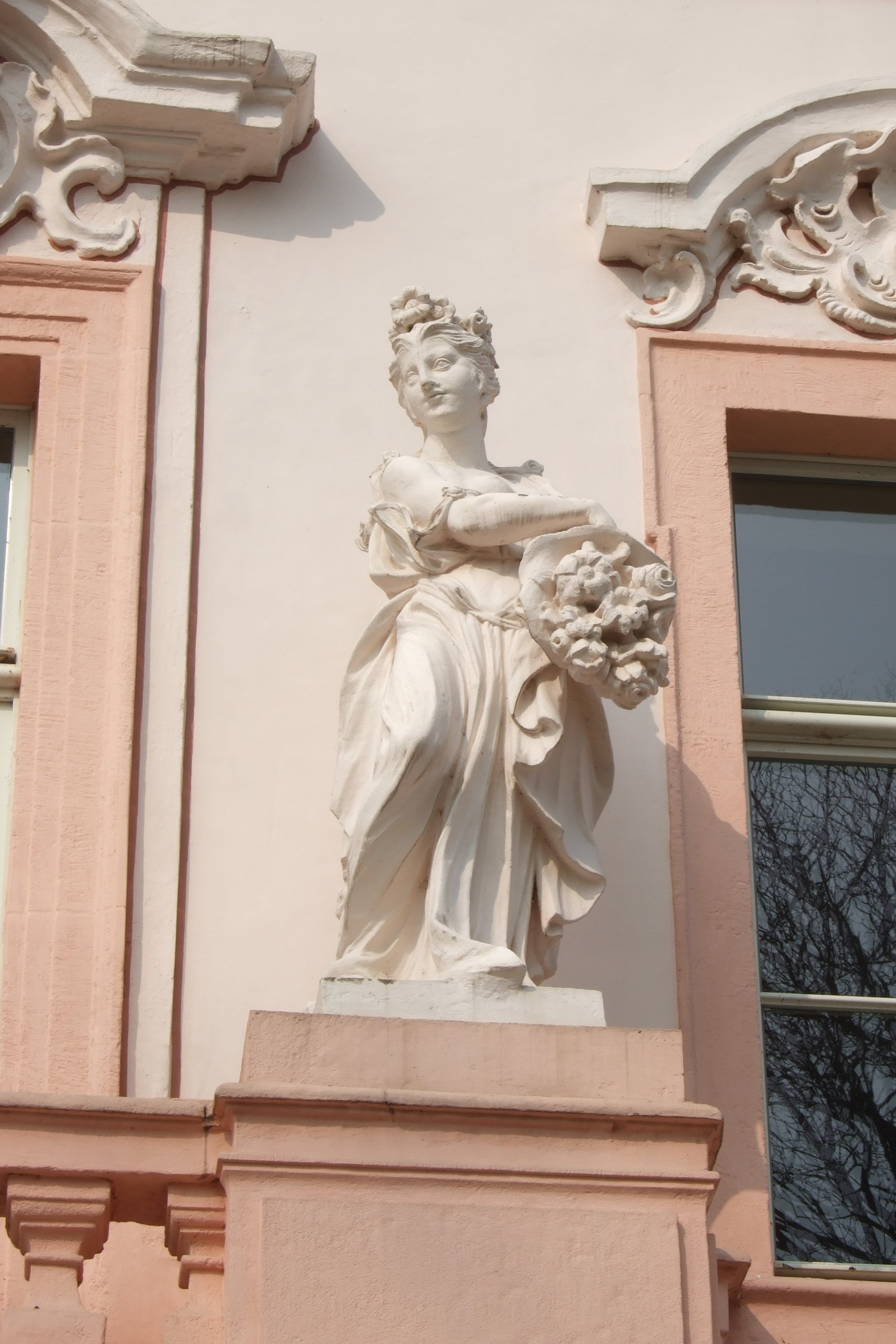
Statuary

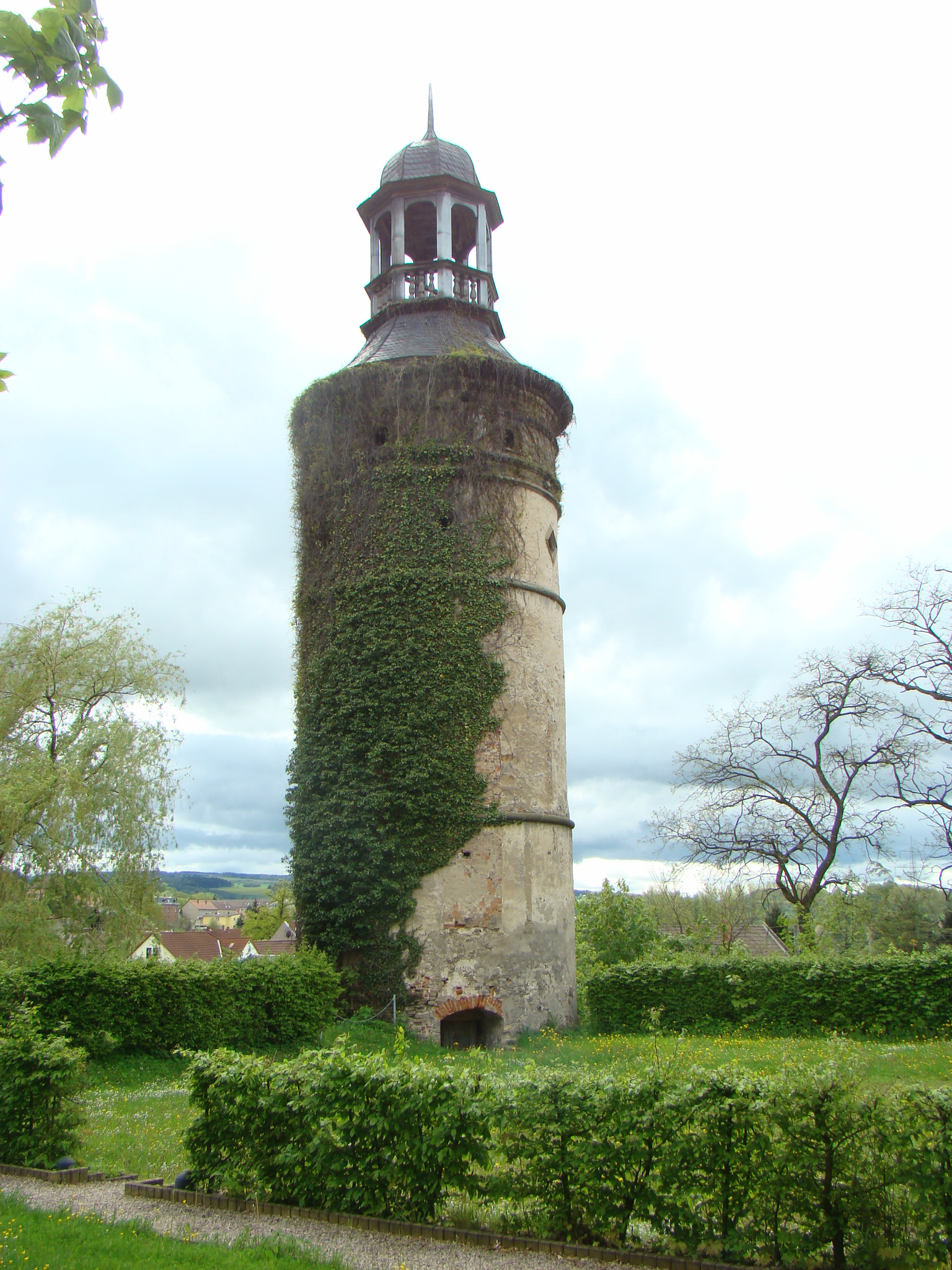
Tower of the former Friedrichstein Castle

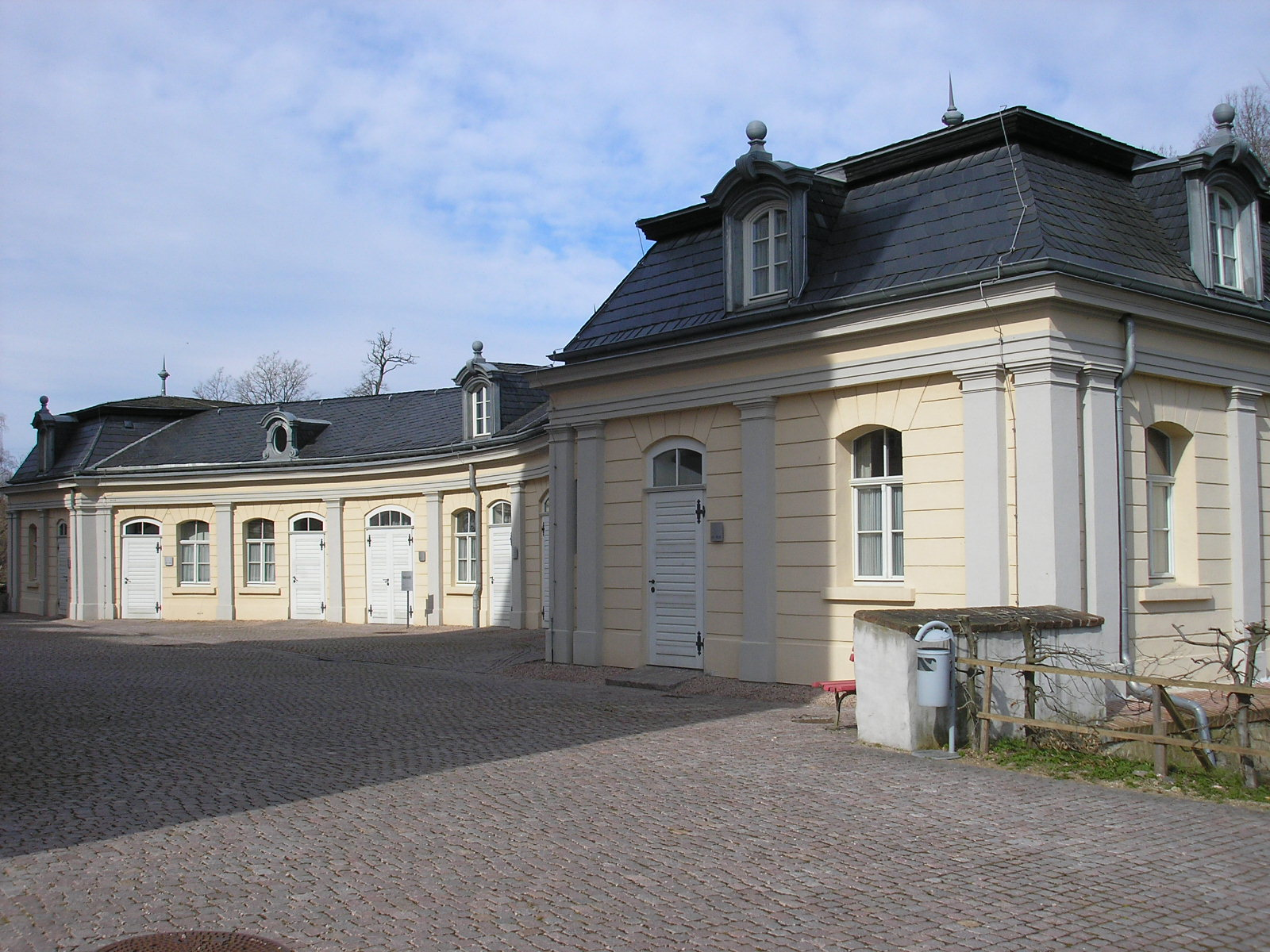
Coach house

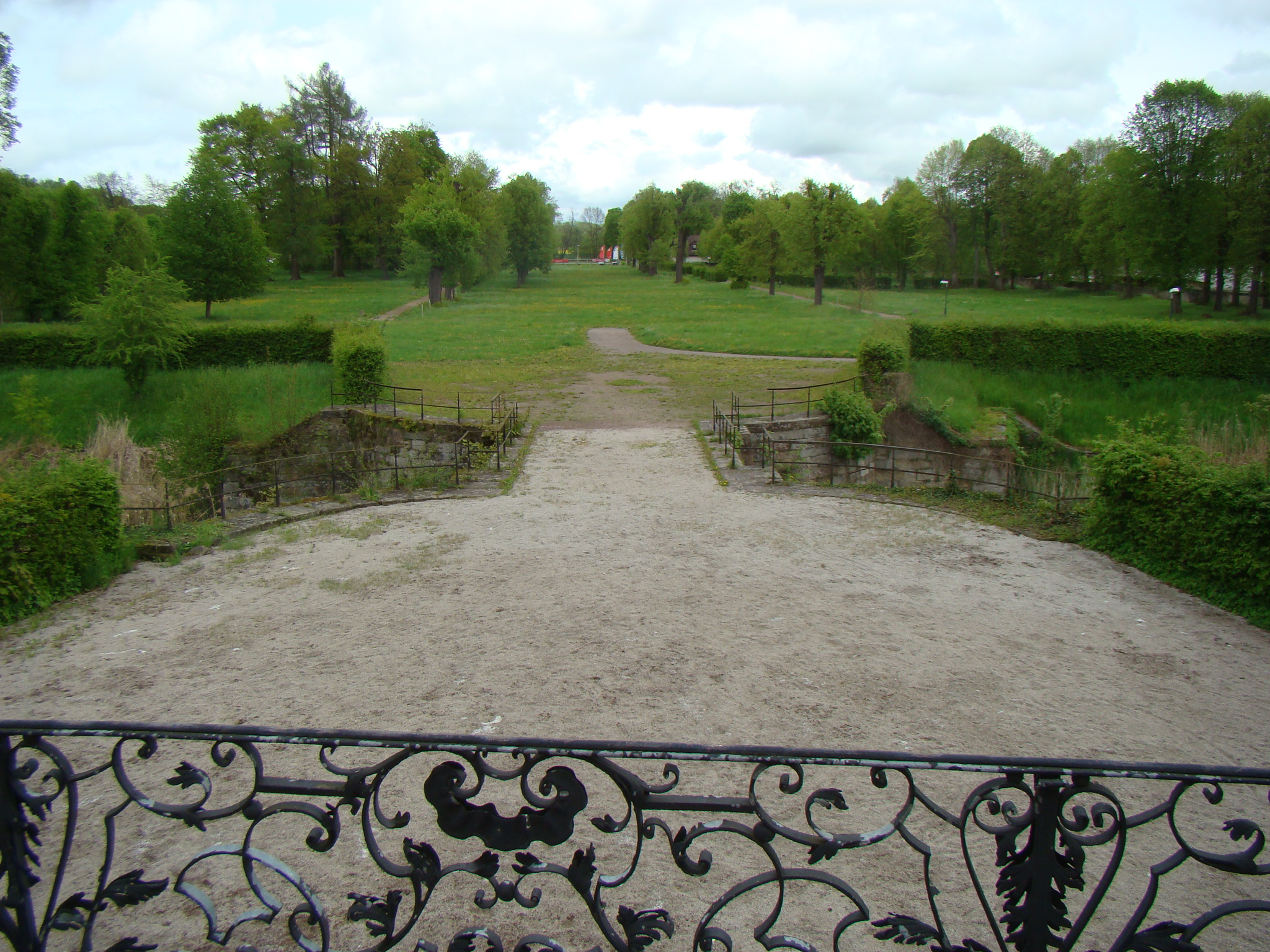
Castle park
