= Minister President of Prussia =

Chief minister of the King in Prussia

Minister-President of Prussia
- Ministerpräsident
- Coat of arms of Prussia

- Flag of the minister president of Prussia (1927–1933)

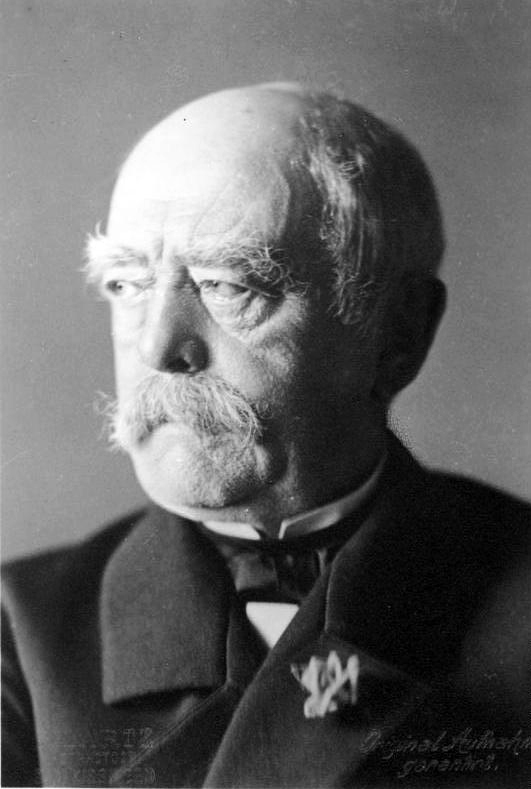
- Longest serving Otto von Bismarck; 23 September 1862–1 January 1873; 9 November 1873–20 March 1890
- Seat: Wilhelmstrasse, Berlin
- Appointer: King of Prussia (1848–1918) Landtag of Prussia (1918–1933) Reichsstatthalter (1933–1945)
- Precursor: Chief minister of Prussia
- Formation: 19 March 1848
- First holder: Adolf Heinrich von Arnim-Boitzenburg
- Final holder: Hermann Göring
- Abolished: 23 April 1945

The minister-president (German: Ministerpräsident), or prime minister, of Prussia was the head of government of the Prussian state. The office existed from 1848, when it was formed by King Frederick William IV during the 1848–49 Revolution, until the abolition of Prussia in 1947 by the Allied Control Council.

== History of the office ==
Under the Kingdom of Prussia, the minister-president functioned as the chief minister of the king, and presided over the Landtag, the Prussian legislature established in 1848. After the unification of Germany in 1871 and until the 1918–1919 revolution, the office of the Prussian minister-president was usually held by the chancellor of the German Empire, beginning with the tenure of Otto von Bismarck.

Under the Free State of Prussia the minister-president was the head of the state government in a more traditional parliamentary role during the Weimar Republic. The office ceased to have any real meaning except as a kind of political patronage title after the takeover by the national government in 1932 (Preußenschlag), and after Nazi Germany dismantled Prussia as a state in 1935 (Reichsstatthaltergesetz). Eventually, the office was abolished along with Prussia itself by the Allies in the aftermath of World War II.

== Chief ministers of the Kingdom of Prussia (1702–1848) ==
- 1702–1711: Johann Kasimir Kolbe von Wartenberg
- 1711–1728: Heinrich Rüdiger von Ilgen
- 1728–1739: Friedrich Wilhelm von Grumbkow
- 1739–1749: Heinrich von Podewils
- 1749–1753: Georg Dietloff von Arnim-Boitzenburg
- 1749–1777: Count Karl-Wilhelm Finck von Finckenstein
- 1777–1802: Friedrich Anton von Heynitz
- 1786–1798: Friedrich Wilhelm von Arnim-Boitzenburg
- 1802–1804: Count Christian Heinrich Kurt von Haugwitz (1st term)
- 1804–1806: Count Karl August von Hardenberg (1st term)
- 1806: Count Christian Heinrich Kurt von Haugwitz (2nd term)
- 1806–1807: Carl Friedrich von Beyme
- 1807: Count Karl August von Hardenberg (2nd term)
- 1807–1808: Baron Heinrich Friedrich Karl vom und zum Stein
- 1808–1810: Count Karl Friedrich Ferdinand Alexander zu Dohna-Schlobitten
- 1810–1822: Prince Karl August von Hardenberg (3rd term)
- 1822–1823: Otto von Voß
- 1823–1841: Count Carl Friedrich Heinrich, Graf von Wylich und Lottum
- 1841–1848: Ludwig Gustav von Thile

== List of minister-presidents of Prussia (1848–1945) ==
=== Minister-presidents of the Kingdom of Prussia (1848–1918) ===
Political party: Zentrum None

Portrait	Name (Birth–Death)	Term of office			Political party
Portrait	Name (Birth–Death)	Took office	Left office	Days	Political party
	Count Adolf Heinrich von Arnim-Boitzenburg (1803–1868)	19 March 1848	29 March 1848	10	Non-partisan
	Gottfried Ludolf Camphausen (1803–1890)	29 March 1848	20 June 1848	83	Non-partisan
	Rudolf von Auerswald (1795–1866)	25 June 1848	8 September 1848	75	Non-partisan
	Ernst von Pfuel (1779–1866)	21 September 1848	1 November 1848	41	Non-partisan
	Count Friedrich Wilhelm von Brandenburg (1792–1850)	2 November 1848	6 November 1850	734	Non-partisan
	Baron Otto Theodor von Manteuffel (1805–1882)	9 December 1850	6 November 1858	2889	Non-partisan
	Prince Karl Anton von Hohenzollern (1811–1885)	6 November 1858	12 March 1862	1222	Non-partisan
	Prince Adolf zu Hohenlohe-Ingelfingen (1797–1873)	17 March 1862	23 September 1862	190	Non-partisan
	Prince Otto von Bismarck (1815–1898); First term	23 September 1862	1 January 1873	3753	Non-partisan
	Count Albrecht von Roon (1803–1879)	1 January 1873	9 November 1873	312	Non-partisan
	Prince Otto von Bismarck (1815–1898); Second term	9 November 1873	20 March 1890	5975	Non-partisan
	Count Leo von Caprivi (1831–1899)	20 March 1890	22 March 1892	733	Non-partisan
	Count Botho zu Eulenburg (1831–1912)	22 March 1892	26 October 1894	948	Non-partisan
	Prince Chlodwig zu Hohenlohe-Schillingsfürst (1819–1901)	29 October 1894	17 October 1900	2179	Non-partisan
	Prince Bernhard von Bülow (1849–1929)	17 October 1900	14 July 1909	3192	Non-partisan
	Theobald von Bethmann Hollweg (1856–1921)	14 July 1909	13 July 1917	2921	Non-partisan
	Georg Michaelis (1857–1936)	14 July 1917	1 November 1917	110	Non-partisan
	Count Georg von Hertling (1843–1919)	1 November 1917	30 September 1918	333	Centre
	Prince Maximilian von Baden (1867–1929)	3 October 1918	9 November 1918	37	Non-partisan

=== Minister-presidents of the Free State of Prussia (1918–1945) ===
Political party: SPD USPD Zentrum NSDAP None

Portrait	Name (Birth–Death)	Term of office			Political party
Portrait	Name (Birth–Death)	Took office	Left office	Days	Political party
Minister-presidents of the Free State of Prussia in the Weimar Republic
	Paul Hirsch (1868–1940)	12 November 1918	27 March 1920	501	Social Democratic Party of Germany
	Heinrich Ströbel (1869–1944); Co-prime minister	12 November 1918	9 January 1919	29	Independent Social Democratic Party of Germany
	Otto Braun (1872–1955); First term	27 March 1920	21 April 1921	390	Social Democratic Party of Germany
	Adam Stegerwald (1874–1945)	21 April 1921	5 November 1921	198	Centre Party
	Otto Braun (1872–1955); Second term	5 November 1921	18 February 1925	1201	Social Democratic Party of Germany
	Wilhelm Marx (1863–1946)	18 February 1925	6 April 1925	47	Centre Party
	Otto Braun (1872–1955); Third term	6 April 1925	20 July 1932	2662	Social Democratic Party of Germany
	Franz von Papen (1879–1969)	Reichskommissar		136	Non-partisan
	Franz von Papen (1879–1969)	20 July 1932	3 December 1932	136	Non-partisan
	Kurt von Schleicher (1882–1934)	Reichskommissar		56	Non-partisan
	Kurt von Schleicher (1882–1934)	3 December 1932	28 January 1933	56	Non-partisan
	Franz von Papen (1879–1969)	Reichskommissar		70	Non-partisan
	Franz von Papen (1879–1969)	30 January 1933	10 April 1933	70	Non-partisan
	Adolf Hitler (1889–1945)	Reichsstatthalter		730	Nazi Party
	Adolf Hitler (1889–1945)	30 January 1933	30 January 1935	730	Nazi Party
Minister-president of the Free State of Prussia in Nazi Germany
	Hermann Göring (1893–1946)	Ministerpräsident		4396	Nazi Party
	Hermann Göring (1893–1946)	10 April 1933	23 April 1945	4396	Nazi Party
	Hermann Göring (1893–1946)	Reichsstatthalter		3736	Nazi Party
	Hermann Göring (1893–1946)	30 January 1935	23 April 1945	3736	Nazi Party

== See also ==
- Deputy Prime Minister of Prussia
- Ministry of the Royal Family (Prussia)
- List of Prussian monarchs
- Constitution of Prussia (1848)
- List of chancellors of Germany
- Minister president (Germany)
