= Arnim family =

German noble family from Brandenburg

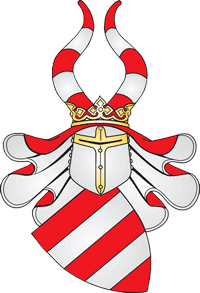
Arnim Coat of arms

The House of Arnim is an ancient (uradel) German noble family, originally from Altmark, part of the mediaeval March of Brandenburg. Members of the family occupied many important positions within Holy Roman Empire, Saxony, Prussia, German Empire and the German Reich.

== History ==
They are one of the oldest extant Prussian noble families, being first attested to in 1204. On 2 October 1786, one branch of the family was raised to the title of Count in Prussia by King Frederick William II, while a second branch was raised to the same title in 1870 by King William I of Prussia. The Count von Arnim-Boitzenburg was one of the hereditary members of the Prussian House of Lords from 1852-1918, when it was dissolved. Numerous branches of the family still exist today. Perhaps the most famous member of the family was the novelist, Countess Elizabeth von Arnim-Schlagenthin.

== Properties ==
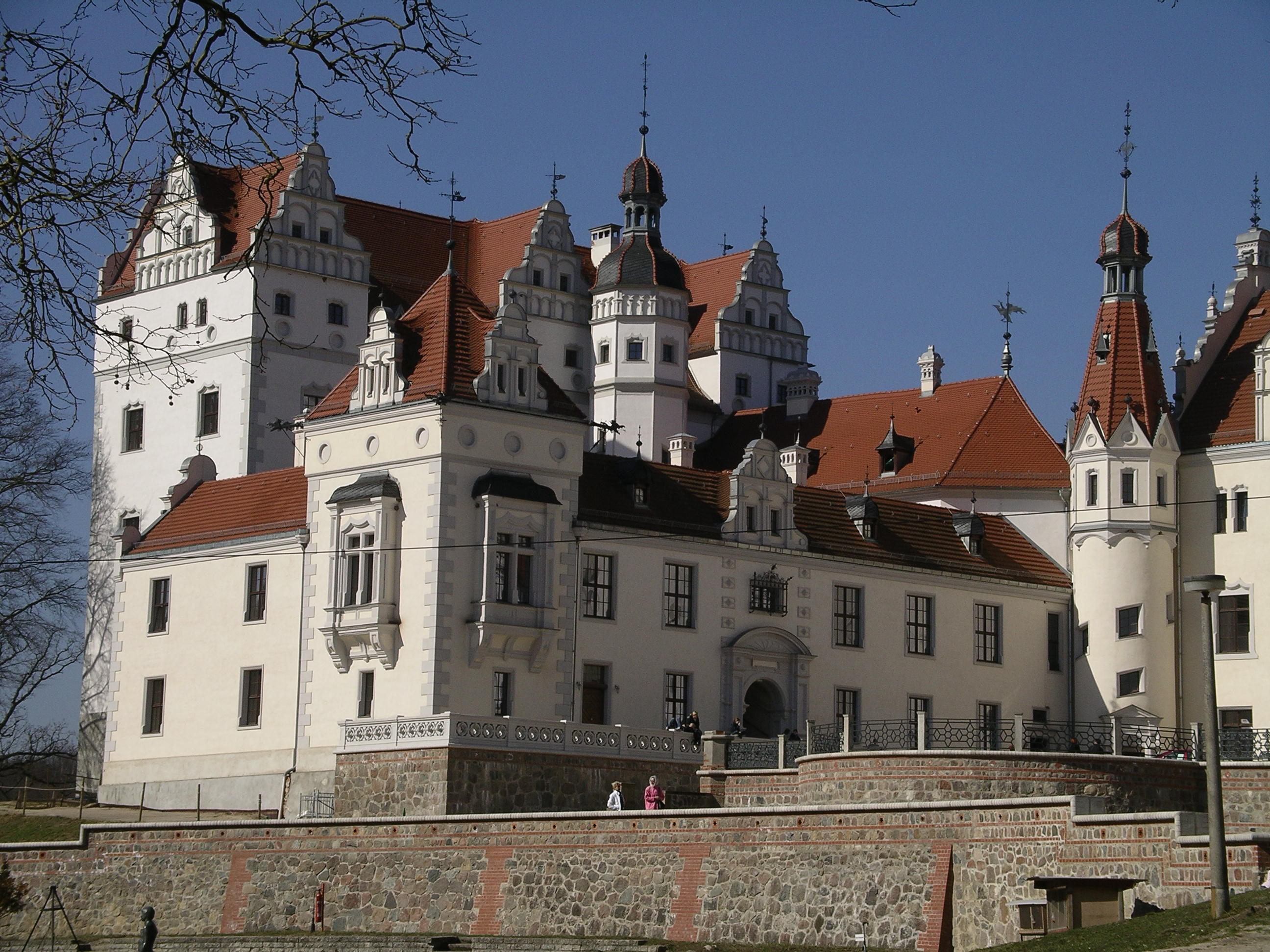
Castle Boitzenburg

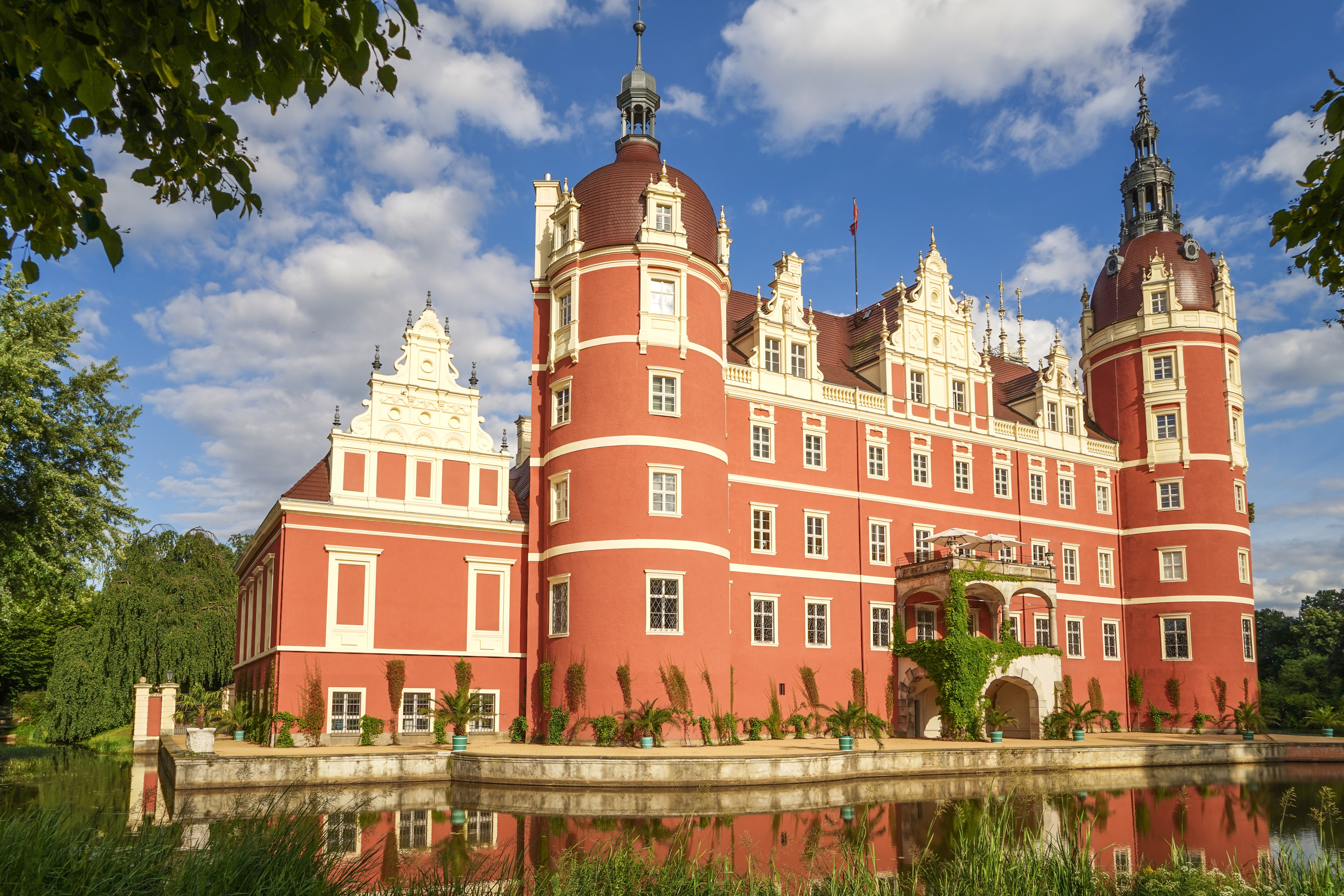
Castle Muskau

== Notable members ==
- Hans Georg von Arnim-Boitzenburg (1583–1641), German field marshal, diplomat, and politician
- Georg Dietloff von Arnim-Boitzenburg (1679–1753), Prussian statesman
- Ludwig Achim von Arnim (1781–1831), German poet and novelist
- Bettina von Arnim (1785–1859), German writer and novelist
- Heinrich Friedrich von Arnim-Heinrichsdorff-Werbelow (1791-1859) a Prussian statesman
- Adolf Heinrich von Arnim-Boitzenburg (1803–1868), German statesman
- Ferdinand von Arnim (1814–1866), German architect and watercolour-painter
- Gisela von Arnim (1827–1889), German writer
- Bernd von Arnim (died 1917), German naval officer
- Friedrich Sixt von Armin (1851–1936), German World War I general
- Hans-Heinrich Sixt von Armin (1890–1952), German World War II general
- Hans-Jürgen von Arnim (1889–1962), German World War II general
- Iris von Arnim (born 1945), German fashion designer
- Arnulf von Arnim (born 1947), German classical pianist and teacher
