= Friedrich Anton von Heynitz =

German economist and politician (1725–1802)

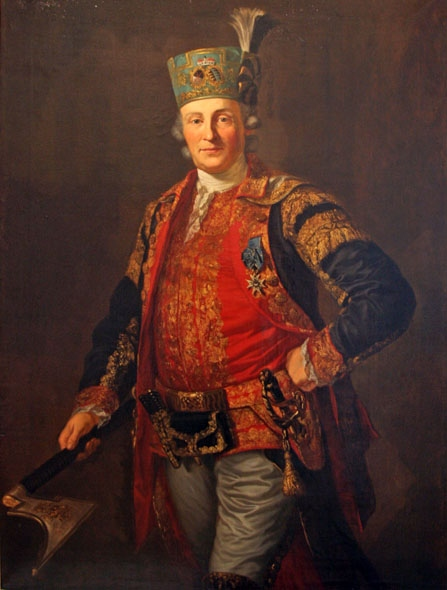
Portrait in the Dresden gallery by Anton Graff, 1772

Friedrich Anton von Heynitz (14 May 1725 – 15 May 1802) was an aristocrat and cameralist in Saxony who founded the oldest mining school in the world, the Bergakademie Freiberg. He studied mining and was involved in reforming the mining and metallurgy industry in Prussia. His economic principles were of a moderate mercantilism, anti-monopolistic, and supported an enlightened absolutism.

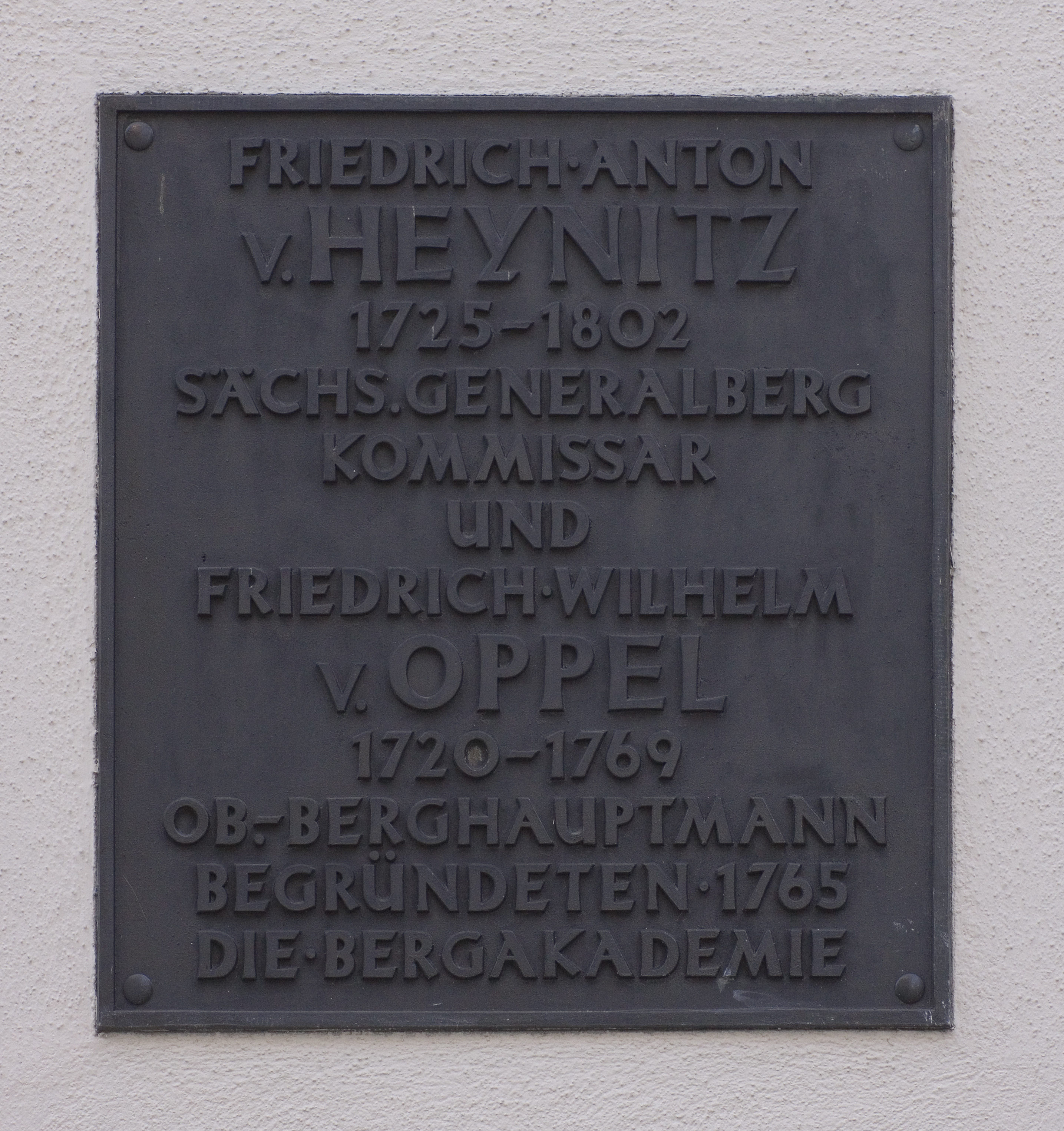
Plaque at Freiberg

Heynitz was born in Dröschkau, near Torgau, where his father Georg Ernst (1692–1751) was a privy councillor and a member of the royal counsel. His mother Sophie Dorothea came from the influential von Hardenberg family. He was educated at the royal school in Pforta after which he studied natural sciences at Dresden followed by studies in mining and metallurgy at Kösen (1742) and Freiberg (1744–45). In 1746 he was appointed inspector in the mining council at Blankenburg and he travelled through Sweden, Hungary and Styria to study mining there. In 1762 he became a chief inspector of the mines (Vizeberghauptmann) with the Lower Harz region under his jurisdiction. In 1764 he became General Mining Commissioner for Saxony and was involved in major reforms including a proposal for the establishment of the Bergakademie Freiberg along with the Commissioner for Freiberg, Friedrich Wilhelm von Oppel, in 1765. The proposal was accepted by Prince Xaver but the growth was affected by the Seven Years' War. He resigned his position in 1774 after differences of opinion over the establishment of Saxon salt works. He then began studies in economics and languages at his estate and travelled through France and England.

In 1777 he was offered a position by Frederick II of Prussia and became a Chief of mining, overseeing mines in Silesia, Westphalia and Saxony. He worked on reforms in taxation, changes in management, improvements to transport infrastructure and other commercial aspects. He helped grow both state-owned and private industry. He reintroduced mining in Tarnowitz and established the first coke blast furnace in Gliwice in 1796. The Berlin Bergakademie was started in 1770 along the lines of the one at Freiberg and he helped reorganize it. He also helped found the Bauakademie in Berlin in 1798. Heynitz also enlisted Alexander von Humboldt in implementing his reform program in Prussia's Franconian provinces.

Heynitz served under three kings and was awarded the Order of the Black Eagle in 1791.
