= Bülow cabinet (Prussia) =

- Cabinet of the Kingdom of Prussia
- 1900–1909
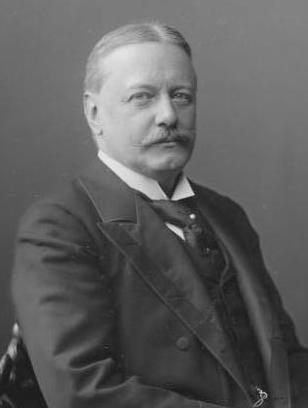
- Minister President Bülow
- Date formed: October 17, 1900
- Date dissolved: July 14, 1909 (8 years, 8 months, 3 weeks and 6 days)

People and organisations
- King: William II
- Minister President: Bernhard von Bülow
- Deputy Prime Minister: Johannes von Miquel; Arthur von Posadowsky-Wehner; Theobald von Bethmann Hollweg

History
- Predecessor: Hohenlohe-Schillingsfürst cabinet
- Successor: Bethmann Hollweg cabinet

The Bülow cabinet formed the Prussian State Ministry appointed by King William II from October 17, 1900, to July 14, 1909.

== Cabinet members ==
Portfolio	Minister	Took office	Left office	Party
Minister President	Bernhard von Bülow	October 17, 1900	July 14, 1909	N/A
Deputy Prime Minister	Johannes von Miquel	October 17, 1900	May 5, 1901	NLP
Deputy Prime Minister	Arthur von Posadowsky-Wehner	May 5, 1901	June 24, 1907	DRP
Deputy Prime Minister	Theobald von Bethmann Hollweg	June 16, 1907	July 14, 1909	N/A
Minister of Foreign Affairs	Bernhard von Bülow	October 17, 1900	July 14, 1909	N/A
Minister of Finance	Johannes von Miquel	October 17, 1900	May 5, 1901	NLP
Minister of Finance	Georg von Rheinbaben	May 5, 1901	July 14, 1909	N/A
Minister of Spiritual, Educational and Medical Affairs	Conrad von Studt	October 17, 1900	June 24, 1907	N/A
Minister of Spiritual, Educational and Medical Affairs	Ludwig Holle	June 24, 1907	July 14, 1909	N/A
Minister of Justice	Karl von Schönstedt	October 17, 1900	November 20, 1905	N/A
Minister of Justice	Max von Beseler	November 20, 1905	July 14, 1909	N/A
Minister of Trade and Commerce	Ludwig Brefeld	October 17, 1900	May 5, 1901	N/A
Minister of Trade and Commerce	Theodor von Möller	May 5, 1901	October 18, 1905	NLP
Minister of Trade and Commerce	Clemens Delbrück	October 18, 1905	July 14, 1909	N/A
Minister of Public Works	Karl von Thielen	October 17, 1900	June 23, 1902	N/A
Minister of Public Works	Hermann von Budde	June 23, 1902	April 28, 1906	N/A
Minister of Public Works	Paul von Breitenbach	May 11, 1906	July 14, 1909	N/A
Minister of Interior Affairs	Georg von Rheinbaben	October 17, 1900	May 5, 1901	N/A
Minister of Interior Affairs	Hans von Hammerstein-Loxten	May 5, 1901	March 20, 1905	N/A
Minister of Interior Affairs	Theobald von Bethmann Hollweg	March 21, 1905	June 24, 1907	N/A
Minister of Interior Affairs	Friedrich von Moltke	June 24, 1907	July 14, 1909	N/A
Minister of War	Heinrich von Goßler	October 17, 1900	August 14, 1903	N/A
Minister of War	Karl von Einem	August 14, 1903	July 14, 1909	N/A
Minister of Agriculture, Domains and Forestry	Ernst von Hammerstein-Loxten	October 17, 1900	May 5, 1901	N/A
Minister of Agriculture, Domains and Forestry	Victor von Podbielski	May 5, 1901	November 11, 1906	DKP
Minister of Agriculture, Domains and Forestry	Theobald von Bethmann Hollweg	November 12, 1906	November 21, 1906	N/A
Minister of Agriculture, Domains and Forestry	Bernd von Arnim	November 21, 1906	July 14, 1909	N/A

== See also ==
- Prussian State Ministry
