= Caprivi cabinet (Prussia) =

Camphausen Cabinet
- Cabinet of the Kingdom of Prussia
- 1890–1892
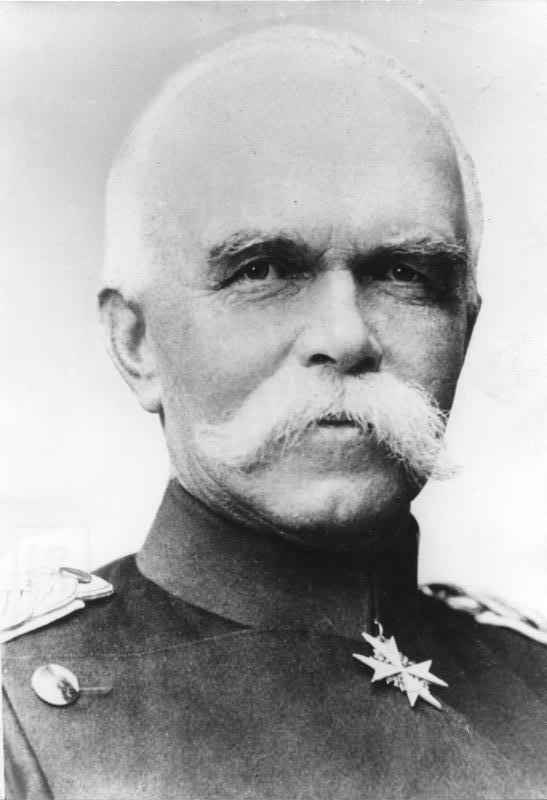
- Minister President Caprivi
- Date formed: March 20, 1890
- Date dissolved: March 23, 1892 (2 years and 3 days)

People and organisations
- King: William II
- Minister President: Leo von Caprivi
- Deputy Prime Minister: Karl von Boetticher

History
- Predecessor: Bismarck-Roon cabinet
- Successor: Eulenburg cabinet

The Caprivi Cabinet formed the Prussian State Ministry appointed by William II, King of Prussia and German Emperor, from March 20, 1890, to March 23, 1892.

== History ==
The inauguration of the new cabinet after Otto von Bismarck's long reign was accompanied by a liberal-conservative domestic policy reorientation, the "New Course", which was intended to integrate the population groups that had been excluded by Bismarck's policies, Catholics and Social Democrats, into the German Empire. Due to the conservatives' opposition to many of the reform plans, they could only be implemented in a limited manner and Leo von Caprivi was replaced as Minister President after just two years by the conservative Botho zu Eulenburg. The leading head of the cabinet was the national liberal Finance Minister Johannes Miquel.

== Cabinet members ==
Portfolio	Minister	Took office	Left office	Party
Minister President	Leo von Caprivi	March 20, 1890	March 23, 1892	
Deputy Prime Minister	Karl Heinrich von Boetticher	March 20, 1890	March 23, 1892	DRP
Minister of Foreign Affairs	Herbert von Bismarck	March 20, 1890	March 26, 1890	
Minister of Foreign Affairs	Leo von Caprivi	March 27, 1890	March 23, 1892	
Minister of Finance	Adolf von Scholz	March 20, 1890	June 23, 1890	DRP
Minister of Finance	Johannes Miquel	June 23, 1890	March 23, 1892	
Minister of Spiritual, Educational and Medical Affairs	Gustav von Goßler	March 20, 1890	March 12, 1891	DKP
Minister of Spiritual, Educational and Medical Affairs	Robert von Zedlitz-Trützschler	March 12, 1891	March 23, 1892	
Minister of Justice	Hermann von Schelling	March 20, 1890	March 23, 1892	
Minister of Trade and Commerce	Hans Hermann von Berlepsch	March 20, 1890	March 23, 1892	
Minister of Public Works	Albert von Maybach	March 20, 1890	June 20, 1891	
Minister of Public Works	Karl Thielen	June 20, 1891	March 23, 1892	
Minister of Interior Affairs	Ernst Ludwig Herrfurth	March 20, 1890	March 23, 1892	
Minister of War	Julius von Verdy du Vernois	March 20, 1890	October 3, 1890	
Minister of War	Hans von Kaltenborn-Stachau	October 3, 1890	March 23, 1892	
Minister of Agriculture, Domains and Forestry	Robert Lucius von Ballhausen	March 20, 1890	November 14, 1891	DRP
Minister of Agriculture, Domains and Forestry	Wilhelm von Heyden-Cadow	November 14, 1891	March 23, 1892	DKP

== See also ==
- Prussian State Ministry
