= Hohenlohe-Schillingsfürst cabinet (Prussia) =

Hohenlohe-Schillingsfürst Cabinet
- Cabinet of the Kingdom of Prussia
- 1894–1900
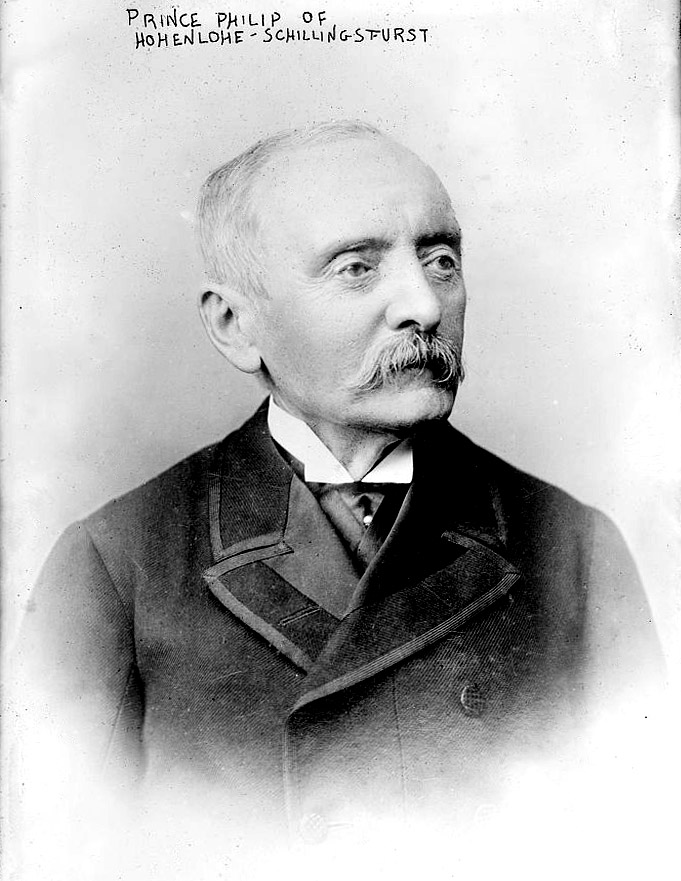
- Minister President Hohenlohe-Schillingsfürst
- Date formed: October 29, 1894
- Date dissolved: October 17, 1900 (5 years, 11 months, 2 weeks and 4 days)

People and organisations
- King: William II
- Minister President: Prince Chlodwig of Hohenlohe-Schillingsfürst
- Deputy Prime Minister: Karl Heinrich von Boetticher; Johannes von Miquel

History
- Predecessor: Eulenburg cabinet
- Successor: Bülow cabinet

The Hohenlohe-Schillingsfürst Cabinet formed the Prussian State Ministry appointed by King William II from October 29, 1894, to October 17, 1900.

== Cabinet members ==
Portfolio	Minister	Took office	Left office	Party
Minister President	Chlodwig zu Hohenlohe-Schillingsfürst	October 29, 1894	October 17, 1900	N/A
Deputy Prime Minister	Karl Heinrich von Boetticher	October 29, 1894	July 1, 1897	DRP
Deputy Prime Minister	Johannes von Miquel	July 1, 1897	October 17, 1900	NLP
Minister of Foreign Affairs	Chlodwig zu Hohenlohe-Schillingsfürst	October 29, 1894	October 17, 1900	N/A
Minister of Finance	Johannes von Miquel	October 29, 1894	October 17, 1900	NLP
Minister of Spiritual, Educational and Medical Affairs	Robert Bosse	October 29, 1894	September 2, 1899	N/A
Minister of Spiritual, Educational and Medical Affairs	Conrad von Studt	September 2, 1899	October 17, 1900	N/A
Minister of Justice	Hermann von Schelling	October 29, 1894	November 13, 1894	N/A
Minister of Justice	Karl Schönstedt	November 13, 1894	October 17, 1900	N/A
Minister of Trade, Commerce and Public Works	Hans Hermann von Berlepsch	October 29, 1894	June 26, 1896	N/A
Minister of Trade, Commerce and Public Works	Ludwig Brefeld	June 26, 1896	October 17, 1900	N/A
Minister of Public Works	Karl Thielen	October 29, 1894	October 17, 1900	N/A
Minister of Interior Affairs	Ernst von Köller	October 29, 1894	December 8, 1895	DKP
Minister of Interior Affairs	Eberhard von der Recke von der Horst	December 8, 1895	September 2, 1899	N/A
Minister of Interior Affairs	Georg von Rheinbaben	September 2, 1899	October 17, 1900	N/A
Minister of War	Walther Bronsart von Schellendorff	October 29, 1894	August 14, 1896	N/A
Minister of War	Heinrich von Goßler	August 14, 1896	October 17, 1900	N/A
Minister of Agriculture, Domains and Forestry	Wilhelm von Heyden-Cadow	October 29, 1894	November 9, 1894	DKP
Minister of Agriculture, Domains and Forestry	Ernst von Hammerstein-Loxten	November 9, 1894	October 17, 1900	N/A

== See also ==
- Prussian State Ministry
