= Eulenburg cabinet =

Camphausen Cabinet
- Cabinet of the Kingdom of Prussia
- 1892–1894
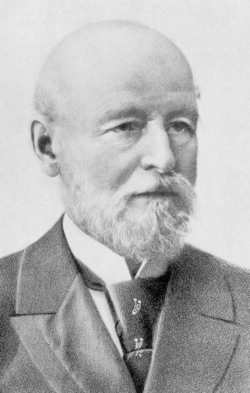
- Minister President Eulenburg
- Date formed: March 23, 1892
- Date dissolved: October 29, 1894 (2 years, 7 months and 6 days)

People and organisations
- King: William II
- Minister President: Botho zu Eulenburg
- Deputy Prime Minister: Karl Heinrich von Boetticher

History
- Predecessor: Caprivi cabinet
- Successor: Hohenlohe-Schillingsfürst cabinet

The Eulenburg Cabinet formed the Prussian State Ministry appointed by King William II from March 23, 1892, to October 29, 1894.

== History ==
Leo von Caprivi was replaced as prime minister by the conservative Botho zu Eulenburg, but remained chancellor and Prussian foreign minister. For the second time, the offices of reich chancellor and Prussian prime minister were separated, with the result that the Reich leadership and the Prussian State Ministry formed two competing and partially blocking centers of power.

== Cabinet members ==
Portfolio	Minister	Took office	Left office	Party
Minister President	Botho zu Eulenburg	March 23, 1892	October 29, 1894	N/A
Deputy Prime Minister	Karl Heinrich von Boetticher	March 23, 1892	October 29, 1894	DRP
Minister of Foreign Affairs	Leo von Caprivi	March 23, 1892	October 29, 1894	N/A
Minister of Finance	Johannes Miquel	March 23, 1892	October 29, 1894	NLP
Minister of Spiritual, Educational and Medical Affairs	Robert Bosse	March 23, 1892	October 29, 1894	N/A
Minister of Justice	Hermann von Schelling	March 23, 1892	October 29, 1894	N/A
Minister of Trade, Commerce and Public Works	Hans Hermann von Berlepsch	March 23, 1892	October 29, 1894	N/A
Minister of Public Works	Karl von Thielen	March 23, 1892	October 29, 1894	N/A
Minister of Interior Affairs	Ernst Ludwig Herrfurth	March 23, 1892	August 9, 1892	N/A
Minister of Interior Affairs	Botho zu Eulenburg	August 9, 1892	October 29, 1894	N/A
Minister of War	Hans von Kaltenborn-Stachau	March 23, 1892	October 17, 1893	N/A
Minister of War	Walther Bronsart von Schellendorff	October 17, 1893	October 29, 1894	N/A
Minister of Agriculture, Domains and Forestry	Wilhelm von Heyden-Cadow	March 23, 1892	October 29, 1894	DKP

== See also ==
- Prussian State Ministry
