= Ernst von Hammerstein-Loxten =

Prussian politician (1827–1914)

Prussian Minister of Agriculture
- In office 1894–1901
- Monarch: Wilhelm II
- Preceded by: Wilhelm von Heyden-Cadow
- Succeeded by: Victor von Podbielski

Personal details
- Born: Ernst Georg von Hammerstein-Loxten; 2 October 1827 Loxten, Kingdom of Hanover
- Died: 5 June 1914 (aged 86) Loxten, Province of Hanover, German Empire
- Spouse: Agnes von Lorch
- Children: 6
- Education: Georg-August University of Göttingen

Ernst Georg, Freiherr von Hammerstein-Loxten (2 October 1827 – 5 June 1914) was a German lawyer and politician in the Kingdom of Hanover. After Hanover's annexation by the Kingdom of Prussia in 1866, he was Prussian Minister of Agriculture from 1894 to 1901.

== Early life ==
Hammerstein was born on 2 October 1827 at Loxten im Artland in the Osnabrück district into the older branch of the Loxten line of the von Hammerstein family. He was a son of Dorothea née von Rössing (1803–1847) and Hermann von Hammerstein-Loxten (1801–1876), of Loxten and Dieck among others, including the Burgmannshof Loxter Hof in Quakenbrück. His brother, Ludwig von Hammerstein-Loxten (1839–1927), became a Prussian Infantry General. He was distantly related to the Prussian Interior Minister Hans von Hammerstein-Loxten.

Hammerstein-Loxten studied law at the Georg-August University of Göttingen and became active in the Bremensia Corps in 1849.

== Career ==
After completing his legal exams in 1862, Hammerstein-Loxten worked for the courts in Bersenbrück and Diepholz before becoming a consultant in the Ministry of the Interior of the Kingdom of Hanover. As a Lord of the manor, he was also a member of the Assembly of the Kingdom of Hanover (German: Ständeversammlung).

=== Province of Hanover ===
Following Hanover's defeat in the Austro-Prussian War, and although King George V released the country's officials from their oath after the annexation of Hanover (when it became the Prussian Province of Hanover), Hammerstein-Loxten found himself in a conflict of loyalties. The fact that he took part in the protests of the nobility meant that he was put under questioning by the Prussian government. Nevertheless, from February to August 1867 he sat in the constituent Reichstag of the North German Confederation, where he was a member of the Federal Constitutional Association (which later became the Centre Party). He did not agree to the constitution of the North German Confederation.

Eventually, Hammerstein-Loxten began to come to terms with the annexation. He was a member of the Provincial Parliament (German: Provinziallandtag) of the province of Hanover and at times chairman of the provincial committee. Hammerstein-Loxten managed his estates full-time. He also participated in agricultural advocacy groups. As an agricultural expert, he was a member of the Prussian State Council and the Economic Council. He was also a member of the Central Moor Commission and chairman of the German Agricultural Council. In 1880, Hammerstein "decried the Poor Law's contribution to 'homelessness" (Heimatlosigkeit), a menace that bore 'great moral dangers' and was inimical to the 'German soul.'".

In 1884, Hammerstein-Loxten became Landrat (district administrator) of the Bersenbrück district and, in 1889, Landesdirektor (provincial director) of the province of Hanover. In 1891, he was involved in Emperor Wilhelm II's attempts at reconciliation with the Guelphs.

=== Minister of Agriculture ===
A proven agricultural expert, Hammerstein replaced DKP-affiliated Wilhelm von Heyden-Cadow on 9 November 1894, as the Prussian Minister of Agriculture in the cabinet of Prime Minister and Imperial Chancellor Prince Chlodwig of Hohenlohe-Schillingsfürst. While in office, he was considered one of the leading protagonists of agrarian protectionism and his term saw the introduction of compulsory meat inspection. He remained in his role when Hohenlohe-Schillingsfürst was replaced as Prime Minister of Prussia by Bernhard von Bülow and his cabinet.

He opposed the Social Democratic Party and supported the construction of the Mittelland Canal. After construction failed in 1901 due to the State Parliament majority, Hammerstein-Loxten resigned on 5 May 1901, and was replaced by the DKP-affiliated Victor von Podbielski. Construction on the canal eventually began in 1906.

== Personal life ==
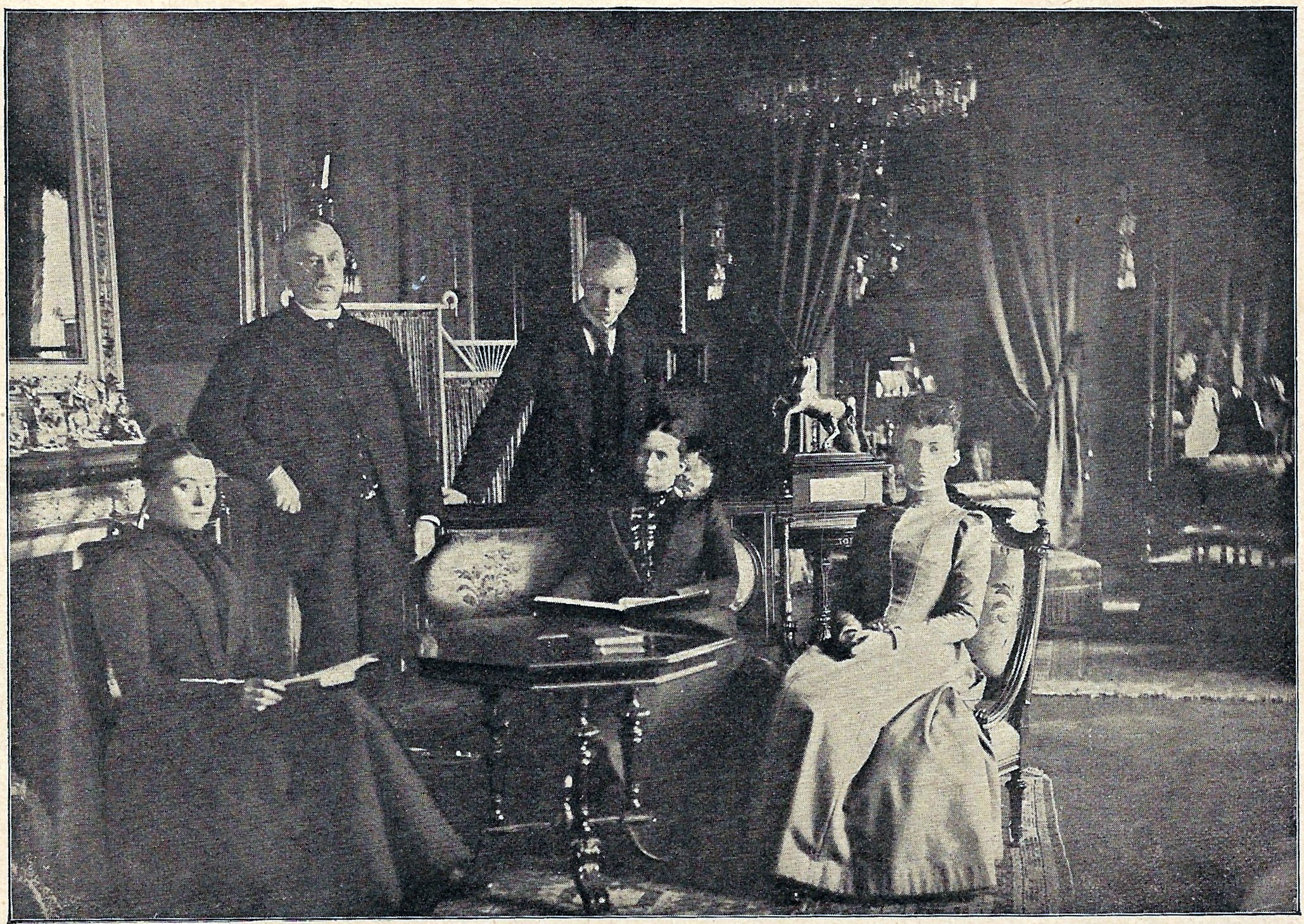
Baron von Hammerstein-Loxten and his children

In 1868, Hammerstein married Agnes von Lorch (1842–1938) in Ariendorf on the Rhine. Together, they were the parents of two sons and four daughters, including:

- Gertrud Agnes Bertha Dorothea Charlotte von Hammerstein-Loxten (b. 1869), who married Baron Friedemann von Münchhausen, district administrator of the Ekhartsberga district, in 1899.
- Dorothea Elise Henriette Bertha Antonie Erna von Hammerstein-Loxten (b. 1871), canoness in Börstel.
- Irmgard Lewine Hedwig Auguste Alma Bertha Anna von Hammerstein-Loxten (b. 1875), who married Friedrich von Bülow, district president in the Bromberg administrative district and son of Albert von Bülow, in 1898.
- Ludwig Paul Ernst Hermann von Hammerstein-Loxten (b. 1880), a Lieutenant.

Hammerstein died on 5 June 1914 at Loxten.

=== Descendants ===
Through his daughter Gertrud, he was a grandfather of Baron Ernst-Friedemann von Münchhausen (1906–2002), who married Marie Luise von Hammerstein (the eldest child of Kurt von Hammerstein-Equord) in c. 1937.

=== Legacy ===
The 1882 Minister von Hammerstein apple variety was named after him.
