= Wichard von Moellendorff =

Wichard von Moellendorff may refer to:

- Wichard Joachim Heinrich von Möllendorf (1724 – 1816), Prussian general
- Wichard von Moellendorff (engineer) (1881 – 1937), German engineer and economist
