= Beer Stein Marker =

Bavarian wool puppets attached to beer tankards

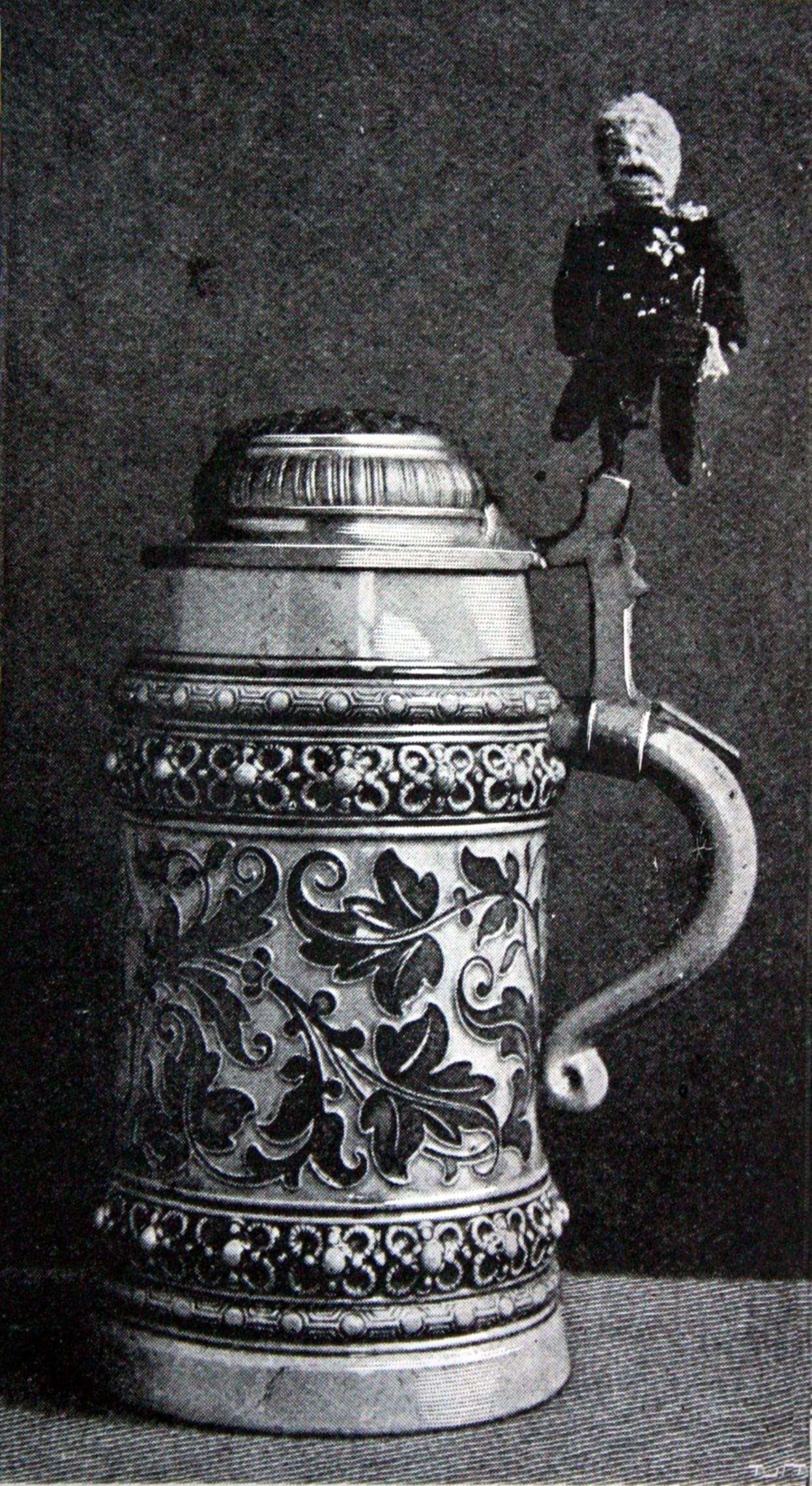
A Fancy Beer-mug with Leo von Caprivi as Beer-marker

Beer Stein Markers were traditionally used by Bavarian beer drinkers as a unique and creative way to identify their beer tankards. These markers, typically about 10cm high, were knitted wool puppets affixed to the thumbpiece on the lid of the tankard. The puppets often took the form of caricatures of contemporary politicians, both popular and unpopular, adding a humorous and satirical element to the practice. This custom was particularly prevalent at the Löwenbräukeller in Munich during the 1890s.

In his 1897 article on beer-markers George Dollar wrote that the "beer-marker" custom has been known to Munich for many years, and that it has been adopted in nearly all of the German cities and towns. In the Löwenbräu Keller the markers are sold for fifty pfennige, or sixpence, each, by an old woman who goes round amongst the beer-drinkers with a basket. She is a well-known character in Munich, and knits the figures herself.

The tradition of using beer markers has been a part of Munich's culture for many years and has been adopted in various other German cities and towns. In the Löwenbräu Keller, these markers were sold by a well-known local woman who knitted the figures herself and sold them for fifty pfennige, or sixpence, each.

In more recent times, the practice has evolved to use brightly coloured plastic tokens affixed to beer bottles at social gatherings to prevent confusion, reflecting the ongoing need for clear identification of individual drinks.
