= Wichard von Moellendorf =

This can refer to:

- Wichard Joachim Heinrich von Möllendorf
- Wichard von Moellendorff (engineer)
