= Poor law (disambiguation) =

Poor law may refer to:

- English Poor Laws (in England and Wales)
- German Poor Laws
- Irish Poor Laws
- Scottish Poor Laws

== See also ==
- Poor relief
