= Arthur von Posadowsky-Wehner =

German conservative statesman (1845–1932)

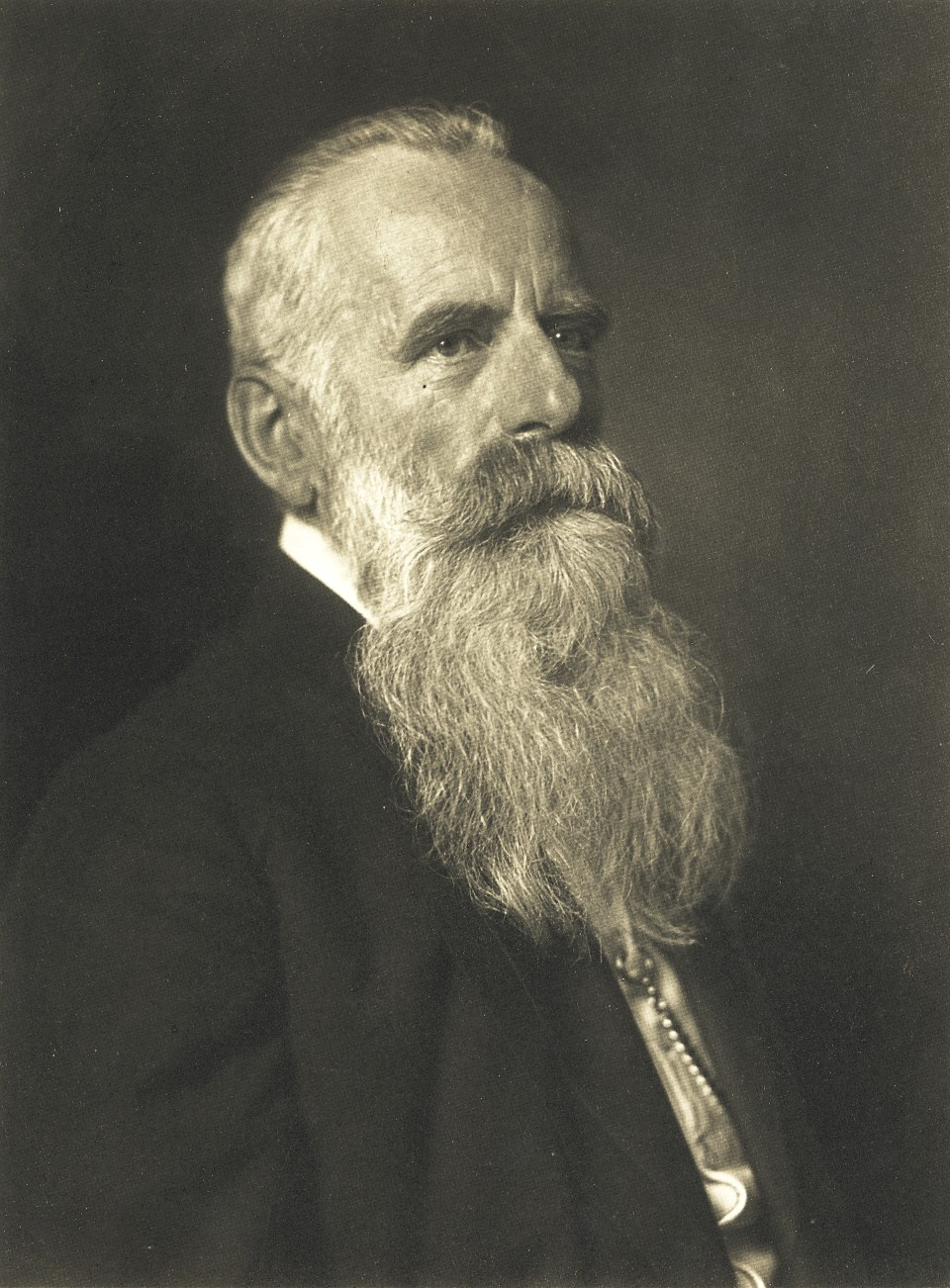
- Posadowsky-Wehner, photographed by Nicola Perscheid before 1930

Vice-Chancellor of the German Empire
- In office 1 July 1897 – 24 June 1907
- Chancellor: Chlodwig, Prince of Hohenlohe-Schillingsfürst; Bernhard von Bülow
- Preceded by: Karl Heinrich von Boetticher
- Succeeded by: Theobald von Bethmann Hollweg

Secretary of State of the Interior
- In office 1 July 1897 – 24 June 1907
- Chancellor: Chlodwig, Prince of Hohenlohe-Schillingsfürst; Bernhard von Bülow
- Preceded by: Karl Heinrich von Boetticher
- Succeeded by: Theobald von Bethmann Hollweg

Secretary of State of the Treasury
- In office 1 September 1893 – 1 July 1897
- Chancellor: Leo von Caprivi; Chlodwig, Prince of Hohenlohe-Schillingsfürst
- Preceded by: Helmuth von Maltzahn
- Succeeded by: Max von Thielmann

Member of the National Assembly
- In office 6 February 1919 – 21 May 1920
- Constituency: Merseburg

Member of the Reichstag
- In office 7 February 1912 – 9 November 1918
- Constituency: Minden 3

Personal details
- Born: 3 June 1845 Gross-Glogau, Province of Silesia, Kingdom of Prussia
- Died: 23 October 1932 (aged 87) Naumburg, Province of Saxony, Prussia, Germany
- Party: Free Conservative Party (1882–1918); German National People's Party (1918–1920); People's Justice Party (1928–1932)
- Spouse: Elise Moeller
- Children: 4
- Education: University of Berlin; University of Heidelberg; University of Breslau
- Occupation: Lawyer

Arthur Adolf, Count of Posadowsky-Wehner, Baron of Postelwitz (German: Arthur Graf von Posadowsky-Wehner Freiherr von Postelwitz, 3 June 1845 – 23 October 1932) was a German conservative statesman. He served as the secretary for the Treasury (1893–1897), secretary of the Interior, vice-chancellor of the German Empire and Prussian minister of State (1897–1907).

== Biography ==
Born to Silesian nobility of distant Polish ancestry, the son of a judge, Posadowsky-Wehner studied law in Berlin, Heidelberg and Breslau and earned a doctorate in law in 1867. He subsequently acquired an agricultural property, and entered politics in 1871, when he became a member of the province government in Posen. In 1882 he became a member of the Parliament of Prussia, and was appointed Landeshauptmann of Posen in 1885.

Posadowsky was a crucial figure for the election reform in 1903. He took care of a new voting technique to protect the secrecy of the ballot for the German parliament.

Posadowsky-Wehner was the candidate of the German National People's Party for the Presidency of Germany in 1919, but he lost to Friedrich Ebert. Posadowsky-Wehner would begin to distance himself from the DNVP in the aftermath of the Kapp Putsch, eventually leaving the party at the end of 1920.

== Honours ==
He received the following orders and decorations:

- Kingdom of Prussia:
  - Knight of the Black Eagle, with Collar
  - Knight of the Wilhelm-Orden, with Collar, 27 January 1900 – on the occasion of the Emperor's birthday
  - Grand Cross of the Red Eagle, with Oak Leaves, 27 January 1902 – on the occasion of the Emperor´s birthday; with chain December 1902
  - Knight of the Crown Order, 1st Class
  - Knight of Justice of the Johanniter Order
- Duchy of Anhalt: Grand Cross of the Order of Albert the Bear
- (Austrian Empire) (Kingdom of Hungary) Austria-Hungary:
  - Grand Cross of the Imperial Order of Leopold, 1900
  - Grand Cross of the Royal Hungarian Order of St. Stephen, 1906
- Baden: Grand Cross of the Zähringer Lion, 1895
- Kingdom of Bavaria:
  - Knight of St. Hubert, 1906
  - Grand Cross of the Merit Order of St. Michael
- Belgium: Grand Cordon of the Order of Leopold (civil)
- Brunswick: Grand Cross of the Order of Henry the Lion
- (Saxe-Coburg and Gotha) (Duchy of Saxe-Altenburg) (Saxe-Meiningen) Ernestine duchies: Grand Cross of the Saxe-Ernestine House Order
- Grand Duchy of Hesse: Grand Cross of the Merit Order of Philip the Magnanimous, 16 November 1898
- Kingdom of Italy: Grand Cross of Saints Maurice and Lazarus
- Mecklenburg: Grand Cross of the Wendish Crown, with Golden Crown, 27 February 1905
- Oldenburg: Grand Cross of the Order of Duke Peter Friedrich Ludwig, with Golden Crown
- Russian Empire: Knight of St. Alexander Nevsky
- Saxe-Weimar-Eisenach: Grand Cross of the White Falcon
- Kingdom of Saxony: Grand Cross of the Albert Order, with Golden Star, 1894
- Württemberg:
  - Grand Cross of the Friedrich Order, 1895
  - Grand Cross of the Württemberg Crown, 1905

== Publications ==
- Über die Altersversorgung der Arbeiter (1883)
- Geschichte des schlesischen adligen Geschlechtes der Grafen Posadowsky-Wehner, Freiherren von Postelwitz (1891)
- Luxus und Sparsamkeit (1909)
- Die Wohnungsfrage als Kulturproblem (1910)
- Volk und Regierung im neuen Reich (1932)

Political offices
Preceded by Karl Heinrich von Boetticher	Vice Chancellor of Germany; 1897–1907	Succeeded by Theobald von Bethmann Hollweg
