= Helmuth von Maltzahn =

German politician (1840–1923)

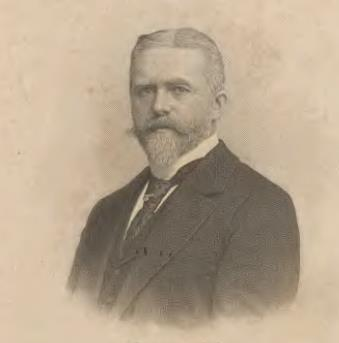
- Helmuth Freiherr von Maltzahn in 1905.

Secretary of State of the Treasury
- In office 14 September 1888 – 12 August 1893
- Chancellor: Otto von Bismarck; Leo von Caprivi
- Preceded by: Karl Rudolf Jacobi
- Succeeded by: Arthur von Posadowsky-Wehner

Oberpräsident of Pomerania
- In office 1900–1911
- Preceded by: Robert von Puttkamer
- Succeeded by: Wilhelm von Waldow

Member of the Reichstag
- In office 1871–1888
- Constituency: Stettin 1

Personal details
- Born: 6 January 1840 Gültz, Province of Pomerania, Prussia
- Died: 11 February 1923 (aged 83) Gültz, Province of Pomerania, Prussia
- Party: Conservatives
- Relations: Günther Freiherr von Maltzahn (grandson)

Helmuth Ludwig Wilhelm Freiherr von Maltzahn (6 January 1840 – 11 February 1923) was a German estate owner, lawyer and cavalry officer who became a member of the nobility, the finance minister of Germany, a deputy in the Reichstag and the Oberpräsident of Pomerania.

== Life ==
Maltzahn was born in Gültz in the Prussian Province of Pomerania. After finishing school, he studied law in Erlangen, Heidelberg, and Berlin. He began his career as an Assessor, but in 1867 he decided to dedicate himself to the administration of his own estate. In the years 1868 to 1872, he built Schloss Gültz, a manor house in the classical style.

Maltzahn participated in the Austro-Prussian War (1866) and the Franco-Prussian War (1870–71) as a cavalry officer. In 1871, he became a member of the Reichstag for the constituency of Anklam-Demmin, and was made chairman of the household committee. In 1875, he received the title Freiherr. From 1888 to 1893, he was finance minister of the German Empire. In 1900, he was appointed to the post of Oberpräsident of Pomerania in Stettin (Szczecin) and held this office until 1911.

== Honours ==
He received the following orders and decorations:

- Iron Cross (1870), 2nd Class (Prussia)
- Knight of the Order of the Red Eagle, 1st Class with Oak Leaves (Prussia)
- Knight of the Order of the Prussian Crown, 1st Class (Prussia)
- Knight's Cross of the Royal House Order of Hohenzollern (Prussia)
- Commander of Justice of the Johanniter Order (Prussia)
- Red Cross Medal, 2nd Class (Prussia)
- Landwehr Service Medal, 2nd Class (Prussia)
- Grand Cross of the Order of Albert the Bear (Anhalt)
- Grand Cross of the Order of the Zähringer Lion, 1892 (Baden)
- Knight of the Merit Order of St. Michael, 1st Class (Bavaria)
- Grand Cross of the Order of Henry the Lion (Brunswick)
- Grand Cross of the Order of the Griffon (Mecklenburg)
- Grand Cross of the Albert Order, with Silver Star (Saxony)
- Grand Cross of the Friedrich Order (Württemberg)

== Literature ==
- Schwabe, Klaus, ed. (1985). Die preußischen Oberpräsidenten 1815–1945. Boppard am Rhein: Boldt. ISBN 3764618574.

Political offices
Preceded by Karl Rudolf Jacobi	Finance Minister of Germany; 1888–1893	Succeeded by Arthur von Posadowsky-Wehner
