= Skórzyn, Lubusz Voivodeship =

Skórzyn
- Village
- Location within Poland
- Coordinates: 52°06′54″N 15°01′16″E
- Country: Poland
- Voivodeship: Lubusz
- County: Krosno
- Gmina: Maszewo
- Elevation: 60 m (200 ft)
- Population: 260

Skórzyn ([ˈskuʐɨn]; German: Skyren, 1937–45 Teichwalde) is a village in the administrative district of Gmina Maszewo, within Krosno County, Lubusz Voivodeship, in western Poland.

The former German chancellor Leo von Caprivi died here on 6 February 1899.
