= Nortrup =

- Municipality
- Coat of arms

- Location of Nortrup within Osnabrück district
- Interactive map of Nortrup
- Location within Germany Location within Lower Saxony
- Coordinates: 52°36′N 07°53′E
- Country: Germany
- State: Lower Saxony
- District: Osnabrück
- Municipal assoc.: Artland

Government
  - Mayor: Leonhard Renze (CDU)

Area
  - Total: 27.08 km^{2} (10.46 sq mi)
- Elevation: 31 m (102 ft)

Population (2025-12-31)
  - Total: 2,925
  - Density: 108.0/km^{2} (279.8/sq mi)
- Time zone: UTC+01:00 (CET)
  - Summer (DST): UTC+02:00 (CEST)
- Postal codes: 49638
- Dialling codes: 05436
- Vehicle registration: OS, BSB, MEL, WTL
- Website: www.nortrup.de

Nortrup is a municipality in the district of Osnabrück, in Lower Saxony, Germany.

== Mayor ==
Leonhard Renze was elected in April 1993. He was the successor of Reinhold Gieseke. Renze was in office till 2016. Since 2016 Karl-Heinz Budke is the new mayor.

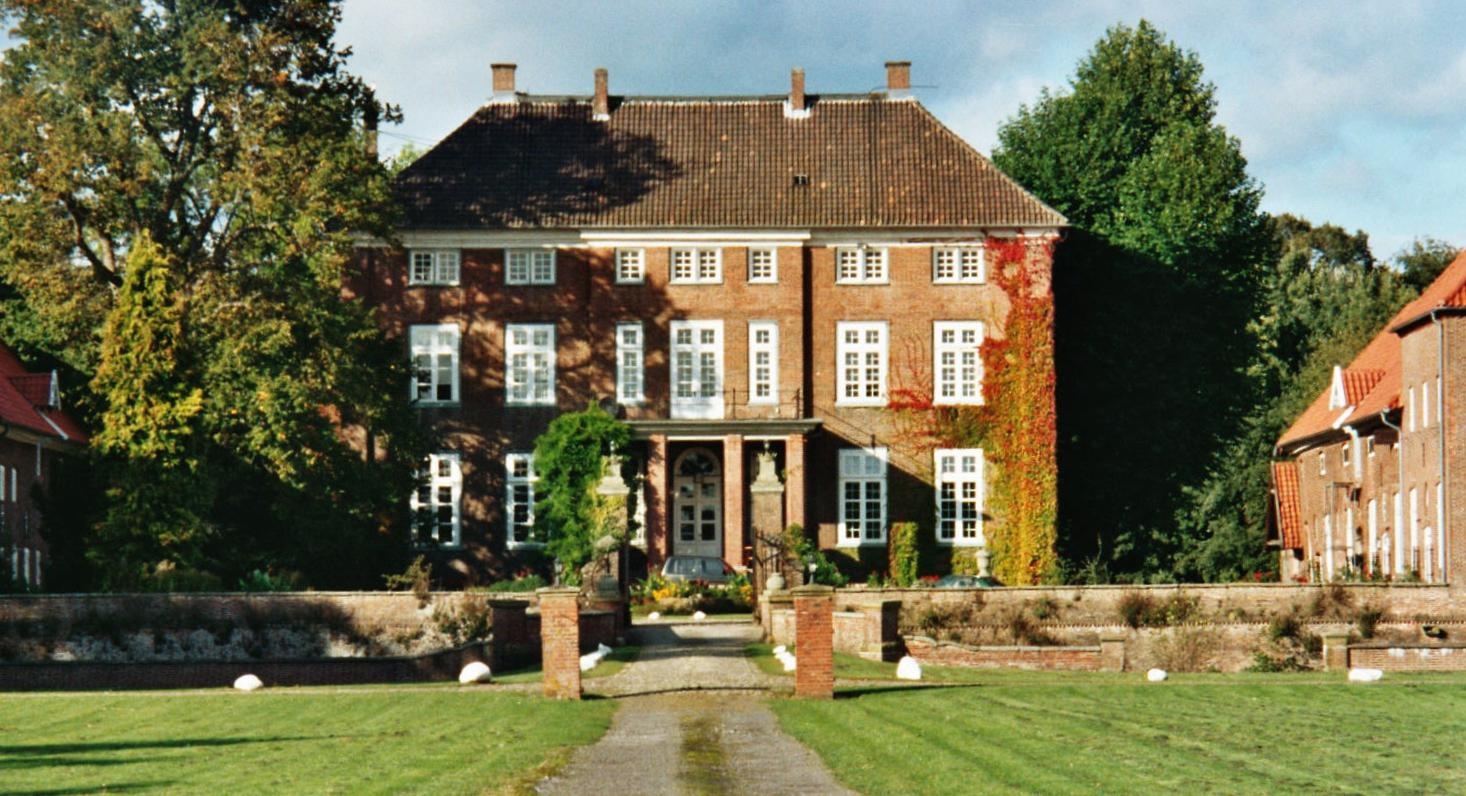
House Loxten

== Notable people ==
- Hermann Kemper (1892-1977), German engineer and pioneer in magnetic levitation.
- Ernst von Hammerstein-Loxten (1827-1914), prussian agrarian minister
- Ludwig von Hammerstein-Loxten (1839-1927), prussian general
- Rudolf von Hammerstein (1735-1811), Lieutenant general in the Electorate of Hanover
