= Thomas Nipperdey =

German historian (1927–1992)

Thomas Nipperdey (27 October 1927, Cologne – 14 June 1992, Munich) was a German historian best known for his monumental and exhaustive studies of Germany from 1800 to 1918. As a critical follower of Leopold von Ranke's famous ideal of writing "history exactly as it happened", Nipperdey sought to explain the interconnectedness of political, social and cultural developments, while avoiding partisanship and rejecting moralistic efforts to see German history before 1933 only in the light of Nazism.

== Career ==
Nipperdey was born in Cologne and studied philosophy, history, and German philology at the University of Göttingen, the University of Cambridge, and the University of Cologne, where he obtained a PhD in 1953. He taught history at the University of Göttingen (1961–63), the University of Karlsruhe (TH) (1963–1967), the Free University of Berlin (1967–1971), and at LMU Munich (1971–1992). He is best known for his multi-volume history of Germany from 1800 to 1918. He also published widely in the fields of Reformation history and religious history, as well as in the political history of the 19th and 20th centuries, including the history of German political parties. Among his students were Martin Baumeister and Andreas Daum.

== Ideas ==
Nipperdey was a persistent opponent of the "critical school" of German historians who saw the underlying feudal and authoritarian political and social structures of the German Empire during the 19th century as paving the way for the triumph of Hitler's National Socialism in 1933. In a series of essays, Nipperdey rejected this view and argued that the 19th century was best seen in its own right.

While he never finished a book on the post-1918 era, he wrote articles that analyze the phenomena of National Socialism in terms of modernization theory. He studied the preconditions, processes, and stages of several crises of modernisation in 19th and 20th century Germany, and attempted to interpret the rise of fascism in terms of the interplay and interdependence of modernizing and antimodern forces in society. He argued that Nazism was radically anti-modernist and archaic in its ideology and policy, and yet paradoxically modernist in political style and in the use of political means. For example, it made effective use of newspapers, films, and mass rallies, demonstrating a firm grasp of the latest propaganda techniques. An unintended result was a greater leveling of German society, even though Nazism rejected the ideal of equality of man and made no effort to end the traditional hierarchical class structure of German society.

Nipperdey generally emphasizes broad social forces, and the role of individuals in history. He sometimes provided an incisive psychological portrait of a major figure, such as Kaiser Wilhelm II. Nipperdey describes him as:

"gifted, with a quick understanding, sometimes brilliant, with a taste for the modern – technology, industry, science – but at the same time superficial, hasty, restless, unable to relax, without any deeper level of seriousness, without any desire for hard work or drive to see things through to the end, without any sense of sobriety, for balance and boundaries, or even for reality and real problems, uncontrollable and scarcely capable of learning from experience, desperate for applause and success — as Bismarck said early on in his life, he wanted every day to be his birthday — romantic, sentimental and theatrical, unsure and arrogant, with an immeasurably exaggerated self-confidence and desire to show off, a juvenile cadet, who never took the tone of the officers’ mess out of his voice, and brashly wanted to play the part of the supreme warlord, full of panicky fear of a monotonous life without any diversions, and yet aimless, pathological in his hatred against his English mother."

== Books ==
Nipperdey was best known for the massive three-volume history, Deutsche Geschichte 1800–1866: Bürgerwelt und starker Staat (1983); Deutsche Geschichte 1866–1918, vol. 1: Arbeitswelt und Bürgergeist (1990); and Deutsche Geschichte 1866–1918. vol. 2: Machtstaat vor der Demokratie (1992). Only the first volume has been translated into English as Germany from Napoleon to Bismarck, by Daniel Nolan (1996). The English translation published by Princeton University Press is available online.

The opus starts, "In the beginning was Napoleon" and runs 2500 pages. It contains few footnotes, illustrations or tables. Instead, it offers a river of text 1.5 million words in all. Nipperdey uses dense description and analysis rather than telling stories and anecdotes. He tries to synthesize a wide range of topics from everyday life, social history, cultural themes, and monuments, to industry and economics, urbanization, political parties, religion, high-level military diplomacy, and warfare. For Nipperdey "the 'colour' of history is grey, grey in all its infinite shades".

The range of topics is suggested by the chapter outline of volume 1:

- I. The Great Upheaval. 1. The End of Empire: Germany under Napoleon. 2. The Great Reforms. 3. The Great War and a Difficult Peace
  - II. Life, Work, Business. 1. Population. 2. Family, Gender, Generations. 3. Everyday Life. 4. Agriculture and Rural Society. 5. Industrialisation. 6. Crafts. 7. The Lower Classes, Factories, Industrial Workers, Social Problems. 8. The Problem of Minorities: the Jews. 9. Bourgeois Society
  - III. Restoration and Vormarz, 1815–48. 1. The End of the Reforms: Constitutions and Restoration. 2. The Great Movements. 3. The State and the States. 4. German and European Politics. 5. The Effects of the July Revolution. 6. The Formation and Restructuring of the German Political Parties. 7. Vormarz
  - IV. Faith and Knowledge; Education and Art. 1. Religion, Church, De-Christianisation. 2. Education: School and University. 3. The Sciences. 4. Aesthetic Culture: Music, Art and Literature. 5. The Reading Revolution and the Rise of the Press.
