= Hans von Hammerstein-Loxten =

German politician (1843–1905)

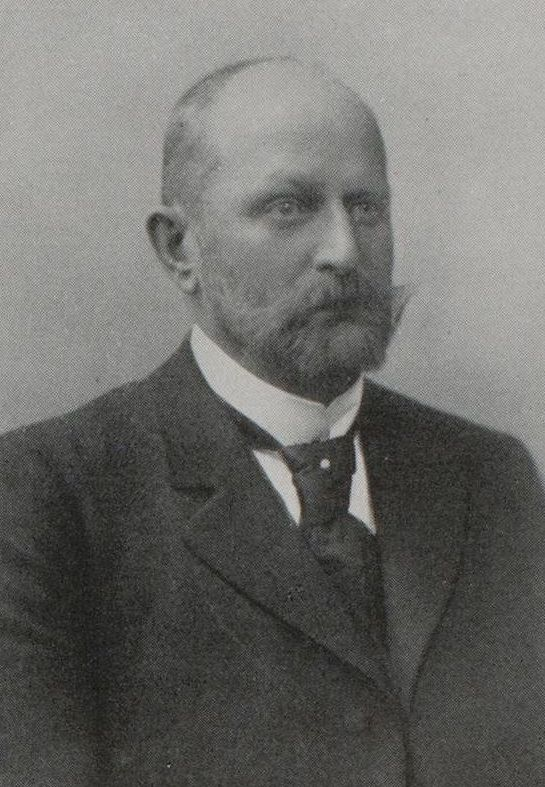

Prussian Minister of the Interior
- In office 1901–1905
- Monarch: Wilhelm II
- Prime Minister: Bernhard von Bülow
- Preceded by: Georg von Rheinbaben
- Succeeded by: Theobald von Bethmann Hollweg

Personal details
- Born: Hans Christian Friedrich Wilhelm von Hammerstein-Loxten; 27 April 1843 Lüneburg, Kingdom of Hanover
- Died: 20 March 1905 (aged 61) Berlin
- Spouse: Marie Elisabeth Charlotte von Rabiel
- Parent(s): Wilhelm von Hammerstein; Julia von dem Knesebeck

Hans Christian Friedrich Wilhelm, Freiherr von Hammerstein-Loxten (April 27, 1843 – March 20, 1905) was a Prussian civil servant and politician who served as Interior Minister.

== Early life ==
Hammerstein-Loxten was born on April 27, 1843, in Lüneburg in the Kingdom of Hanover. He came from the younger branch of the Loxten line of the Hammerstein noble family. He was a son of Julia, Baroness von dem Knesebeck (1811–1889), and Wilhelm von Hammerstein (1808–1872), who served as Minister of Finance and Interior in Hanover, until 1865, and then Minister of State in Mecklenburg-Strelitz until 1872.

His maternal grandfather was Hanoverian Major-General Friedrich August Wilhelm von dem Knesebeck. His uncles included Maj.-Gen. Bernhard von dem Knesebeck, (Note: Maj.-Gen. Bernhard von dem Knesebeck (1817–1887) was a senior field commander during the Austro-Prussian War in 1866 and the Franco-Prussian War in 1871 who served as Commandant of Erfurt.) and Lt.-Gen. Ernst Julius Georg von dem Knesebeck. Distantly related to Ernst von Hammerstein-Loxten, his paternal grandparents were Dorothea Agnies Sophie von Plato and landowner and soldier Christian von Hammerstein.

He studied law in Heidelberg, Bonn and Göttingen.

== Career ==
In 1864 he passed the auditor's examination in Hanover. In 1866 he became Federal War Commissioner for the Hanoverian Army. After the annexation of 1866 where it became the Prussian Province of Hanover, he entered the Prussian judicial service and after the Franco-Prussian War into the service of the judiciary of Alsace-Lorraine. From 1869 he was an assessor with the government in Koblenz, in 1870 with the government in Nancy, in 1871 with the government in Strasbourg and in 1871 he was appointed district director in the Colmar district. He later switched to an administrative career. Between 1878 and 1883, Hammerstein-Loxten was district and police director in Mulhouse. He then became district president of the District of Lorraine, based in Metz. In 1896 he was appointed Real Privy Councilor. From 1901 until his death, Hammerstein-Loxten was the Prussian Minister of the Interior. He was also a member of the State Council and a representative of the Federal Council.

Hammerstein-Loxten took a tough line in Polish policy. The police and administration were strictly anti-Polish, especially in the eastern provinces. The settlement policy was intended to Germanize Polish areas. The language policy he helped to implement led to the Wreschen school strike in 1906. Hammerstein-Loxten basically acted in the spirit of Bernhard von Bülow, but the Interior Minister's uncompromising manner often went too far for the prime minister.

== Personal life ==
On September 14, 1872, Hammerstein married Marie Elisabeth Charlotte von Rabiel (1849–1922). Together, they were the parents of:

- Günther von Hammerstein-Loxten (1885–1963), who was a board member of the headquarters of the Debt Relief Associations of the German East GmbH in Berlin.

Baron von Hammerstein-Loxten died on March 20, 1905, in Berlin.

== Honors and legacy ==
Hammersteinstrasse (German: Hammersteinstraße) in Berlin was named after Hammerstein-Loxten - along with other streets that were dedicated to Prussian ministers in connection with the exploitation of the Dahlem domain.
