= Wilhelm-Orden =

Imperial and Royal Order of Wilhelm Kaiserlich und Königlich Orden von Wilhelm
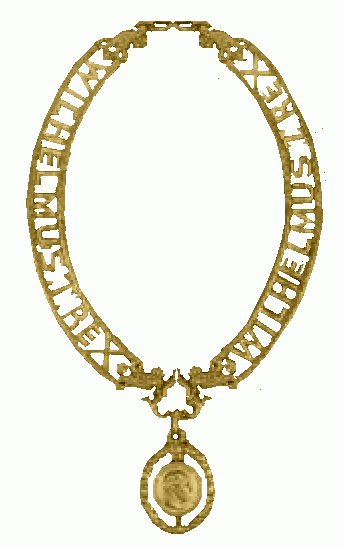
- Collar of the Order

Awarded by (German Empire) Head of the House of Prussia
- Type: State Order (formerly); House Order (currently)
- Royal house: House of Prussia
- Ribbon: White with a Black stripe in the middle and either side
- Status: Unconstituted
- Sovereign: Georg Friedrich, Prince of Prussia
- Grades: Knight With Collar; Knight/Dame Commander; Knight/Dame Officer; Knight/Dame

Precedence
- Next (higher): Order of Louise
- The Ribbon of the Order

The Imperial and Royal Order of Wilhelm (in English "William-Order") was instituted on 18 January 1896 by the German Emperor and King of Prussia Willhelm II as a high civilian award, and was dedicated to the memory of his grandfather Emperor William I "the Great".

== Insignia ==
The insignia of the Order consisted of a golden medal with the portrait of William I, surrounded by a golden wreath and suspended from a heavy golden collar. This collar with a weight of 222 grams bore the words WIRKE IM ANDENKEN AN KAISER WILHELM DEN GROSSEN (English: "Work in the memory of Emperor William the Great") and was designed by the jewellers Emil Weigand and Otto Schultz.

== List of recipients ==
The order was very exclusive. One of the first to be decorated was Otto von Bismarck. Also among the recipients were:

- Heinrich von Stephan, General Post Director - 1896.
- Count Arthur von Posadowsky-Wehner, politician - 27 January 1900 - on the occasion of the Emperor´s birthday.
- Princess Marie Elisabeth of Saxe-Meiningen, musician and composer - 28 August 1913 - the last recipient of the Order.

== See also ==
There are other decorations with this or a similar name:

- The highest decoration for valour in the Netherlands is the Military Order of William (1815)
- The elector of Hesse-Kassel (or Hesse-Cassel) instituted a "Wilhelmsorden" in 1851 in honor of Friedrich Wilhelm I of Hesse.
