= Adolf von Scholz =

German army officer and politician

Adolf Heinrich Wilhelm von Scholz
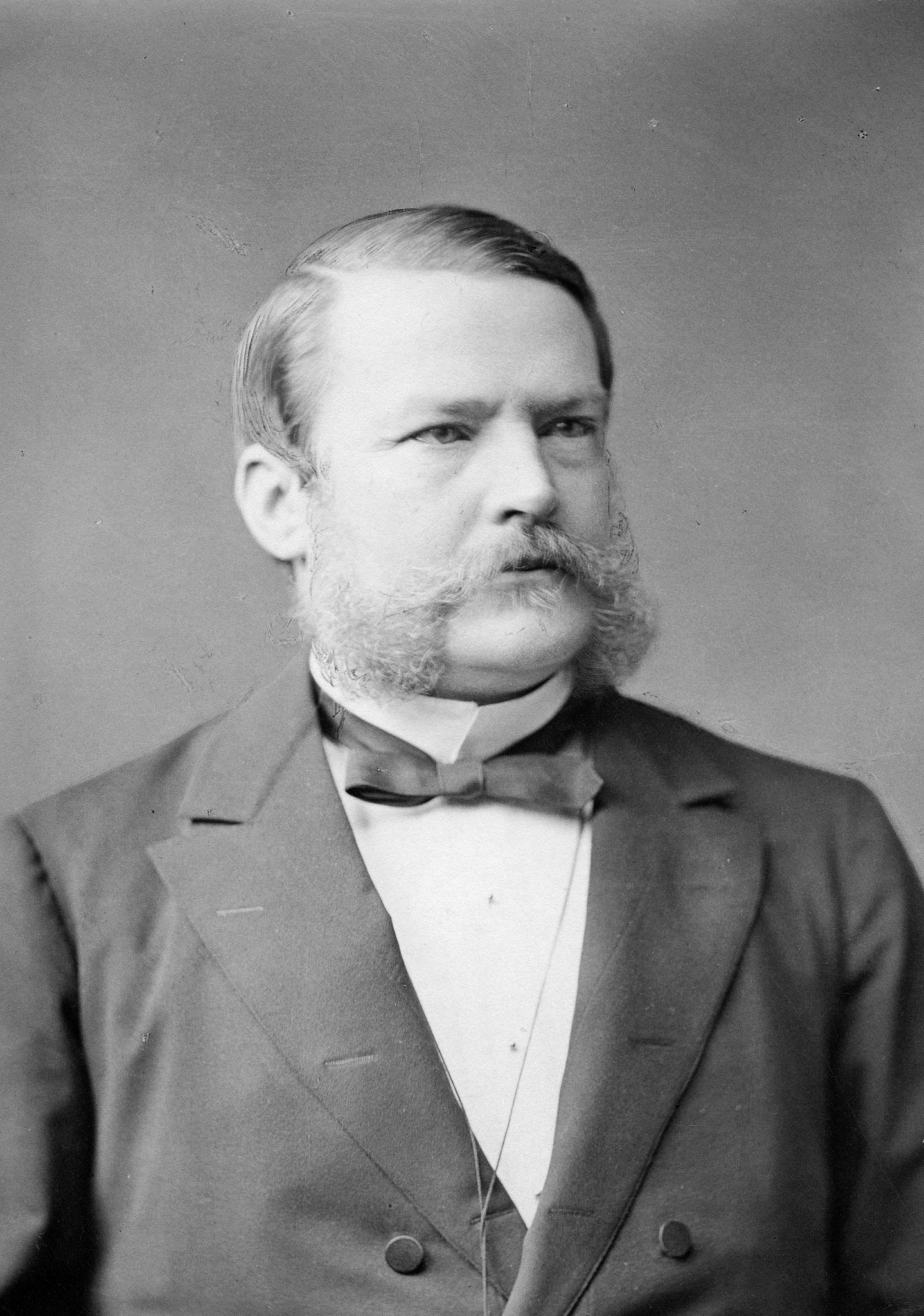

Secretary for the Treasury of Germany
- In office 1880–1882
- Preceded by: Position established
- Succeeded by: Franz Emil Emanuel von Burchard

Minister of Finance of the Kingdom of Prussia
- In office 1882–1890
- Preceded by: Karl Hermann Bitter
- Succeeded by: Johannes von Miquel

Personal details
- Born: Adolf Heinrich Wilhelm Scholz; 1 November 1833 Schweidnitz, Kingdom of Prussia
- Died: 20 March 1924 (aged 90) Konstanz, Republic of Baden, Weimar Germany
- Other political affiliations: German Conservative Party
- Children: Wilhelm von Scholz (son)

Military service
- Years of service: 1864–1871
- Rank: Colonel (Oberst)
- Unit: 49th Cavalry Regiment
- Battles/wars: Franco-Prussian War

Adolf Heinrich Wilhelm Scholz, since 1883 Adolf Heinrich Wilhelm von Scholz (born 1 November 1833 in Schweidnitz, died 20 March 1924 at Schloss Seeheim, Constance) was a German army officer and politician. From 1864 to 1871 he was colonel of the 49th Regiment of Cavalry and retired after the Franco-Prussian War to a more peaceful role in politics. He served as Secretary for the Treasury of Germany from 1880 to 1882. In July 1882 he became Minister of Finance of the Kingdom of Prussia and served in this office until 1890.

He bought the Schloss Seeheim in Konstanz from Ernst Lang in 1885. His son was the author Wilhelm von Scholz.

== Publications ==
- Erlebnisse und Gespräche mit Bismarck, Stuttgart und Berlin 1922, J. G. Cotta′sche Buchhandlung Nachfolger, 150 S., 1 Abb.

== Literature ==
- Andreas Thier (2007). "Scholz, Adolf von". Neue Deutsche Biographie (in German). Vol. 23. Berlin: Duncker & Humblot. p. 451.

Political offices
Preceded by First secretary	Secretary for the Treasury of Germany; 1880–1882	Succeeded by Franz Emil Emanuel von Burchard
Preceded by Karl Hermann Bitter	Minister of Finance of the Kingdom of Prussia; 1882–1890	Succeeded by Johannes von Miquel
