= Wichard von Moellendorff (engineer) =

German engineer and economist

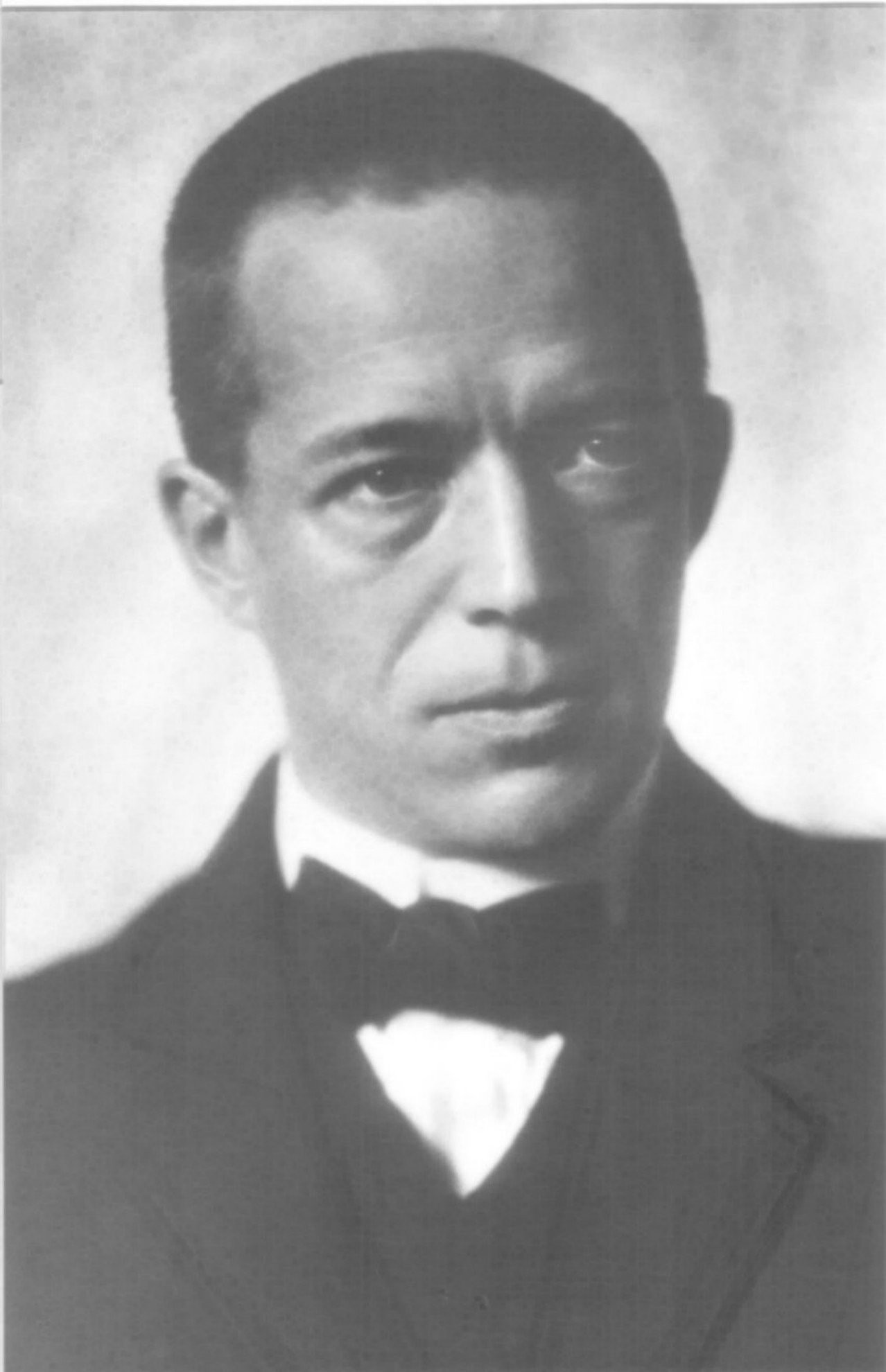
Wichard von Moellendorff

Wichard von Moellendorff (3 October 1881 in Hong Kong – 4 May 1937 in Berlin) was a German engineer and economist. He is best known for his involvement in shaping economic policy during and after the First World War. He was also involved in materials research.

In 1916, Moellendorff developed the concept of a "social economy", a variant of socialism that prioritizes the interests of the society as a whole over private interests, rather than eliminating private property altogether. He envisioned implementing this concept through an organisation similar to Bismarck's National Economic Council (Volkswirschaftsrat). Moellendorff saw this approach as a way to establish a "rejuvenated middle class".

Following the German Revolution of November 1918, von Moellendorff was under-secretary to the Reichsminister für Wirtschaft (Minister for Economic Affairs) Rudolf Wissell. Together they were involved in developing a programme of "practical socialisation" based on corporatist principles which they claimed was superior both to capitalism and Marxist socialism. However, their programme was rejected in the summer of 1919, and he abandoned any hopes of the imminent realisation of what he described as "conservative socialism".

== Works ==
- (1916) Deutsche Gemeinwirtschaft (Berlin, Privately circulated "in ministries and imperial departments, in the offices of large enterprises and in various political clubs")
- (1917) Von Einst zu Einst: der alte Fritz, J. G. Fichte, Freiherr vom Stein, Friedrich List, Fürst Bismarck, Paul Lagarde über deutsche Gemeinwirtschaft (Jena: E. Diedrichs)
- (1918) Die neue Wirtschaft (Berlin)
- (1932) Konservativer Sozialismus (Hamburg: Hanseatische Verlags-Anstalt)
