= Leo von Caprivi =

Chancellor of the German Empire from 1890 to 1894

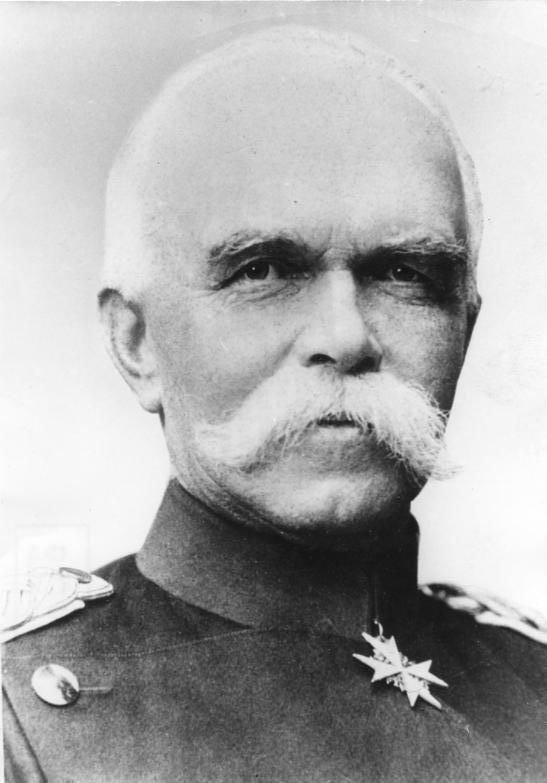
- Caprivi in 1880

Chancellor of the German Empire
- In office 18 March 1890 – 26 October 1894
- Monarch: Wilhelm II
- Deputy: Karl Heinrich von Boetticher
- Preceded by: Otto von Bismarck
- Succeeded by: Chlodwig von Hohenlohe-Schillingsfürst

Minister President of Prussia
- In office 18 March 1890 – 22 March 1892
- Monarch: Wilhelm II
- Preceded by: Otto von Bismarck
- Succeeded by: Botho zu Eulenburg

Chief of the Imperial Admiralty
- In office 20 March 1883 – 5 July 1888
- Chancellor: Otto von Bismarck
- Preceded by: Albrecht von Stosch
- Succeeded by: Alexander von Monts

Personal details
- Born: Georg Leo von Caprivi; 24 February 1831 Berlin, Kingdom of Prussia (Now Germany)
- Died: 6 February 1899 (aged 67) Skyren, Prussia, German Empire (Now Skórzyn, Poland)
- Party: Independent
- Awards: Pour le Mérite

Military service
- Allegiance: Prussia; German Confederation; North German Confederation; German Empire
- Branch/service: Prussian Army
- Years of service: 1849–1888
- Rank: General der Infanterie; Vize Admiral
- Battles/wars: Second Schleswig War; Austro-Prussian War

Georg Leo Graf von Caprivi de Caprara de Montecuccoli (English: Count George Leo of Caprivi, Caprara, and Montecuccoli; born Georg Leo von Caprivi; 24 February 1831 – 6 February 1899) was a German general and statesman. He served as the imperial chancellor of the German Empire from March 1890 to October 1894, succeeding longtime chancellor Otto von Bismarck.

Caprivi was born into a Prussian noble family of Italian origin. After graduating from the Prussian Staff College, he rapidly rose through the ranks and distinguished himself in particular during the Franco-Prussian War, where he served as chief of staff of the X Army Corps. In 1883, he was appointed chief of the Imperial German Navy, but upon the ascension of Wilhelm II he quickly came into conflict with the Emperor, who envisioned an offensive navy capable of challenging the British. He resigned in 1888 and returned to the Imperial German Army.

In 1890, Wilhelm forced Bismarck's resignation and named Caprivi chancellor; he simultaneously became minister-president of Prussia. During his tenure, Caprivi promoted industrial and commercial development, and attempted to reconcile opposing domestic forces through a series of social reforms. As part of Wilhelm's "new course" in foreign policy, Caprivi abandoned Bismarck's military and political alignment with the Russian Empire by electing not to renew the Reinsurance Treaty. He aimed to forge closer ties with Britain, acquiring for Germany the archipelago of Heligoland and the Caprivi Strip in southern Africa in exchange for recognizing British authority in Zanzibar, though improvement of relations ultimately did not result in an alliance. Caprivi also pursued an aggressive trade policy and concluded numerous bilateral treaties for reduction of tariff barriers, reversing the protectionist policies implemented by his predecessor.

Caprivi's policies were met with significant domestic opposition, particularly from right-wing nationalists, pro-colonial groups and large landowners. The failure of his educational reforms marked the beginning of his downfall and led to his resignation as Prussian minister-president in 1892. His position becoming more untenable as conflict arose over a new military bill, Wilhelm dismissed him as Chancellor in 1894, after which he withdrew from public life.

== Early life ==
Leo von Caprivi was born in Charlottenburg (then a town in the Prussian Province of Brandenburg, today a district of Berlin), the son of jurist Julius Leopold von Caprivi (1797–1865), who later became a judge at the Prussian supreme court and member of the Prussian House of Lords. His father's family was of Italian origin (Caprara Montecuccoli, from Modena). The Caprivis were ennobled during the 17th century Ottoman–Habsburg wars. They later moved to Landau in Silesia. His mother was Emilie Köpke, daughter of Gustav Köpke, headmaster of the Berlinisches Gymnasium zum Grauen Kloster and teacher of Caprivi's predecessor Otto von Bismarck. Caprivi's brother was lieutenant general Raimund von Caprivi and his nephew, Leo von Caprivi was an aide-de-camp to Emperor Wilhelm II.

Caprivi's origins differentiated him from the majority of the Prussian upper class, since he was not a large landowner. Accordingly, he later described himself as "without are and straw." He was a Protestant. On a personal level, Leo von Caprivi was an affable man with few close friends, who remained unmarried.

== Military career ==
=== Rise ===
Caprivi was educated at the Friedrichswerdersches Gymnasium in Berlin. After graduating in 1849, he enlisted in the 2nd (Emperor Francis) Guards Grenadiers of the Prussian Army. As a second lieutenant, he attended the Prussian Staff College and from 1860 he was a Hauptmann in the topographic division of the German General Staff. He served in the Second Schleswig War of 1864 as a member of the staff of the 5th Division and in 1865 he was made the commander of an infantry company. He served in the Austro-Prussian War of 1866 as a major in the staff of Prince Friedrich Karl of Prussia. Afterwards he was appointed to the general staff of the Guards Corps and then in spring 1870 he was temporarily appointed chief of staff of the X Army Corps.

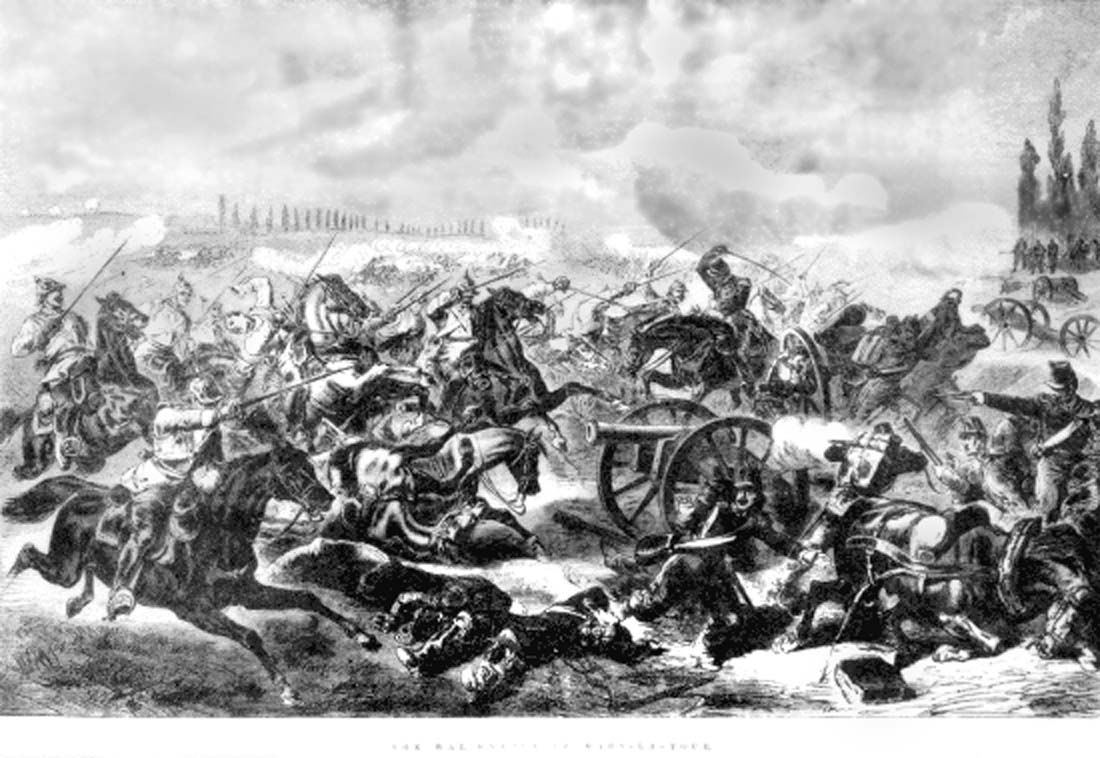
Contemporary press image of the Battle of Mars-la-Tour

Caprivi had gained a reputation as one of the most gifted students of Helmuth von Moltke and was confirmed in his post as chief of the general staff of the X Army Corps with the rank of lieutenant colonel during the Franco-Prussian War. This appointment brought the comparatively young Caprivi to public attention. During the war, he distinguished himself at the Battle of Mars-la-Tour, the Siege of Metz and the Battle of Beaune-la-Rolande, receiving the military order Pour le Mérite.

=== Chief of the Navy ===
After the war Caprivi first served as a department head in the Prussian War Ministry. There he was involved in drafting a law about barracks and in the introduction of the Mauser rifle. From 1878 he was placed in charge of a range of different divisions in rapid succession. In 1882, he became commander of the 30th Infantry Division at Metz.

In 1883, he succeeded Albrecht von Stosch, a fierce opponent of Chancellor Bismarck, as Chief of the Imperial Navy, with the rank of Vice-admiral. According to Robert K. Massie, this appointment was made by Bismarck and caused great dissatisfaction among the officers of the navy. He says that at the time of Caprivi's appointment, he "had no interest in naval affairs and did not know the names of his officers or the emblems of rank on the uniforms they wore." According to Thomas Nipperdey, the appointment was made against the express wishes of Bismarck, who had not wanted the Prussian Army to lose one of its best officers. He refers to Caprivi's appointment as a "deportation to the navy." In 1884, Caprivi was appointed to the State Council.

Caprivi showed significant administrative talent, in reforming and expanding the German navy. Caprivi emphasized the development and construction of torpedo boats during his tenure as naval chief. He submitted two long memoranda to the Reichstag regarding the interests of the fleet. When Wilhelm II became emperor in 1888, he made naval politics one of his personal concerns and Caprivi quickly came into conflict with the Emperor. Up to this point administration of the navy and naval military command had both been invested in the Admiralty; Wilhelm wished to separate them. Even more importantly, Wilhelm wanted an offensive navy with large battleships, which could compete with the English on the high seas. Meanwhile, Caprivi supported a traditional continental military policy, in which the fleet played an entirely defensive role. After being overruled on the issue by the Kaiser, Caprivi resigned in 1888. He was briefly appointed to the command of his old army corps, the X Army Corps stationed in Hanover.

== Chancellor of Germany ==
Office	Incumbent	In office	Party
Imperial Chancellor	Leo von Caprivi	20 March 1890 – 26 October 1894	None
Vice-Chancellor of Germany; Secretary for the Interior	Karl von Boetticher	20 March 1890 – 26 October 1894	None
Secretary for the Foreign Affairs	Herbert von Bismarck	20 March 1890 – 26 March 1890	None
Secretary for the Foreign Affairs	Adolf von Bieberstein	26 March 1890 – 26 October 1894	None
Secretary for the Treasury	Helmuth von Maltzahn	20 March 1890 – 26 October 1894	None
Secretary for the Justice	Otto von Oehlschläger	20 March 1890 – 2 February 1891	None
Secretary for the Justice	Robert Bosse	2 February 1891 – 2 March 1892	None
Secretary for the Justice	Eduard Hanauer	2 March 1892 – 10 July 1893	None
Secretary for the Justice	Rudolf Arnold Nieberding	10 July 1893 – 26 October 1894	None
Secretary for the Navy	Karl Eduard Heusner	26 March 1890 – 22 April 1890	None
Secretary for the Navy	Friedrich von Hollmann	22 April 1890 – 26 October 1894	None
Secretary for the Post	Heinrich von Stephan	20 March 1890 – 26 October 1894	None

In February 1890, Caprivi was summoned to Berlin by Emperor Wilhelm II and informed that he was Wilhelm's intended candidate to replace Bismarck as Chancellor, if the latter resisted Wilhelm's proposed changes to the government. Upon Bismarck's dismissal on 18 March, Caprivi became chancellor of Germany and Minister President of Prussia. Though his exact motives are unknown, Wilhelm appears to have viewed Caprivi as a moderate who would make a sufficiently strong replacement for Bismarck, should the former chancellor make trouble in retirement, yet lacked the ambition to seriously oppose the throne. For his part, Caprivi was unenthusiastic, yet felt duty-bound to obey the Emperor. He said to one gathering, "I know that I shall be covered in mud, that I shall fall ingloriously". After his appointment, Caprivi wrote in the Berliner Tageblatt that the main task of Bismarck's successor would be "to lead the nation back after the preceding epoch of great men and deeds to an everyday existence."

Caprivi's administration was marked by moves towards conciliation of the Social Democrats on the domestic front, and towards a pro-British foreign policy. This approach is known to historians as the "Neuer Kurs" ("New Course"), a term coined by Wilhelm II in 1890.

The American historian Robert K. Massie characterises Caprivi at the time of his appointment as follows:

Caprivi, fifty-nine, was the model Prussian officer. He lived a Spartan life, had never married, did not smoke, and had few inimate friends and few enemies. He read history and spoke fluent English. His movements were quiet, his manner open and friendly, his language sensible. With a large round head, fringe of white hair, and sweeping mustache, he was, The Times told its readers, "a typical Teuton of the hugest and most impressive type. He might very well pass for a brother, or even a double of Prince Bismarck himself.

Caprivi promised at the beginning of his tenure "To adopt what is good, wherever and whomever it comes from, if it is compatible with the national interest." However, the important economic policies of his government derived from the ideas of Johannes von Miquel, leader of the National Liberals. In various areas, including social policy, reforms were announced. Within Prussia, Caprivi's most important collaborators were the trade minister Hans Hermann von Berlepsch, the interior minister Ernst Ludwig Herrfurth, and the war minister Hans von Kaltenborn-Stachau. At the imperial level, his key allies were the Secretary for the Interior Karl von Boetticher and Secretary for the Foreign Affairs Adolf von Bieberstein. Caprivi's policy of moderation had clear limits; the authority of the monarchy and the state was not to be diminished. Legal restrictions of rights of association, for example, were not removed, the disciplinary rules for Beamte were strengthened, and appointments in the judiciary went to trusted conservatives. Nipperdey characterises this policy as "enlightened bureaucratic-conservatism."

In order to carry out his political agenda, Caprivi, like Bismarck before him, required the approval of the Reichstag. A new factor, however, was that the Emperor now wished to exercise direct political influence. His changing positions and apparently absolutist desires became a decisive political factor from the time of Caprivi's appointment onwards. Opposition from Bismarck also remained a significant factor. A further problem for Caprivi was the relationship between the German Empire and Prussia. Unlike Bismarck, Caprivi's leadership style within the Prussian State Ministry was markedly collegial. This change was made clear even in his appointment speech in the Prussian House of Representatives. Unlike Bismarck, he never demanded to be present with the emperor when one of his ministers was exercising his rights of immediate authority. However, this made it more difficult for him to get political policies implemented and allowed the Prussian finance minister Miquel to gain influence well beyond his area of authority.

=== Foreign Policy ===
==== Ending the Reinsurance Treaty ====
Only a week into office, Caprivi was forced to choose whether to renew the Reinsurance Treaty, a secret alliance Bismarck had made with Russia. Although he was a military man, war was not a political option for Caprivi and he opposed General Alfred von Waldersee's proposal for Germany to ally with Austria-Hungary and carry out a preventive war against Russia. Nevertheless, he followed the decision of officials of the Foreign Office around Friedrich von Holstein not to renew the Reinsurance Treaty and focus on a more straightforward alliance with Austria-Hungary. Unaware of the Foreign Office's determination, Wilhelm II had personally assured Russian Ambassador Count Pavel Andreyevich Shuvalov that the treaty would be renewed. When Caprivi discussed the issue with the Emperor, Wilhelm II yielded to his Chancellor, unwilling to dismiss another chancellor one week after dismissing Bismarck. The treaty was not renewed, and Shuvalov was shocked at the sudden reversal.

The decision led to the Reinsurance Treaty becoming public knowledge for the first time and prompted sharp criticism from supporters of Bismarck. In the press, Caprivi was subsequently attacked as a dilettante in foreign policy. Several historians have argued that this decision caused the encirclement of Germany which finally led to it fighting on two fronts in the First World War. However, the German relationship with Russia had already deteriorated in the final years of Bismarck's chancellorship, especially as a result of trade disputes regarding Russian agricultural exports. At the same time, strong forces in Russian politics were already pushing for a rapprochement with France in the late 1880s. It is unclear that renewing the Reinsurance Treaty could have overcome these factors. Although the ending of the Reinsurance Treaty was not the beginning of the crisis in German-Russian relations, it did have considerable consequences. In 1893 and 1894, Russia forged the Alliance with France and Germany was thus more closely committed to Austria-Hungary. Thus, the decision contributed to the formation of competing power blocks in Europe.

In place of the Reinsurance Treaty, Caprivi pursued the Triple Alliance with Austria-Hungary and Italy. He then sought to expand this through good relations with Britain.

==== Colonial policy ====
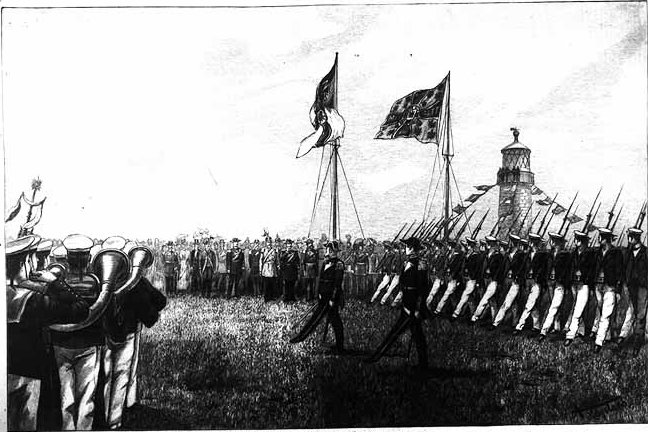
Parade for the annexation of Heligoland

Success in Caprivi's pro-British policy was exemplified by the Heligoland–Zanzibar Treaty of July 1890, which had been largely prepared under Bismarck. In this treaty, the British gave Germany the small island of Heligoland in the North Sea and a strip of land named the Caprivi Strip after him, which was added to German South West Africa, thus linking that territory with the Zambezi River. Caprivi's goal in acquiring Heligoland was to secure the German North Sea coast and he hoped that the Caprivi strip would allow Germany to use the Zambezi for trade and communications with eastern Africa (the river proved to be unnavigable). In return, Germany gave up its protectorate over Wituland and Zanzibar in East Africa. More generally, the treaty was intended as a signal to Britain that Germany did not seek to challenge its status as the dominant colonial power. Caprivi hoped that the treaty would be the beginning of closer relations between the two countries, culminating in an alliance. The British also wanted closer relations, but Caprivi's government failed to make an agreement. This was partially due to conflicting approaches and interests in the Ottoman Empire. The treaty also sparked opposition to Caprivi within Germany from colonialist pressure-groups like the Alldeutscher Verband.

In general, Caprivi did not believe that Germany should compete with other powers for overseas colonies but rather should focus on its position within Europe, since he did not think that Germany would be able to defend an extensive colonial empire against the British in the event of a war. As a result, he did not support expansion of the German Colonial Empire.

==== Trade policy ====
Caprivi pursued an aggressive trade policy, saying "either we export goods or we export men." In his view, German Great Power status was not sustainable in the long-term without a powerful industrial sector. He also considered trade policy part of general foreign policy and sought to bind other countries to Germany politically through commercial treaties. A tightly intertwined "economic area of 130 million men" was meant to prevent the outbreak of military conflicts. He obtained commercial treaties with Austria, Italy, Switzerland, Spain, Serbia, Romania, Belgium, and Russia. These treaties reduced protective agricultural tariffs, which lowered the price of food in Germany. They also assisted the expansion of German trade through exports of industrial products.

In sum, Caprivi's approach marked the end of the protectionist Schutzzollpolitik of the later part of Bismarck's chancellorship, but it was far from being a policy of free trade. Caprivi's policy enjoyed the support of a majority in the Reichstag and Wilhelm II cited his economic policies as grounds for his decision to promote Caprivi to the status of Count. This general support subsided quickly after Caprivi ended the trade war with Russia in 1894. This not only allowed the export of German industrial products but also a limited increase in agricultural imports to Germany. The damaged relationship with Russia was clearly improved, but internally it brought fierce opposition from agriculturalists.

Opponents were angry at the downplaying of German agriculture in favor of urban workers. Led by East Elbian Junkers, a coalition emerged that included peasant farmers, artisans, and conservative intellectuals hostile to the emerging industrial society. They demanded the Kaiser remove Caprivi. The Agrarian League was launched in 1893 to protest the reduction in tariffs against imported grains. The league was organized nationally like a political party, with local chapters, centralized discipline, and a clear-cut platform. It fought against free trade, industrialization, and liberalism. Its most hated enemy was socialism, which it blamed on Jewish financial capitalism. The League helped establish grassroots anti-Semitism of the sort that flourished into the 1930s.

=== Domestic policy ===
==== Policy of compromise ====
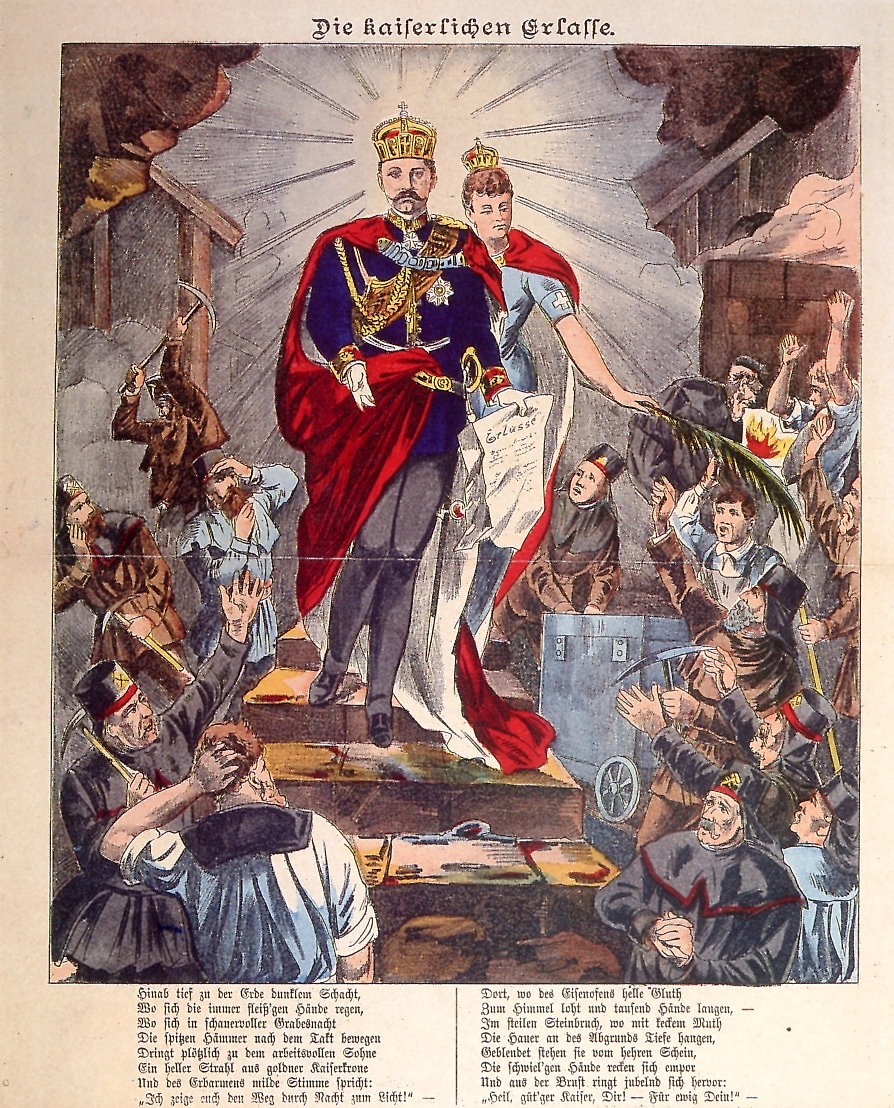
"The February Concessions": idealised depiction of Wilhelm II and the announcement of a "social empire" (Neuruppin print from 1890)

Caprivi saw the state as a monarchical-social authority, based on Christian traditions. He sought to include all political parties through a balance of opposing domestic viewpoints. This was welcomed in the Reichstag and in public discourse. Caprivi saw himself as a kind of mediator between the crown and the Reichstag. However, he could not rely on the support of a strong party in the Reichstag and had to cobble together regularly shifting majorities. Nonetheless, the policy of compromise (Politik des Ausgleichs) initially had a real chance of success.

He attempted not only to win the support of civic liberals and conservative forces, but also to forge a working arrangement with representatives of the Poles and the recently annexed Province of Hanover in the Reichstag. The abolition of the Welfenfonds decreased tension with the German-Hanoverian Party. Caprivi believed that the support of the Poles would be required in the event of a war with Russia and - more immediately - he needed the votes of their representatives in the Reichstag. He made concessions on the question of Polish language use in schools, eased work of Polish cooperative banks, and permitted a Polish archbishop for Poznań and Gniezno. However, the policy did not survive Caprivi's resignation and had no enduring consequences.

More consequential were his overtures to the Centre Party and the Social Democrats. By reimbursing the Catholic Church for state money that had been frozen during the Kulturkampf, Caprivi sought to win over the Catholic camp represented by the Centre Party. He conciliated the SPD by abandoning any attempt to renew the Anti-Socialist Laws and announcing reforms to the Prussian three-class franchise. However, this policy had clear limits: the executive, police, and judiciary continued to oppose the social democrats even without a special law. The attempt to modify the Prussian three-class franchise was rebuffed by the traditional elites, who forced the resignation of the interior minister Ernst Ludwig Herrfurth and his replacement with the conservative Botho zu Eulenburg.

==== Social policy and tax reform ====
The social question meant that a progressive social policy was a central aspect of the reforms. Initially, these reforms were fully supported by Wilhelm II, in line with his idea of a "social empire." Caprivi attempted to use socio-political measures to neutralise the "revolutionary threat" supposedly posed by social democracy. In addition to the initial express support of Wilhelm II, the reforms were especially pushed by the Prussian minister of trade, Hans Hermann von Berlepsch. The employment of children under the age of 13, who had not yet completed their compulsory schooling, in factories was forbidden and 13- to 18-year-olds restricted to a maximum 10-hour day. In 1891 Sunday working was forbidden and a guaranteed minimum wage introduced, and working hours for women were reduced to a maximum of 11. In addition, labour regulations were passed and industrial tribunals were established in 1890 to arbitrate in industrial disputes. Caprivi explicitly invited social-democratic representatives of trade unions to sit on these tribunals. An amendment of the Prussian mining law was proposed and support was offered for workers' housing. However, this policy had already come to a standstill in the later part of Caprivi's chancellorship.

The "Miquelsche tax reform", named for Johannes von Miquel, introduced a progressive income tax for the first time, which was supported by lower-income earners and also benefited landowners. In connection with the tax reform, new rural district regulations were passed, which extended suffrage to 200,000 people who had hitherto been excluded from political participation. The conservatives successfully watered down the reform so that only a minority of manors were affected.

=== Opposition to Caprivi ===
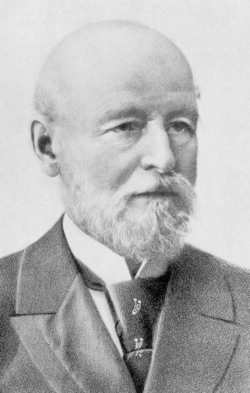
Botho zu Eulenburg played a substantial role in the collapse of Caprivi's chancellorship and was his successor as Minister-President of Prussia.

Due to his "Policy of Compromise" and especially his foreign and trade policies, opposition to Caprivi became widespread. It was particularly strong on the right, but eventually the army and Wilhelm II became opponents as well.

==== Right-wing opposition ====
An important role in the development of right-wing opposition was played by Otto von Bismarck, who took advantage of positive statements about Caprivi from his "support parties", in order to publicly campaign against the "leftist policy" of his successor. Bismarck's position was strengthened by Caprivi's clumsiness, when he blocked a planned meeting between Bismarck and Emperor Franz Joseph I of Austria-Hungary. Bismarck had been unpopular at the end of his chancellorship, but he now improved his reputation and became a centre of a right-wing opposition movement.

After the conclusion of the Zanzibar treaty with Britain, supporters of colonialism attacked Caprivi for selling off German interests. Even Bismarck, whose attitudes towards overseas expansion were lukewarm, participated in the attacks, with sharp criticism. An important opponent of the restrained colonial policy was the Alldeutscher Verband, a popular right-wing organisation. Meanwhile, Caprivi's trade policy led to strong opposition among conservative landowners. There were massive protests, in which large landowners were notable participants.

We must scream until it is heard at the steps of the throne!... I suggest nothing more or less than that we join with the social democrats and earnestly form a front against the government, show it that we are not minded to allow ourselves to be so badly treated, as we have been up till now, and make our strength known to them.

This proclamation in 1893 led to the establishment of the German Agrarian League.

On 20 December 1893, the conservative Kreuzzeitung spoke of an "unbridgeable chasm between the chancellor and the conservatives." In the German Conservative Party, criticism focussed especially on the rural district reforms, the commercial treaty with Austria in 1891, and the failure of a school reform based on religious confession. Hitherto, the party had been friendly to government, but it now become an oppositional force. At the Tivoliparteitag of 1892 it declared its support for Adolf Stoecker and his anti-semitic position.

==== Education bill and resignation in Prussia ====
Caprivi was also attacked by the National Liberals, Progressives, Free-minded liberals, and Free Conservatives whom he had tried to bring into his tent. The reason for this was an educational bill providing denominational board schools, a failed attempt to re-integrate the Catholic Centre Party into the conservative establishment after the Kulturkampf. Caprivi, although himself a Protestant, needed the 100 votes of the Catholic Centre Party but that alarmed the Protestant politicians. The publication of the draft law prompted an unexpectedly strong storm of indignation from civic liberals and moderate conservatives. Wilhelm II withdrew his support from the law. After the culture minister, Robert von Zedlitz-Trützschler resigned in 1892, Caprivi offered his own resignation as well. As a result, Caprivi lost his position as Prussian Minister President and was replaced by Count Botho zu Eulenburg, leading to an untenable division of powers between the Chancellor and the Prussian premier. Caprivi had lost the Emperor's trust, even as the conflict between Caprivi and Eulenburg increased the Emperor's ability to exercise personal authority.

==== Clash over the Military bill ====
Simultaneously, a conflict arose over a new military bill. This consisted of an increase in the strength of the Imperial German Army and a decrease in military service from three years to two. The shortening of military service provoked considerable criticism from traditional military men in the Emperor's circle. Wilhelm himself harshly criticised the reduction of military service, since his grandfather Wilhelm I had instituted the three-year military service through considerable personal effort with the support of Bismarck in the 1860s. Some modernisers welcomed the measures, because they raised the number of reservists, but overall Caprivi lost support in military circles. Wilhelm II initially opposed the bill, but eventually allowed himself to be persuaded by the chancellor. Caprivi was unable to get the bill through the Reichstag, so he had it dissolved and called an early election in 1893. The newly elected Reichstag approved a plan which accorded with Caprivi's intentions. The left-liberals splintered on the military question. Eugen Richter and his Free-minded People's Party rejected the plan completely, but the Free-minded Union sought a compromise with Caprivi. The Centre Party was initially prepared to support Caprivi, but withdrew from him after the failure of the school reforms and as the criticism of the military plan increased.

==== Fall ====
By 1893, Caprivi's position had been weakened by several factors. Caprivi clashed with Wilhelm increasingly during his term as Chancellor, offering his resignation nearly a dozen times in four years. The Kaiser privately called him "a sensitive old fathead". In the Reichstag, there was no stable majority. Prussia had become an independent centre of power. The anger of the Conservatives intensified, accompanied by constant public attacks by retired Bismarck.

The actual end of Caprivi's chancellorship was triggered by his approach to the social democrats. The emperor had moved away from his initial social policy, under the influence of Carl Ferdinand von Stumm-Halberg, and now supported a law against the "revolutionary parties." Accordingly, Eulenburg announced an Imperial law against "revolutionary tendencies." It was clear that the Reichstag would not agree to this law, so he proposed that the Reichstag be dissolved and new elections held. Since a new Reichstag was also likely to reject the law against "revolutionary tendencies," he also proposed to enact a new electoral law which would insure the desired majority. In addition, Eulenburg's plan was also intended to get rid of Caprivi, who would not support a law akin to the Anti-Socialist laws that he himself had abolished. Wilhelm II made his own support for a battle against the "parties of revolution" clear. Caprivi remained opposed and offered his resignation. At first Wilhelm attempted to prevent this and turned against Eulenberg. But Eulenburg managed to persuade Wilhelm II that Caprivi was responsible for the publication of important private conversations between the emperor and the chancellor. Thus, on 26 October 1894, Wilhelm II required both Caprivi and Eulenburg to resign. They were succeeded by Prince Chlodwig von Hohenlohe-Schillingsfürst.

Caprivi destroyed his papers on the evening of his resignation and departed for Montreux the next day. He made no public appearances for months and, throughout his retirement, he refused to speak or write publicly about his experiences as Chancellor or share his opinions on current events. He lived with his nephew at Skyren (today known as Skórzyn, Poland) and died there in 1899.

== Contemporary evaluations and historiography ==
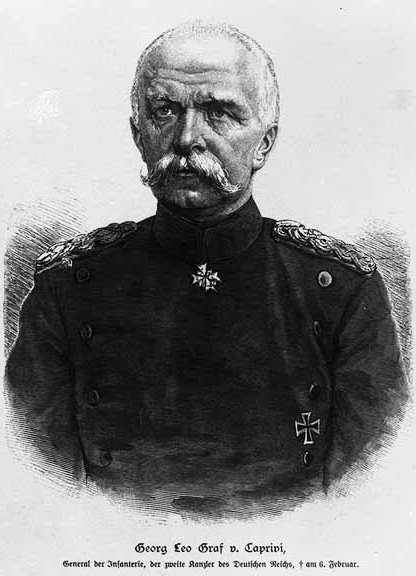
Leo von Caprivi

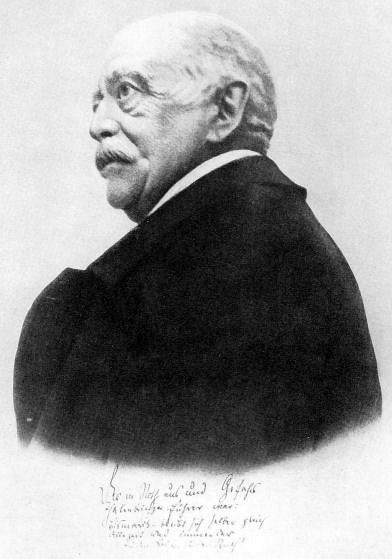
Otto von Bismarck significantly affected the image of Caprivi.

Caprivi's contemporaries differed in their evaluations of him. The social democrat historian Franz Mehring wrote a retrospective in Die Neue Zeit, in which he said that Caprivi had "the most earnest wish to eliminate the dirty corruption, which had pervaded the German sphere under Bismarck... so long as society remains the same, it will not deliver an Imperial Chancellor better than Caprivi was." Karl Bachem, the Centre Party's expert on history, also evaluated Caprivi positively. Unlike his successors, Caprivi had a positive reputation in Britain.

Otto von Bismarck had initially praised Caprivi, saying that he "has a clear head, a good heart, a magnanimous nature, and a great capacity for work. All in all, a man of the first rank." But the old chancellor soon became one of Caprivi's fiercest critics. His portrayal of Caprivi as a "political midget" had an enduring impact on his reputation. Additionally, Caprivi's rival characterised him mockingly as a "mixture of a junior officer and an audit committee."

Bismarck's judgement was closely linked to negative judgements on his decision not to extend the Reinsurance Treaty with Russia. This decision appeared to have been a catastrophic reversal of the principles of Bismarck's policy. For a long time, historians characterised Caprivi as a hard-working and honourable, but limited general, who was not capable of continuing Bismarck's genius. In the 1920s, General von Schweidnitz, who had been ambassador to Russia under Caprivi, made a statement which has been frequently cited as evidence of Caprivi's incompetence in foreign affairs:

Humble, honourable, and earnest, he explained to me that the greatest difficulty, which he now faced, was the question of the renewal of the Russian treaty, since, unlike Prince Bismarck, whom Wilhelm I famously compared to a juggler juggling five glass balls, he could only hold two glass balls at a time.

This image has been nuanced in recent years. Current scholarship no longer considers the decision not to extend the Reinsurance Treaty to have been a catastrophe and the treaty itself is seen as a stopgap rather than a stroke of diplomatic genius.

An alternative evaluation of Caprivi developed gradually. In 1957, Heinrich Otto Meisner characterised him as a capable orator but a poor persuader. In his view, he was not a political general and as a "chancellor in uniform" was a politician of limited ability, a conscientious character who sought to persuade and be persuaded, and managed only through great toil and study to match what came naturally to others. In the late 1950s, Golo Mann painted a picture of Caprivi that was almost diametrically opposed to the negative evaluations of the first half of the twentieth century, characterising him as single-minded, unbiased, and incorruptible: "among the series of German chancellors between 1890 and 1918, he was the best." According to Mann, Caprivi sought only to do what was right, but was politically inexperienced and naively expected to receive support from "good men," failing to realise that in politics few people are "good," nor can be good. Current research is more sober, but acknowledges that Caprivi had some important achievements. In 2006, Klaus Rüdiger Metze considered that Caprivi had understood that Germany was transforming from an agrarian economy to an industrial one and had helped this process through his social and trade policies. In Metze's view, Caprivi was capable of compromise and self-criticism, as well as tenacious pursuit of his goals. Metze attributes the failure of his policy of liberal-conservative reform to his inability to negotiate effectively with his internal political opponents.

Heinrich August Winkler concludes that Caprivi and his allies in the Imperial service were motivated by an honest desire for reform, but that Caprivi undermined these efforts as a result of "major mistakes" like the school reform law and the military plan. Thomas Nipperdey argued that Caprivi's New Course was a promising and optimistic attempt at a systematic and open re-orientation of Imperial politics and that it failed as a result of the particular party system at the time, the opposition of special interest groups, the tension between Prussia and the rest of the Empire, and the supercilious attitude of feudal agrarian conservativism and the semi-absolute military monarchy towards Caprivi's rational-bureaucratic brand of conservativism. Nipperdey also concludes that he failed to manage the Emperor's volatility and desire to participate directly in government. Hans-Ulrich Wehler judged that Caprivi's New Course represented a sharp break with Bismarck's policy, but that the problems he faced were not resolvable without firm political support.

== Honours ==
He received the following orders and decorations:

- Prussia:
  - Knight of the Crown Order, 3rd Class with Swords, 1866; 1st Class with Swords on Ring, 22 March 1884
  - War Commemorative Cross (1866)
  - Service Award Cross
  - Iron Cross (1870), 1st Class
  - Pour le Mérite (military), 18 January 1871
  - Knight of the Red Eagle, 2nd Class with Oak Leaves, 1879; with Star, 18 January 1884; Grand Cross with Crown, 12 June 1892
  - Commander's Cross of the Royal House Order of Hohenzollern, 12 January 1878; Grand Commander's Cross, 16 March 1894
  - Knight of the Black Eagle, 17 June 1890; with Collar, 17 January 1891; in Brilliants 29 October 1894
- Anhalt: Grand Cross of the Order of Albert the Bear, 1893
- (Austrian Empire) (Kingdom of Hungary) Austria-Hungary:
  - Knight of the Iron Crown, 2nd Class, 1872
  - Grand Cross of the Royal Hungarian Order of St. Stephen, 1890
- Baden: Knight of the House Order of Fidelity, 1890
- Bavaria:
  - Knight of St. Hubert
  - Grand Cross of the Military Merit Order
- Belgium: Grand Cordon of the Order of Leopold
- Brunswick: Grand Cross of the Order of Henry the Lion, with Swords, 1889
- China: Order of the Double Dragon, Class I Grade III
- (Saxe-Coburg and Gotha) (Duchy of Saxe-Altenburg) (Saxe-Meiningen) Ernestine duchies: Grand Cross of the Saxe-Ernestine House Order
- Hesse-Darmstadt: Grand Cross of the Ludwig Order, 7 October 1890
- Japan: Grand Cordon of the Rising Sun
- Italy: Knight of the Annunciation, 10 November 1890
- Mecklenburg: Grand Cross of the Wendish Crown
- Netherlands: Grand Cross of the Netherlands Lion
- Oldenburg: Grand Cross of the Order of Duke Peter Friedrich Ludwig, with Golden Crown and Swords on Ring
- Ottoman Empire:
  - Order of Osmanieh, 1st Class in Brilliants
  - Order of the Medjidie, 1st Class
- Reuss-Gera: Cross of Honour, 1st Class with Swords
- Romania: Grand Cross of the Star of Romania
- Russia:
  - Knight of St. Andrew, in Brilliants, 1894
  - Knight of St. Anna, 2nd Class with Swords
- Saxe-Weimar-Eisenach: Grand Cross of the White Falcon, 1891
- Saxony:
  - Commander of the Albert Order, 2nd Class, 1875
  - Knight of the Rue Crown
- Schaumburg-Lippe: Cross of Honour of the House Order of Schaumburg-Lippe, 1st Class
- Siam: Grand Cross of the White Elephant
- Württemberg:
  - Commander of the Friedrich Order, 1st Class, 1875
  - Grand Cross of the Württemberg Crown, 1890

== Writings ==
- Speeches: Rudolf Arndt (ed.): Die Reden des Grafen von Caprivi im Deutschen Reichstage, Preußischen Landtage und bei besonderen Anlässen. 1883-1893. Mit der Biographie und dem Bildnis. Ernst Hofmann & Co., Berlin 1894 (Digitalisat); Reprint (= Deutsches Reich – Reichskanzler Vol. II/I) Severus, Hamburg 2011, ISBN 978-3-86347-147-7.
- Letters: M. Schneidewin (ed.): Briefe: Deutsche Revue. Vol. 47/2, 1922.

== See also ==
- Caprivi cabinet (Prussia)

== Bibliography ==
- Massie, Robert (1991). Dreadnought. New York: Random House. p. 110.
- Meisner, Heinrich Otto (1957). "Caprivi, Leo von". Neue Deutsche Biographie (in German). Vol. 3. Berlin: Duncker & Humblot. pp. 134–135. (full text online).
- Metze, Klaus Rüdiger (2006). "Leo von Caprivi (1831–1899)". In Sternburg, Wilhelm von (ed.). Die deutschen Kanzler. Von Bismarck bis Merkel. Berlin: Aufbau-Taschenbuch-Verlag. pp. 39–54. ISBN 3-7466-8032-8.
- Nipperdey, Thomas (1992). Deutsche Geschichte 1866–1918. Machtstaat vor der Demokratie (in German). München: C. H. Beck. ISBN 3-406-34801-7.
- Spenkuch, Hartwin, ed. (2003a). Die Protokolle des Preußischen Staatsministeriums 1817–1934/38. 21. März 1890 bis 9. Oktober 1900 (PDF). Acta Borussica. Vol. 8. Hildesheim: Olms-Weidmann. ISBN 3-487-11005-9.
- Headlam, James Wycliffe (1911). "Caprivi de Caprera de Montecuccoli, Georg Leo von, Count" . In Chisholm, Hugh (ed.). Encyclopædia Britannica. Vol. 5 (11th ed.). Cambridge University Press. pp. 291–292.
- Wehler, Hans-Ulrich (1995). Deutsche Gesellschaftsgeschichte: Vol. 3: Von der deutschen Doppelrevolution bis zum Beginn des Ersten Weltkrieges. 1849–1914 (in German). München: Beck. ISBN 3-406-32490-8.
- Winkler, Heinrich August (2002). Der lange Weg nach Westen. Vol. 1, Deutsche Geschichte 1806–1933. Sonderausgabe. Bonn: Bundeszentrale für Politische Bildung. ISBN 3-89331-463-6.

Political offices
Preceded by Otto von Bismarck	Prime Minister of Prussia; 1890–1892	Succeeded by Botho zu Eulenburg
Preceded by Otto von Bismarck	Chancellor of Germany; 1890–1894	Succeeded by Prince Chlodwig zu Hohenlohe-Schillingsfürst
