= National Economic Council (Prussia) =

Body set up to manage the national economy in Prussia

The National Economic Council (German: Volkswirtschaftsrat) was a body set up to manage the national economy first by Bismarck in Prussia. A subsequent Council was also set up later during the Weimar Republic.

The Economic Council was formed by decree of 17 November 1880. It was modeled on the French Conseil supérieur du commerce et de l'industrie. However, Bismarck faced strong opposition from the Reichstag who refused funds to allow it to be established on 2 December 1881.
