= German Poor Laws =

The German Poor Laws are the laws concerning poor relief which existed in Germany and its predecessor states.

== Prussia ==
Prussia conducted a review of its poor law system between 1842 and 1843. It is often claimed that this legislation granted federal government substantive powers over poor relief. In fact, the national law simply mandated that local government set up poor law unions to provide an existence minimum to the poor, but otherwise left the regulation and provision of the poor laws to local officials.

== Abolition ==
The German Poor Laws were not formally abolished until the 1961 Federal Social Welfare Law.

== See also ==
- English Poor Laws
- Scottish Poor Laws
- Irish Poor Laws
