= Albert von Maybach =

German lawyer, politician, and railway manager

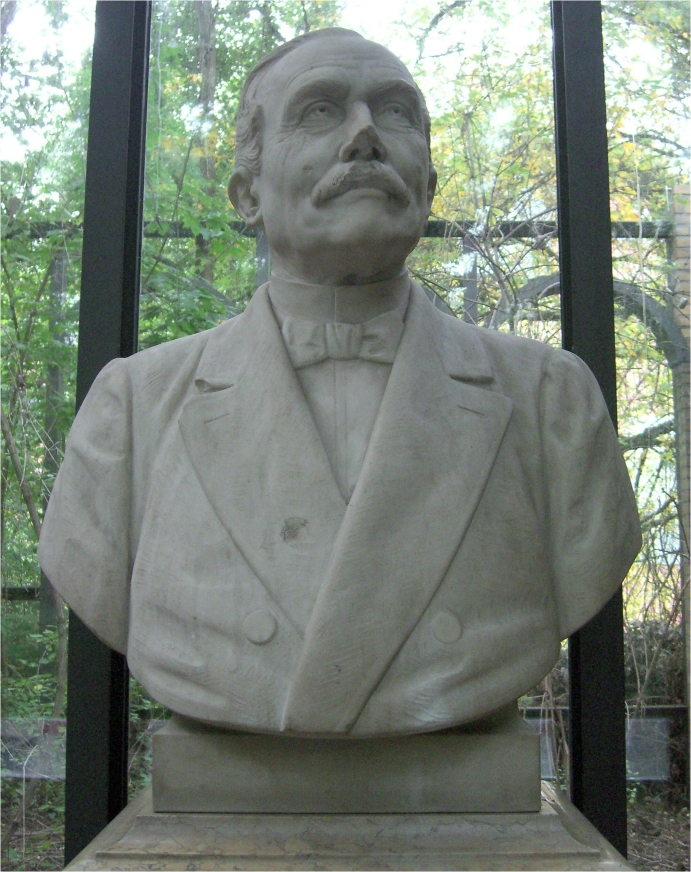
Bust of Albert von Maybach by Martin Goetze

Arnold Heinrich Albert von Maybach (29 November 1822 – 21 January 1904) was a German lawyer, politician and railway manager.

== Life ==
Albert von Maybach was born on 29 November 1822 at Werne an der Lippe as the son of the mayor (Bürgermeister) of Werne. Maybach went to the grammar school at Recklinghausen and studied law and politics at Bonn, Heidelberg and Berlin. In 1845 he entered the Prussia legal service. He became a junior barrister (Gerichtsassessor) in 1850 and a district judge in 1852 at Hagen.

In 1854 he switched careers and joined the headquarters of the Prussian state railways and from 1858 he was an official (a Vortragender Rat) in the Ministry of Trade. He was chairman of the board of the Upper Siliesian Railway (Oberschlesische Eisenbahn) at Breslau and, from 1863 to 1867, head of the Eastern Railway division at Bromberg. From 1 March 1867 to 9 January 1874 he ran the railway division in Hanover.

At the behest of Otto von Bismarck, in 1874 Maybach was appointed as head of the Imperial Railway Office (Reichseisenbahnamt). Bismarck's project to purchase the main railway lines for the German Empire failed, however, due to opposition from Germany's central states. Likewise, in 1875, the proposal by Maybach to the Bundesrat (the Federal Council of State Deputies) was also not taken up. Maybach gave up his post as president of the toothless Reich Railway Office in 1876 and was nominated as Under Secretary of State in the Prussian Ministry of Trade.

After the resignation of Heinrich von Achenbach, he took over as head of the Ministry on 30 March 1878 and made his top priority the nationalisations of the most important railway lines in northern Germany.

In 1879 the Ministry for Public Works was broken out of the Ministry of Trade. Maybach was appointed as Minister of Public Works and the management of the Prussian state railways was also transferred to him. With great skill he carried through an extensive programme of procuring private railways for the Prussian state and organised the management of its enormous railway network.

From 1882 to 1888 and again from 1890 to 1893 Maybach was a member of the Prussian House of Representatives. In 1888 he was elevated to the nobility.

In 1894 his daughter Helene married the noted cellist Robert Hausmann.

== Impact ==
Maybach achieved his greatest success as a minister in reforming the German railway system. He established the pan-German railway organisation and fought against the interests of private railway companies, which would have prevented the intensive expansion of railway lines across Germany. This battle led to the nationalisation of the most important railways in Germany.

Schools, roads, squares and mines have all been named after Maybach. The district of Maybach in the Saarland town of Friedrichsthal was also named after Albert von Maybach.

He died on 20 January 1904 in Charlottenburg.

== Honours ==
- Grand Commander's Cross of the Royal House Order of Hohenzollern, 22 March 1882 (Kingdom of Prussia)
- Grand Cross of the Order of the Württemberg Crown, 1883 (Kingdom of Württemberg)
- Knight of the Order of Berthold the First, 1884 (Grand Duchy of Baden)
- Grand Cross of the Order of the Red Eagle, with Oak Leaves, 10 January 1886 (Kingdom of Prussia)
- Grand Cross of the Grand Ducal Hessian Order of Ludwig, 24 May 1888 (Grand Duchy of Hesse)

== Sources ==
- Maybach, Albert. In: Meyers Konversationslexikon. 4. Auflage. Verlag des Bibliographischen Instituts, Leipzig und Wien 1888–1890, Bd. 11, S. 375.

== See also ==
- List of railway pioneers
