= Deputy Prime Minister of Prussia =

This page lists deputy prime ministers or minister-presidents of Prussia.

== Deputy prime ministers and minister-presidents of Prussia, 1873–1918 ==
- Otto von Camphausen 1873–1878
- Otto Graf zu Stolberg-Wernigerode 1878–1881
- Robert von Puttkamer 1881–1888
- Karl Heinrich von Boetticher 1888–1897
- Johannes von Miquel 1897–1901
- Theobald von Bethmann Hollweg 1907–1909
- Clemens von Delbrück 1914–1916
- Paul von Breitenbach 1916–1917
- Robert Friedberg 1917–1918

== See also ==
- Prime Minister of Prussia
