= List of trade ministers of Prussia =

Government official in Prussia

This is a list of trade ministers of Prussia.

== History ==
The trade ministers headed the Department of Factories, Commerce and Manufactories, and from 1848 the Ministry of Trade, Commerce and Public Works, later the Ministry of Trade and Commerce of Prussia.

== Finance Ministers ==
Name	Image	Term Start	Term End	Notes
Johann Andreas Kraut	Johann Andreas Kraut	1713	1723	
Samuel von Marschall		1740		
Erasmus Robert von Patow	Robert von Patow	1848	1848	Interim
Karl August Milde		1848	1848	
August von der Heydt	August von der Heydt	1848	1862	
Heinrich Wilhelm von Holtzbrinck		1862	1862	
Heinrich Friedrich August von Itzenplitz		1862	1873	Interim from October 8, 1862
Heinrich Karl Julius von Achenbach		1873	1878	
Albert von Maybach		1878	1879	
Karl von Hofmann		1879	1880	Interim from March 14, 1879
Otto von Bismarck	Otto von Bismarck	1880	1890	While serving as Prime Minister and Reich Chancellor
Hans Hermann von Berlepsch		1890	1896	
Ludwig Brefeld		1896	1901	
Theodor Adolf von Möller	Theodor von Möller	1901	1905	
Clemens von Delbrück		1905	1909	
Reinhold von Sydow		1909	1918	
Otto Fischbeck		1918	1921	
Wilhelm Siering		1921	1925	
Walther Carl Rudolf Schreiber		1925	1932	
Friedrich Ernst		1932	1933	
Alfred Hugenberg		1933	1933	
Kurt Schmitt		1933	1935	
Hjalmar Schacht	Hjalmar Schacht	1935	1937	
Hermann Göring	Hermann Göring	1937	1938	
Walther Funk	Walther Funk	1938	1938	
Franz Seldte		1935	1938	Labor Minister

== See also ==
- List of interior ministers of Prussia
- List of foreign ministers of Prussia
