= Johannes von Miquel =

Vice President of the Kingdom of Prussia (1897–1901)

Johannes von Miquèl
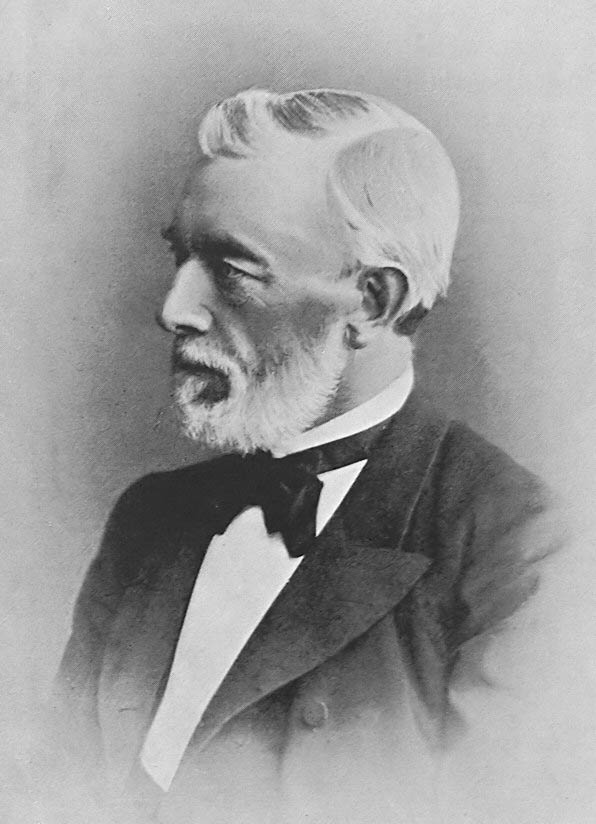

Deputy Minister-President of the Kingdom of Prussia
- In office 1 July 1897 – 5 May 1901
- Minister-President: Otto von Bismarck
- Preceded by: Karl Heinrich von Boetticher
- Succeeded by: Theobald von Bethmann Hollweg

Minister of Finance of the Kingdom of Prussia
- In office 24 June 1890 – 5 May 1901
- Minister-President: Otto von Bismarck
- Preceded by: Adolf von Scholz
- Succeeded by: Georg von Rheinbaben

Personal details
- Born: Johannes Franz Miquel; 19 February 1828 Neuenhaus, County of Bentheim, Kingdom of Hanover (now Germany)
- Died: 8 September 1901 (aged 73) Frankfurt am Main, Kingdom of Prussia, German Empire (now Germany)
- Resting place: Frankfurt Main Cemetery
- Party: National Liberal Party

Johannes von Miquel (19 February 1828 – 8 September 1901) was a German statesman.

== Biography ==
Born Johannes Franz Miquel (Note: His baptismal entry lists "Franciscus Joannes" as his first name (in Latin). His death certificate names him as "Johann Franz". Most commonly used is Johannes Franz Miquel.) at Neuenhaus, Kingdom of Hanover on 19 February 1828 as a descendant from a French family that had emigrated during the French Revolution, Miquel learnt law at the universities of Heidelberg and Göttingen. He studied the writings of Karl Marx and became a member of the illegal Communist League until 1852. Miquel was in close correspondence with Marx and active in the Revolutions of 1848–1849.

In 1850 he settled down to practise as an advocate at Göttingen and began to distance himself from the communist labour movement. He acquired a reputation as an able lawyer and rising politician, especially for his knowledge of financial questions. He was one of the founders of the German National Association, and in 1863 he was elected a member of the Hanoverian parliament as a Liberal and an opponent of the government. He accepted the annexation of Hanover by Prussia without regret, and was one of the Hanoverians whose parliamentary abilities at once won a commanding position in the Prussian parliament, which he entered in 1867.

For some reason, perhaps because Bismarck did not entirely trust him, he did not at this time attain quite so influential a position as might have been anticipated; nevertheless he was chairman of the parliamentary committee which in 1876 drafted the new rules of legal procedure, and he found scope for his great administrative abilities in the post of mayor of Osnabrück. He held this position from 1865 to 1870, and again from 1876 to 1879, having in the meantime moved to Berlin, where he was first a director of the Disconto-Gesellschaft (1870–1873), and then a member of its advisory board (1873–1876).

In 1879, he was elected Lord Mayor of Frankfurt am Main, where he gained a great reputation for the energy with which he dealt with social questions, especially that of the housing of the poor. This office also made him a member of the Prussian House of Lords. Probably owing to his early study of socialism, he was very ready to support the new social reforms of Bismarck. He was the chief agent in the reorganization of the National Liberal Party in 1887, in which year he entered the imperial Reichstag.

After Bismarck's fall in 1890, he was chosen Prussian minister of finance and held this post for about ten years (24 June 1890 – 5 May 1901). He distinguished himself by his reform of the Prussian system of taxation, the one really successful measure of the new reign in internal affairs. An attempt, however, to reform the system of imperial finance in 1893–1894 failed, and much injured his reputation. Miquel had entirely given up his Liberalism, and aimed at practical measures for improving the condition of the people irrespective of the party programmes; yet some of his measures, such as that for taxing Warenhäuser ("stores"), were of a very injudicious nature. He professed to aim at a union of parties on the basis of the satisfaction of material interests, a policy to which the name of Sammlung ("Collective") was given; but his enemies accused him of constantly intriguing against the three chancellors under whom he served, and of himself attempting to secure the chancellorship.

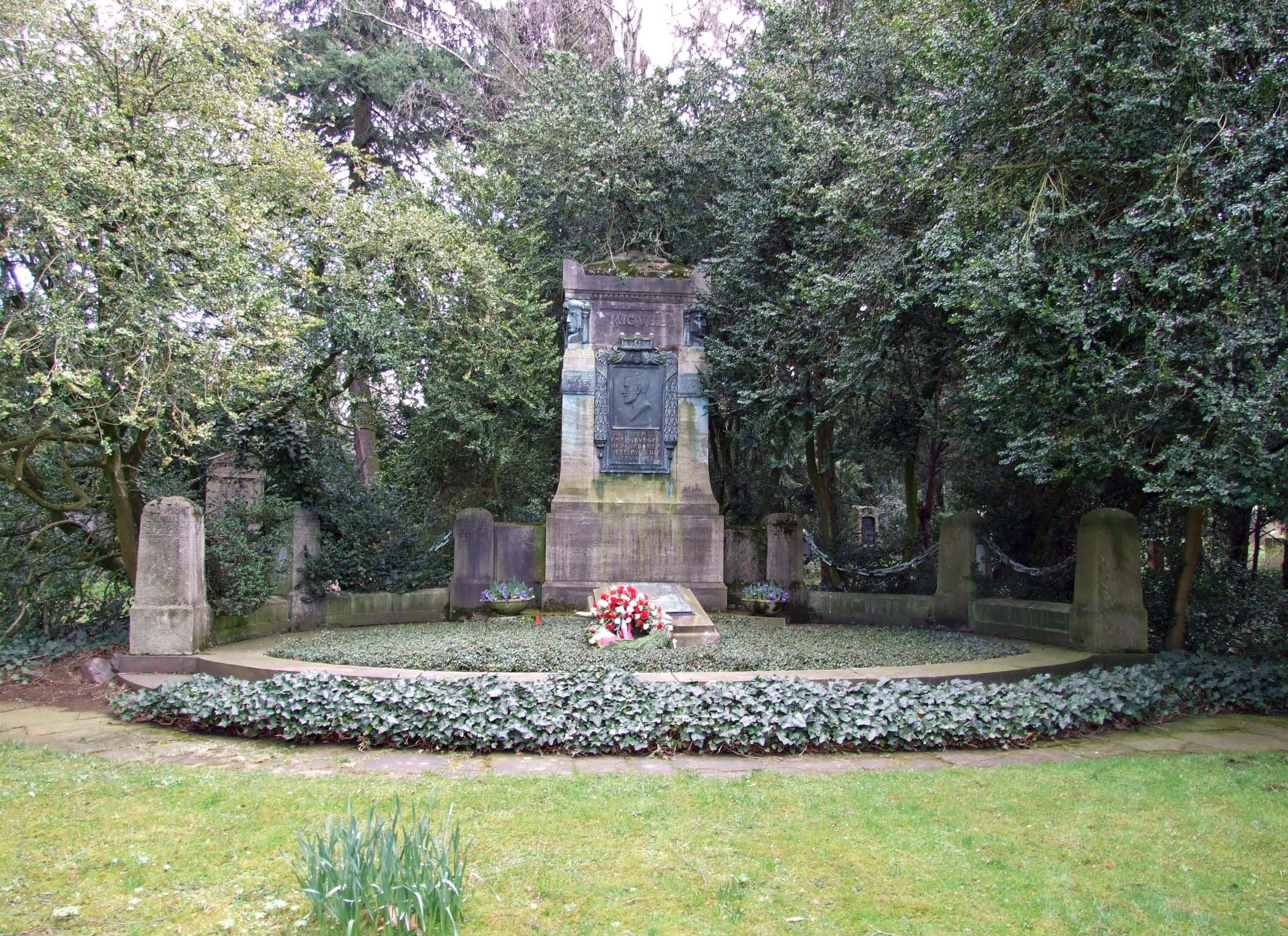
Grave at Frankfurt Main Cemetery

The sympathy that he expressed for the Agrarians increased his unpopularity among Liberals and industrials; but he pointed out that the state, which for half a century had done everything to help manufactures, might now attempt to support the failing industry of agriculture. By playing somewhat into the hands of the Agrarians, he secured the adoption of a new tax system, which greatly benefited the working classes and at the same time tremendously increased the revenue. In June 1901, the rejection of a canal bill led to a crisis, and he was obliged to send in his resignation. His health was already failing, and he died on 8 September of the same year at his house in Frankfurt.

The German Emperor conferred upon him the patent of nobility (enabling him to adopt the von in front of his last name) on 27 January 1897, and conferred upon him the Order of the Black Eagle.

== Orders and decorations ==
- Kingdom of Prussia:
  - Knight of the Order of the Red Eagle, 1st Class with Oak Leaves, 27 January 1891; Grand Cross with Swords on Ring and Crown
  - Knight of the Royal Order of the Crown, 2nd Class
  - Knight of the Order of Wilhelm
  - Knight of the Order of the Black Eagle, 27 January 1897; with Collar
- Duchy of Anhalt: Grand Cross of the House Order of Albert the Bear
- Baden: Knight of the Order of Berthold the First, 1895
- Kingdom of Bavaria: Grand Cross of the Order of Merit of the Bavarian Crown
- (Saxe-Coburg and Gotha) (Duchy of Saxe-Altenburg) (Saxe-Meiningen) Ernestine duchies: Grand Cross of the Saxe-Ernestine House Order
- Grand Duchy of Hesse: Grand Cross of the Grand Ducal Hessian Order of Ludwig
- Saxe-Weimar-Eisenach: Grand Cross of the Order of the White Falcon
- Württemberg: Grand Cross of the Order of the Württemberg Crown, 1896
- (Austrian Empire) (Kingdom of Hungary) Austria-Hungary: Grand Cross of the Royal Hungarian Order of Saint Stephen, 1900
- Kingdom of Italy: Grand Officer of the Order of Saints Maurice and Lazarus
- Luxembourg: Grand Cross of the Order of the Oak Crown
