= List of culture ministers of Prussia =

Government official in Prussia

The below is a list of Ministers of the Ministry of Spiritual, Educational and Medical Affairs of Prussia who was often, unofficially, referred to as the Minister of Culture.

== History ==
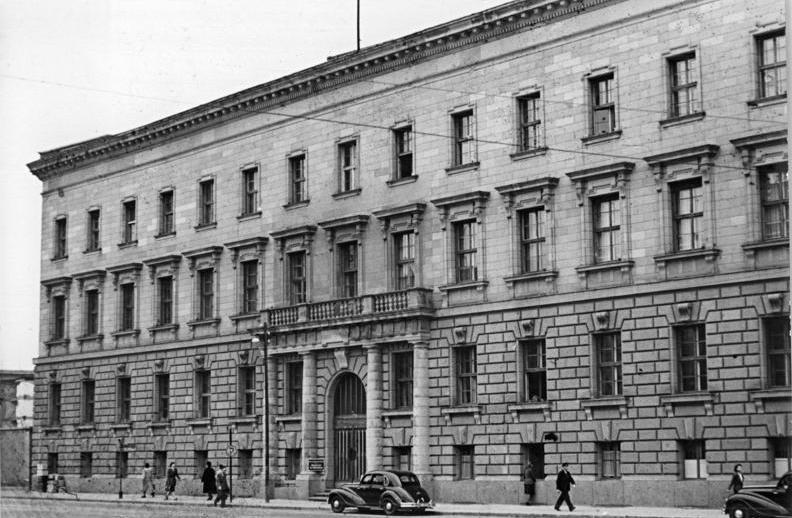
Extension building of the former Prussian Ministry of Culture in Berlin's Wilhelmstrasse, from 1934 the seat of the Reich Ministry of Education, from 1949 of the GDR Ministry of National Education, 1952

The Minister of Spiritual, Educational and Medical Affairs was a Prussian minister in the State Ministry. The ministry was created in 1817 from the former department "for culture and public education" that existed from December 1808 to November 1817 in the Ministry of Interior. The term Minister of Culture was not used in official addresses but existed under various names and responsibilities until 1945.

The first Minister was Karl vom Stein zum Altenstein who is known for reform of the Prussian educational system.

== Culture ministers ==
Name	Image	Term Start	Term End	Notes
Karl vom Stein zum Altenstein	Karl vom Stein zum Altenstein	1817	1838	
Adalbert von Ladenberg	Adalbert von Ladenberg	1840	1840	
Johann Albrecht Friedrich von Eichhorn	Johann Albrecht Friedrich von Eichhorn	1840	1848	
Maximilian von Schwerin-Putzar	Maximilian von Schwerin-Putzar	1848	1848	
Johann Karl Rodbertus	Johann Karl Rodbertus	1848	1848	
Adalbert von Ladenberg	Adalbert von Ladenberg	1848	1850	
Karl Otto von Raumer		1850	1858	
Moritz August von Bethmann-Hollweg	August von Trott zu Solz	1858	1862	
Heinrich von Mühler		1862	1872	
Adalbert Falk	Adalbert Falk	1872	1879	
Robert Viktor von Puttkamer	Robert Viktor von Puttkamer	1879	1881	
Gustav Konrad Heinrich von Goßler	Gustav von Gossler	1881	1891	
Robert von Zedlitz-Trützschler	Robert von Zedlitz-Trützschler	1891	1892	
Robert Bosse	Robert Bosse	1892	1899	
Konrad von Studt	Konrad von Studt	1899	1907	
Ludwig Holle	Ludwig Holle	1907	1909	
August von Trott zu Solz	Adam und August von Trott zu Solz	1909	1917	
Friedrich Schmidt-Ott	Friedrich Schmidt-Ott	1917	1918	
Adolph Hoffmann	Adolph Hoffmann	1918	1919	
Konrad Haenisch	Konrad Haenisch	1919	1921	
Carl Heinrich Becker	Carl Heinrich Becker	1921	1921	
Otto Boelitz	Otto Boelitz	1921	1925	
Carl Heinrich Becker	Carl Heinrich Becker	1925	1930	
Adolf Grimme		1930	1932	
Aloys Lammers		1932	1932	(as Reich Commissioner from Jul.–Oct. 1932)
Wilhelm Kähler	Wilhelm Kähler	1932	1933	(as state commissioner after the so-called "Preußenschlag")
Bernhard Rust	Bernhard Rust	1933	1945	(also Reich Minister of Education since 1934)

== See also ==
- Interior Ministers of Germany
