= Karl Heinrich von Boetticher =

German statesman (1833–1907)

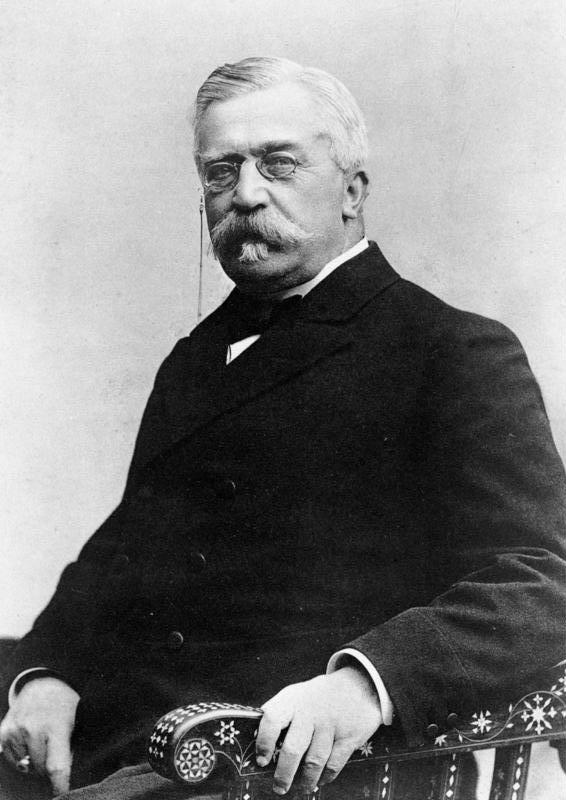
- Karl Heinrich von Boetticher in 1880

Vice-Chancellor of the German Empire
- In office 20 June 1881 – 1 July 1897
- Chancellor: Otto von Bismarck
- Preceded by: Otto Graf zu Stolberg-Wernigerode
- Succeeded by: Arthur von Posadowsky-Wehner

Secretary of the Interior of German Empire
- In office 1 September 1880 – 1 July 1897
- Chancellor: Otto von Bismarck (1871–1890); Leo von Caprivi (1890–1894); Chlodwig, Prince of Hohenlohe-Schillingsfürst (1894–1900)
- Preceded by: Karl Hofmann
- Succeeded by: Arthur von Posadowsky-Wehner

Member of the Reichstag
- In office 1878–1879
- Constituency: Schleswig-Holstein 2

Personal details
- Born: 6 January 1833 Stettin, Pomerania, Kingdom of Prussia
- Died: 6 March 1907 (aged 74) Naumburg, Province of Saxony, Prussia, German Empire
- Party: Free Conservative Party, German Conservative Party
- Education: University of Würzburg; University of Berlin
- Occupation: Lawyer

Karl Heinrich von Boetticher (6 January 1833 – 6 March 1907) was a German conservative statesman. He served as the secretary of the Interior (1880–1897), and the vice-chancellor of the German Empire (1881–1897).

== Biography ==
Born in Stettin in Pomerania, the son of a judge, Boetticher studied law in the University of Würzburg and the University of Berlin. He became the Regierungspräsident (regional president) of Schleswig in 1876. In 1878 he became a member of the Reichstag for the Free Conservative Party. Between 1879 and 1880, he was the Oberpräsident of the Province of Schleswig-Holstein. In 1880, he succeeded Karl von Hofmann as Minister of the Interior of the German Empire. In 1881, he also became vice chancellor in Bismarck's cabinet. He held both positions until 1897.

As the representative of Chancellor Bismarck, Boetticher introduced numerous social reforms, and the enactment of the invalid and old-age insurance laws in 1889 was due principally to his energy and executive ability.

== Honours ==
He received the following orders and decorations:

- Kingdom of Prussia:
  - Knight of the Black Eagle, with Collar
  - Grand Commander's Cross of the Royal House Order of Hohenzollern, with Star
  - Landwehr Service Medal, 1st Class
- Duchy of Anhalt: Grand Cross of the Order of Albert the Bear
- Austria-Hungary: Grand Cross of the Imperial Order of Leopold
- Baden: Knight of the Order of Berthold the First, 1884
- (Saxe-Coburg and Gotha) (Duchy of Saxe-Altenburg) (Saxe-Meiningen) Ernestine duchies: Grand Cross of the Saxe-Ernestine House Order
- Grand Duchy of Hesse:
  - Grand Cross of the Merit Order of Philip the Magnanimous, 28 March 1886
  - Grand Cross of the Ludwig Order, 31 May 1889
- Empire of Japan: Grand Cordon of the Rising Sun
- Mecklenburg: Grand Cross of the Wendish Crown, with Golden Crown
- Netherlands: Grand Cross of the Netherlands Lion
- Oldenburg: Grand Cross of the Order of Duke Peter Friedrich Ludwig

== Literature ==
Political offices
Preceded by Otto zu Stolberg-Wernigerode	Vice Chancellor of Germany; 1881–1897	Succeeded by Arthur von Posadowsky-Wehner
