= Bismarck-Roon cabinet =

Bismarck-Roon Cabinet
- Cabinet of the Kingdom of Prussia
- 1862–1890
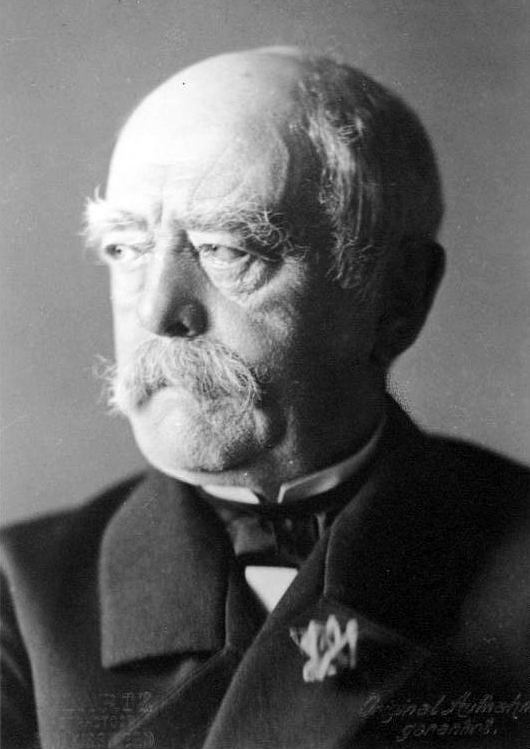
- Minister President Bismarck
- Date formed: September 23, 1862
- Date dissolved: March 30, 1890 (27 years, 6 months and 1 week)

People and organisations
- King: William I (1862–1888); Frederick III (1888); William II (1888–1890)
- Minister President: Otto von Bismarck; Albrecht von Roon

History
- Predecessor: Hohenlohe-Ingelfingen cabinet
- Successor: Caprivi cabinet

The Bismarck-Roon Cabinet formed the Prussian State Ministry appointed by King William I, and his successors Frederick III, and William II, from September 23, 1862, to March 30, 1890.

== History ==
After the previous government failed due to the Prussian constitutional conflict with the liberal majority in the chamber over the state parliament's participation in military affairs and fundamentally over the parliamentarization of Prussia, William I appointed a conflict minister, Otto von Bismarck. Bismarck successfully ended the constitutional conflict for the crown through the successes of his policies in the wars against Denmark in 1864 and Austria and its German allies in 1866, which enabled him to have the subsequent tax approval in the Indemnity Act (Indemnitätsgesetz) approved by the House of Representatives as a reconciliation offer to the Liberals. The right-wing part of the Liberals now split off from the Progress Party as the National Liberal Party and supported it from then on. During the cabinet's term in office, the German Empire was founded under Prussian hegemony in 1871, which, however, also meant that Prussia was incorporated into the empire as a federal state. Albrecht von Roon replaced Bismarck as Prussian Prime Minister in 1873 in order to relieve the German Chancellor. The separation proved to be unsuccessful so Bismarck returned to the Prime Minister's office at the end of 1873.

== Cabinet members ==
| Portfolio | Minister | Took office | Left office | Party |
|---|---|---|---|---|
| Minister President (Note: From July 14, 1867, Bismarck also served as Federal Chancellor before becoming Chancellor of Germany on May 4, 1871.) | Otto von Bismarck | October 8, 1862 | December 21, 1872 | |
| Minister President | Albrecht von Roon | January 1, 1873 | November 9, 1873 | |
| Minister President | Otto von Bismarck | November 9, 1873 | March 30, 1890 | |
| Deputy Prime Minister | Otto von Camphausen | November 9, 1873 | March 23, 1878 | |
| Deputy Prime Minister | Otto Graf zu Stolberg-Wernigerode | 1 June 1878 | 20 June 1881 | DRP |
| Deputy Prime Minister | Robert Viktor von Puttkamer | October 8, 1881 | June 8, 1888 | DKP |
| Deputy Prime Minister | Karl Heinrich von Boetticher | August 16, 1888 | March 30, 1890 | |
| Minister of Foreign Affairs | Albrecht von Bernstorff | September 23, 1862 | October 8, 1862 | |
| Minister of Foreign Affairs | Otto von Bismarck | October 8, 1862 | March 30, 1890 | |
| Minister of Finance | August von der Heydt | September 23, 1862 | September 30, 1862 | |
| Minister of Finance | Carl von Bodelschwingh | September 30, 1862 | June 2, 1866 | Conservative |
| Minister of Finance | August von der Heydt | June 2, 1866 | October 26, 1869 | |
| Minister of Finance | Otto von Camphausen | October 26, 1869 | March 23, 1878 | Liberals |
| Minister of Finance | Arthur Hobrecht | March 30, 1878 | July 5, 1879 | NLP |
| Minister of Finance | Carl Hermann Bitter | July 5, 1879 | June 28, 1882 | |
| Minister of Finance | Adolf von Scholz | June 28, 1882 | March 30, 1890 | DRP |
| Minister of Spiritual, Educational and Medical Affairs | Heinrich von Mühler | September 23, 1862 | January 17/22, 1872 | |
| Minister of Spiritual, Educational and Medical Affairs | Adalbert Falk | January 22, 1872 | July 13, 1879 | Old Liberals |
| Minister of Spiritual, Educational and Medical Affairs | Robert Viktor von Puttkamer | July 13, 1879 | June 17, 1881 | DKP |
| Minister of Spiritual, Educational and Medical Affairs | Gustav von Goßler | June 17, 1881 | March 30, 1890 | DKP |
| Minister of Justice | Leopold zur Lippe-Biesterfeld-Weißenfeld | September 23, 1862 | December 5, 1867 | Conservative |
| Minister of Justice | Adolph Leonhardt | December 5, 1867 | October 29, 1879 | |
| Minister of Justice | Heinrich von Friedberg | October 29, 1879 | January 16, 1889 | |
| Minister of Justice | Hermann von Schelling | January 31, 1889 | March 30, 1890 | |
| Minister of Trade, Commerce and Public Works (until April 17, 1878, then Trade and Commerce) | Heinrich Wilhelm von Holtzbrinck | September 30, 1862 | October 8, 1862 | KP |
| Minister of Trade, Commerce and Public Works (until April 17, 1878, then Trade and Commerce) | Heinrich Friedrich von Itzenplitz | October 8/December 8, 1862 | April 23/May 13, 1873 | Conservative |
| Minister of Trade, Commerce and Public Works (until April 17, 1878, then Trade and Commerce) | Heinrich von Achenbach | April 23/May 13, 1873 | March 30, 1878 | DRP |
| Minister of Trade, Commerce and Public Works (until April 17, 1878, then Trade and Commerce) | Albert von Maybach | March 30, 1878 | March 14/July 14, 1879 | |
| Minister of Trade, Commerce and Public Works (until April 17, 1878, then Trade and Commerce) | Karl von Hofmann | March 14/July 14, 1879 | August 23, 1880 | |
| Minister of Trade, Commerce and Public Works (until April 17, 1878, then Trade and Commerce) | Otto von Bismarck | September 13, 1880 | January 31, 1890 | |
| Minister of Trade, Commerce and Public Works (until April 17, 1878, then Trade and Commerce) | Hans Hermann von Berlepsch | January 31, 1890 | March 30, 1890 | |
| Minister of Public Works (from April 17, 1878) | Heinrich von Achenbach | April 17, 1878 | March 3, 1879 | DRP |
| Minister of Public Works (from April 17, 1878) | Albert von Maybach | July 14, 1879 | March 30, 1890 | |
| Minister of Interior Affairs | Gustav von Jagow | September 23, 1862 | December 8, 1862 | KP |
| Minister of Interior Affairs | Friedrich zu Eulenburg (Note: Friedrich zu Eulenburg was on leave as from October 25, 1877 and was represented by Agriculture Minister Karl Rudolf Friedenthal.) | December 8, 1862 | March 30, 1878 | |
| Minister of Interior Affairs | Botho zu Eulenburg | March 30, 1878 | February 25, 1881 | DKP |
| Minister of Interior Affairs | Robert Viktor von Puttkamer | June 17, 1881 | June 8, 1888 | DKP |
| Minister of Interior Affairs | Ernst Ludwig Herrfurth | July 2, 1888 | March 30, 1890 | |
| Minister of War | Albrecht von Roon | September 23, 1873 | January 1/November 9, 1873 | Conservative |
| Minister of War | Georg von Kameke | January 1/November 9, 1873 | March 3, 1883 | |
| Minister of War | Paul Bronsart von Schellendorff | March 3, 1883 | April 8, 1889 | |
| Minister of War | Julius von Verdy du Vernois | April 8, 1889 | March 30, 1890 | |
| Minister of Agriculture (until March 13, 1879, then Agriculture, Domains and Forestry) | Heinrich Friedrich von Itzenplitz | September 23, 1862 | December 8, 1862 | Conservative |
| Minister of Agriculture (until March 13, 1879, then Agriculture, Domains and Forestry) | Werner von Selchow | December 8, 1862 | January 13, 1873 | Conservative |
| Minister of Agriculture (until March 13, 1879, then Agriculture, Domains and Forestry) | Otto von Königsmarck | January 13, 1873 | December 8, 1873 | Conservative |
| Minister of Agriculture (until March 13, 1879, then Agriculture, Domains and Forestry) | Heinrich von Achenbach | December 8, 1873 | September 19, 1874 | DRP |
| Minister of Agriculture (until March 13, 1879, then Agriculture, Domains and Forestry) | Karl Rudolf Friedenthal | September 19, 1874 | July 13, 1879 | DRP |
| Minister of Agriculture (until March 13, 1879, then Agriculture, Domains and Forestry) | Robert Lucius von Ballhausen | July 13, 1879 | March 30, 1890 | DRP |
| Naval Minister (until December 31, 1871) | Albrecht von Roon | October 8, 1862 | March 30, 1890 | |

== See also ==
- Prussian State Ministry
