= Manteuffel cabinet =

Manteuffel Cabinet
- Cabinet of the Kingdom of Prussia
- 1850–1858
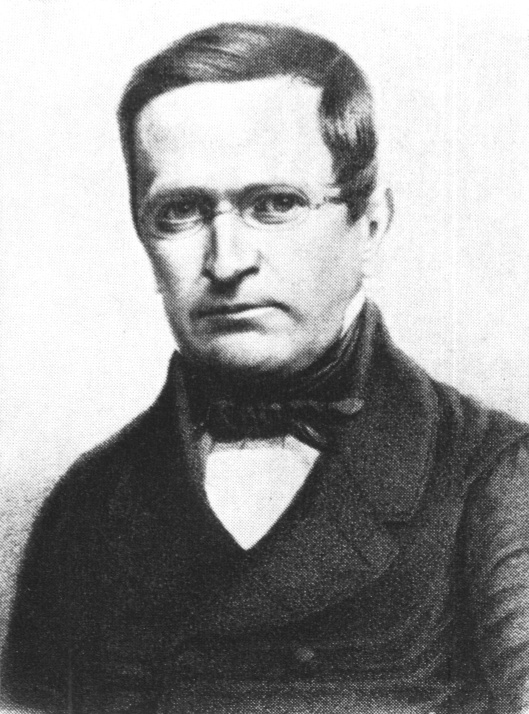
- Minister President Manteuffel
- Date formed: December 4, 1850
- Date dissolved: November 6, 1858 (7 years, 11 months and 2 days)

People and organisations
- King: Frederick William IV
- Minister President: Otto von Manteuffel

History
- Predecessor: Ladenberg cabinet
- Successor: Hohenzollern cabinet

The Manteuffel Cabinet formed the Prussian State Ministry appointed by King Frederick William IV from December 4, 1850, to November 6, 1858. The cabinet's term of office was characterized by the "New Era".

== Cabinet members ==
Portfolio	Minister	Took office	Left office	Party
Minister President	Otto Theodor von Manteuffel	December 19, 1850 (Note: Interim from December 4, 1850 until December 19, 1850.)	November 6, 1858	N/A
Minister of Foreign Affairs	Otto Theodor von Manteuffel	December 4, 1850	November 6, 1858	N/A
Minister of Finance	Rudolf von Rabe	December 4, 1850	July 23, 1851	N/A
Minister of Finance	Carl von Bodelschwingh	July 23, 1851	November 6, 1858	N/A
Minister of Spiritual, Educational and Medical Affairs	Adalbert von Ladenberg	December 4, 1850	December 19, 1850	N/A
Minister of Spiritual, Educational and Medical Affairs	Karl Otto von Raumer	December 19, 1850	November 6, 1858	N/A
Minister of Justice	Ludwig Simons	December 4, 1850	November 6, 1858	N/A
Minister of Trade, Commerce and Public Works	August von der Heydt	December 4, 1850	November 6, 1858	N/A
Minister of Interior Affairs	Otto Theodor von Manteuffel	December 4, 1850	December 19, 1850	N/A
Minister of Interior Affairs	Ferdinand von Westphalen	December 19, 1850	October 7, 1858	N/A
Minister of Interior Affairs	Eduard Flottwell	October 7, 1858	November 6, 1858	N/A
Minister of War	August von Stockhausen	December 4, 1850	December 31, 1851	N/A
Minister of War	Alexander von Wangenheim	December 31, 1851	January 13, 1852	N/A
Minister of War	Eduard von Bonin	January 13, 1852	May 5, 1854	N/A
Minister of War	Alexander von Wangenheim	May 5, 1854	August 3, 1854	N/A
Minister of War	Friedrich Graf von Waldersee	August 3, 1854	November 6, 1858	N/A
Minister of Agriculture, Domains and Forestry	Otto Theodor von Manteuffel (Note: Interim Agriculture Minister while serving as Interior Minister.)	December 4, 1850	December 19, 1850	N/A
Minister of Agriculture, Domains and Forestry	Ferdinand von Westphalen (Note: Interim Agriculture Minister while serving as Interior Minister.)	December 19, 1850	October 16, 1854	N/A
Minister of Agriculture, Domains and Forestry	Karl Otto von Manteuffel	October 16, 1854	Incumbent	N/A

== See also ==
- Prussian State Ministry
