= Hohenlohe-Ingelfingen cabinet =

Hohenlohe-Ingelfingen Cabinet
- Cabinet of the Kingdom of Prussia
- 1862–1862
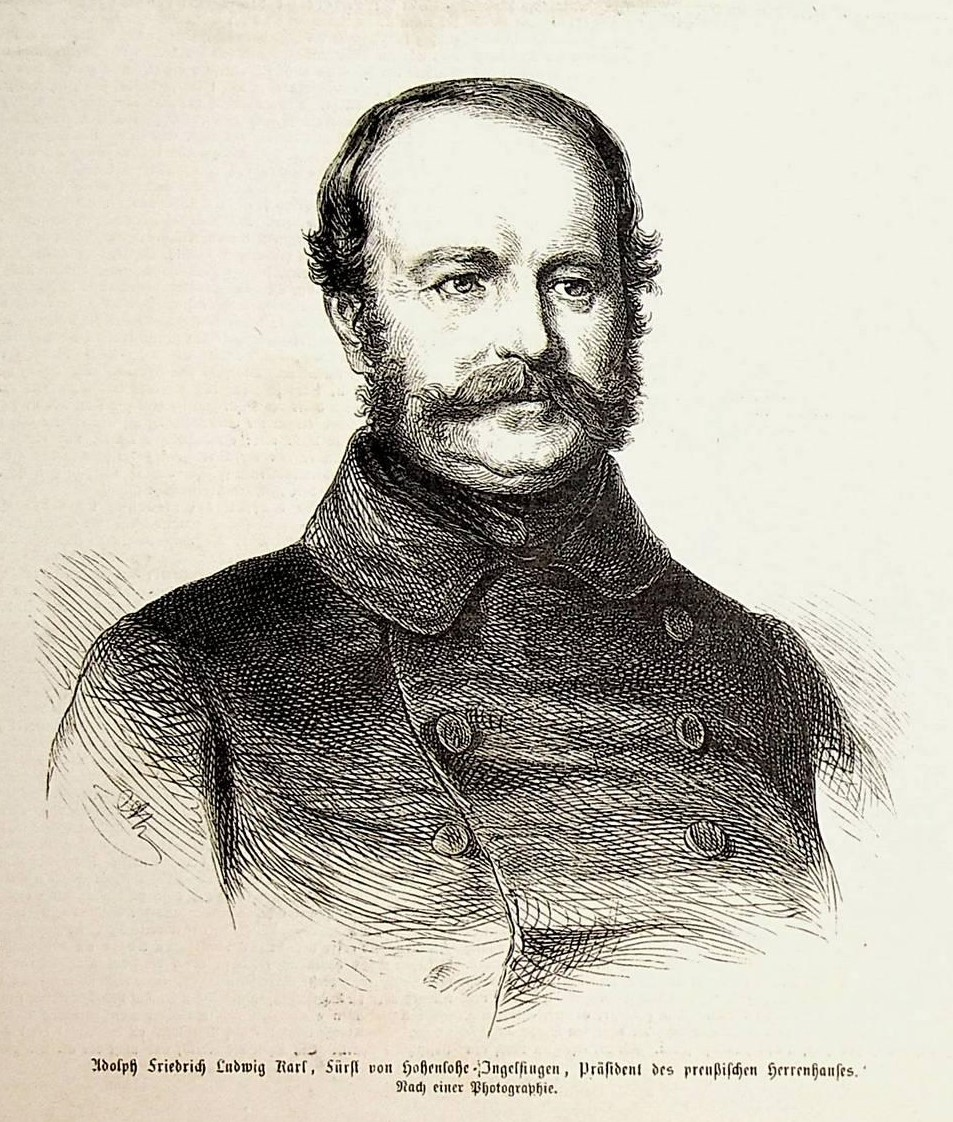
- Minister President Hohenlohe-Ingelfingen
- Date formed: March 11, 1862
- Date dissolved: September 23, 1862 (6 months, 1 week and 5 days)

People and organisations
- King: William I
- Minister President: Adolf von Hohenlohe-Ingelfingen

History
- Predecessor: Hohenzollern cabinet
- Successor: Bismarck-Roon cabinet

The Hohenlohe-Ingelfingen Cabinet formed the Prussian State Ministry appointed by King William I from March 11 to September 23, 1862.

== History ==
After the previous government failed due to the Prussian constitutional conflict with the liberal chamber majority over the state parliament's participation in military affairs and, in principle, the parliamentarization of Prussia, William I installed a more conservative government that tried to agree on a compromise solution with the parliamentary majority, which, however, did not succeed. One week after Hohenlohe-Ingelfingen took office, the cabinet was fundamentally reorganized. The leading head of the cabinet was not the Prime Minister, but Finance Minister August von der Heydt.

== Cabinet members ==
Portfolio	Minister	Took office	Left office	Party
Minister President	Adolf von Hohenlohe-Ingelfingen	March 11, 1862	September 23, 1862	N/A
Minister of State	Rudolf von Auerswald	March 11, 1862	March 17/18, 1862	N/A
Minister of Foreign Affairs	Albrecht von Bernstorff	March 11, 1862	September 23, 1862	N/A
Minister of Finance	Robert von Patow	March 11, 1862	March 17/18, 1862	N/A
Minister of Finance	August von der Heydt	March 17/18, 1862	September 23, 1862	N/A
Minister of Spiritual, Educational and Medical Affairs	Maximilian von Schwerin-Putzar	March 11, 1862	March 17/18, 1862	N/A
Minister of Spiritual, Educational and Medical Affairs	Heinrich von Mühler	March 17/18, 1862	September 23, 1862	N/A
Minister of Justice	August von Bernuth	March 11, 1862	March 17/18, 1862	N/A
Minister of Justice	Leopold zur Lippe-Biesterfeld-Weißenfeld	March 17/18, 1862	September 23, 1862	N/A
Minister of Trade, Commerce and Public Works	August von der Heydt	March 11, 1862	March 17/18, 1862	N/A
Minister of Trade, Commerce and Public Works	Heinrich Wilhelm von Holtzbrinck	March 17/18, 1862	September 23, 1862	N/A
Minister of Interior Affairs	Maximilian von Schwerin-Putzar	March 11, 1862	March 17/18, 1862	N/A
Minister of Interior Affairs	Gustav von Jagow	March 17/18, 1862	September 23, 1862	N/A
Minister of War	Albrecht von Roon	March 11, 1862	September 23, 1862	N/A
Minister of Agriculture, Domains and Forestry	Erdmann von Pückler	March 11, 1862	March 17/18, 1862	N/A
Minister of Agriculture, Domains and Forestry	Heinrich Friedrich von Itzenplitz	March 17/18, 1862	September 23, 1862	N/A
Naval Minister	Albrecht von Roon	March 11, 1862	September 23, 1862	N/A

== See also ==
- Prussian State Ministry
