= Hohenzollern cabinet =

Hohenzollern Cabinet
- Cabinet of the Kingdom of Prussia
- 1858–1862
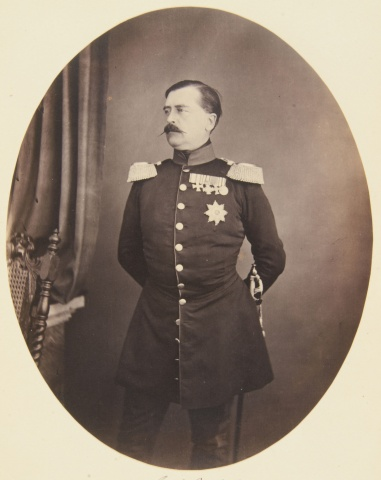
- Minister President Hohenzollern
- Date formed: November 6, 1858
- Date dissolved: March 11, 1862 (3 years, 4 months and 5 days)

People and organisations
- King: Frederick William IV; William I
- Minister President: Karl Anton von Hohenzollern

History
- Predecessor: Manteuffel cabinet
- Successor: Hohenlohe-Ingelfingen cabinet

The Hohenzollern Cabinet formed the Prussian State Ministry appointed by Prince Regent Wilhelm I from November 6, 1858, to March 11, 1862.

== History ==
The transfer of government duties to William I by the ill King Frederick William IV resulted in a change of political course. The newly installed government consisted of liberal-conservative representatives of the Wochenblatt Party. The term in office is referred to as the "New Era", in which, in a certain departure from the reactionary era, public life was liberalized and the government cooperated more closely with the liberal chamber majority. However, the de facto head of the cabinet was not the Prime Minister, but the liberal former Prime Minister of 1848, Rudolf von Auerswald. As a minister without a portfolio, he was de facto deputy to the Prime Minister. In the spring of 1862, the Army reform escalated the Prussian constitutional conflict with the liberal chamber majority over the state parliament's co-determination in military affairs and fundamentally over the (German: Parlamentarisierung, lit. 'parliamentarization') of Prussia, which led to the government's resignation and the end of the New Era.

== Cabinet members ==
Portfolio	Minister	Took office	Left office	Party
Minister President	Karl Anton von Hohenzollern	November 6, 1858	March 11, 1862	N/A
Minister of State	Rudolf von Auerswald	November 6, 1858	March 11, 1862	N/A
Minister of Foreign Affairs	Alexander von Schleinitz	November 6, 1858	October 10, 1861	N/A
Minister of Foreign Affairs	Albrecht von Bernstorff	October 10, 1861	March 11, 1862	N/A
Minister of Finance	Robert von Patow	November 6, 1858	March 11, 1862	N/A
Minister of Spiritual, Educational and Medical Affairs	Moritz August von Bethmann-Hollweg	November 6, 1858	March 11, 1862	N/A
Minister of Justice	Ludwig Simons	November 6, 1858	December 14, 1860	N/A
Minister of Justice	August von Bernuth	December 17, 1860	March 11, 1862	N/A
Minister of Trade, Commerce and Public Works	August von der Heydt	November 6, 1858	March 11, 1862	N/A
Minister of Interior Affairs	Eduard Flottwell	November 6, 1858	July 3, 1859	N/A
Minister of Interior Affairs	Maximilian von Schwerin-Putzar	July 3, 1859	March 11, 1862	N/A
Minister of War	Eduard von Bonin	November 6, 1858	November 27, 1859	N/A
Minister of War	Karl Anton von Hohenzollern	November 27, 1859	December 5, 1859	N/A
Minister of War	Albrecht von Roon	December 5, 1859	March 11, 1862	N/A
Minister of Agriculture, Domains and Forestry	Erdmann von Pückler	November 6, 1858	March 11, 1862	N/A
Chief of the Admiralty/Chief of Naval Administration /Naval Minister (from April 16, 1861)	Karl Anton von Hohenzollern	November 15, 1858	April 6, 1859	N/A
Chief of the Admiralty/Chief of Naval Administration /Naval Minister (from April 16, 1861)	Jan Schröder	April 6, 1859	December 6, 1860	N/A
Chief of the Admiralty/Chief of Naval Administration /Naval Minister (from April 16, 1861)	Albrecht von Roon	December 6, 1860	March 5, 1862	N/A

== See also ==
- Prussian State Ministry
