= State Council of Prussia (1817–1918) =

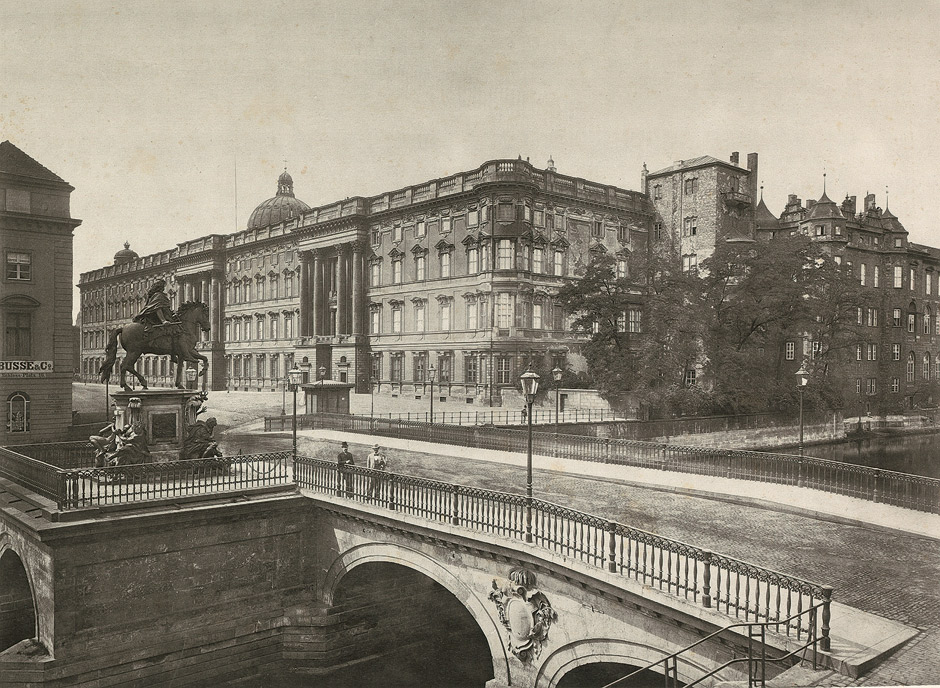
View of the Berlin Palace from the Long Bridge (1874). The State Council rooms were behind the windows that can be seen under the horse.

The Prussian State Council (German: Preußischer Staatsrat) was an advisory body to the monarch in the Kingdom of Prussia from 1817 to 1848 and reactivated in 1854, 1884, and 1895. Its members did not have the title of State Councilor, but were allowed to call themselves a Member of the State Council.

== History ==
After Prussia's defeat by Napoleon in the Battle of Jena–Auerstedt in 1806, the Prussian Reform Movement began with many areas based on the changes in France. A much-noticed innovation was the founding of the Conseil d'État by Napoleon in 1798. In the Rhine Confederation states, state councils were partly set up as advisory bodies based on this model, including the Constitution of the Kingdom of Westphalia. There were also Privy Councils in many territories in the Holy Roman Empire. In Prussia this was the Privy Council until 1808.

Heinrich Friedrich Karl vom und zum Stein proposed the establishment of a State Council with an advisory and legislative function in the Nassau Memorandum (German: Nassauer Denkschrift) and his draft ordinance of 24 November 1808 (which never came into effect). The ordinance of 27 October 1810 by Karl August von Hardenberg "on the amended constitution of all the highest state authorities in the Prussian monarchy" contains the establishment of a State Council as well as regulations regarding its composition, however, the committee was initially not actually introduced. The King's announcement in the Supreme Cabinet Order of 3 June 1814 "for the appointment of the Minister" that he wanted to put the Council of State into action after his return from Paris, but brings his order into connection with the question of the corporate constitution and representation, likely explains the delay in introduction until 1817.

=== 1817 introduction ===
Upon the introduction of the State Council of 20 March 1817, the State Council was formed and consisted of:

- The Prince of the Royal House (once they reach the age of eighteen);
- Certain officeholders:
  - State Chancellor and President of the State Council;
  - Field marshals;
  - Real Ministers of State in charge of the administration;
  - Minister-State Secretary, who keeps the minutes and reports of the State Council and is responsible for the formalities of business transactions;
  - Postmaster General;
  - Head of the Higher Tribunal;
  - First President of the Chamber of Accounts;
  - Privy Cabinet Councilor;
  - Officer who has the authority to present military matters to the King;
  - Commanding generals in the provinces (but only if they are specially appointed);
  - Supreme presidents in the provinces (but only if they are specially appointed);
- Public servants who, through the King's special trust, receive a seat and vote in the state council and are appointed by it.

The State Council formed seven committees (called departments) each consisting of five members:

- Foreign Affairs
- War
- Justice
- Finance
- Trade and Commerce
- Interior and the Police
- Culture and Public Education

== Responsibilities ==
The State Council was tasked with advising on legislative proposals including regulations, decrees, etc., but had no right of initiative, only dealing with proposals that were assigned to it. The State Council had no decision-making authority, but voted for, or against, proposals and could make suggestions for changes. The monarch usually followed this vote. If the monarch attended the meetings of the Council of State, he left the meeting when voting so as not to influence the result.

The proportion of laws submitted to the State Council decreased rapidly. In 1818, all 16 of 16 suitable laws were discussed, in 1821, 10 out of 31 and, in 1826, there were 4 out of 30.

=== March Revolution and Reaction Era ===
As a result of the German revolutions of 1848–1849, Prussia changed from an absolute to a constitutional monarchy in 1848. Legislation now rested exclusively with the King and Parliament. The Prussian Constitution, which came into force in 1850, did not provide for a State Council. The Secretariat of the State Council was dissolved; State Secretary Bode had already been placed on hold on 1 October 1848.

In the Reaction Era, King Frederick William IV reactivated the State Council in 1854 as a personal body to assess the most important state affairs. When the State Council was re-established, its role in the legislative process changed. Because laws were now only dealt with in the Landtag of Prussia, the matter was dealt with by the State Council prior to deliberation in Parliament.

New members were appointed (former members remained members) and the State Council was invited to deliberate. Some of the members of the State Council formed the "Central Assembly". On July 4, 1854, the full assembly of the State Council met in the Berlin Palace and the King inaugurated the members into office. From 1854 onwards, he only called meetings of the Central Assembly; for the other members, membership in the State Council was purely an honor. The King only referred a few matters to the Council of State for consideration. In October 1856, he had the Central Assembly meet for the last time, after which it went dormant.

=== Reactivation by Bismarck ===
At the instigation of Otto von Bismarck, the State Council was reactivated again in 1884. King Wilhelm I appointed 70 new members on 11 June 1884. Undersecretary Theodor von Möller was appointed State Secretary of the State Council. The basis of the work of the State Council was the regulation concerning the negotiations of the State Council. The regulations adapted the departments of the State Council to the structure of the ministries. Above all, the State Council was subordinate to the State Ministry. The ceremonial reopening took place on 25 October 1884 in the Berlin Palace. The Ministries provided little support for the work of the State Council and once again submitted only a few submissions to it. The State Council last met under Bismarck in 1890.

=== 1895 reactivation ===
After Hans von Kanitz introduced a bill in the Reichstag to monopolize grain imports and introduce minimum prices for grain, Kaiser Wilhelm II announced at the meeting of the State Ministry on 4 January 1895 that he would convene the State Council to discuss the bill. This led to intensive discussions. Bismarck's participation was a constitutional problem because a legal question existed whether his membership expired when he left office or whether he was a member for life due to his appointment in 1854. The political question was Kaiser Wilhelm II's policy of reconciliation towards Bismarck. The then Imperial Chancellor and Prime Minister Chlodwig zu Hohenlohe-Schillingsfürst visited Bismarck at Kaiser Wilhelm II's request and declared that he would become Vice President of the State Council if he appeared (Wilhelm II himself wanted to chair the meetings). Nevertheless, Bismarck decided not to attend the meeting and Hohenlohe became vice president. The second question was how to secure a majority for the government position. The government considered a peer boost and presented lists of names to Kaiser Wilhelm II. Instead, a "Central Assembly" of the State Council was called. The 16 members of the State Council selected in this way, advised by 26 large agrarians and financial magnates, met from March 12 to 21 under the chairmanship of the Emperor.

This was the last meeting of the State Council. It was never convened again, new members were no longer appointed, but the State Council was not abolished either. With the German Revolution of 1918–1919, its existence de jure ended. At that point, it only consisted of 8 members, apart from the members by office. The law on the provisional order of state power in Prussia of 20 March 1919 no longer provided for the State Council. The constitution of the Free State of Prussia of 30 November 1920 again provided for a State Council. However, this was not in the tradition of the old State Council, but was the representation of the Prussian provinces and was more oriented towards the Reichsrat.

== Presidents of the State Council ==
- Karl August von Hardenberg (1817–1822)
- Duke Charles of Mecklenburg (1825–1837)
- Karl Freiherr von Müffling (1837–1847)
- Friedrich Carl von Savigny (1847–1848)
- Otto Theodor von Manteuffel (1852–1856)
