= Bergkamen =

- Town
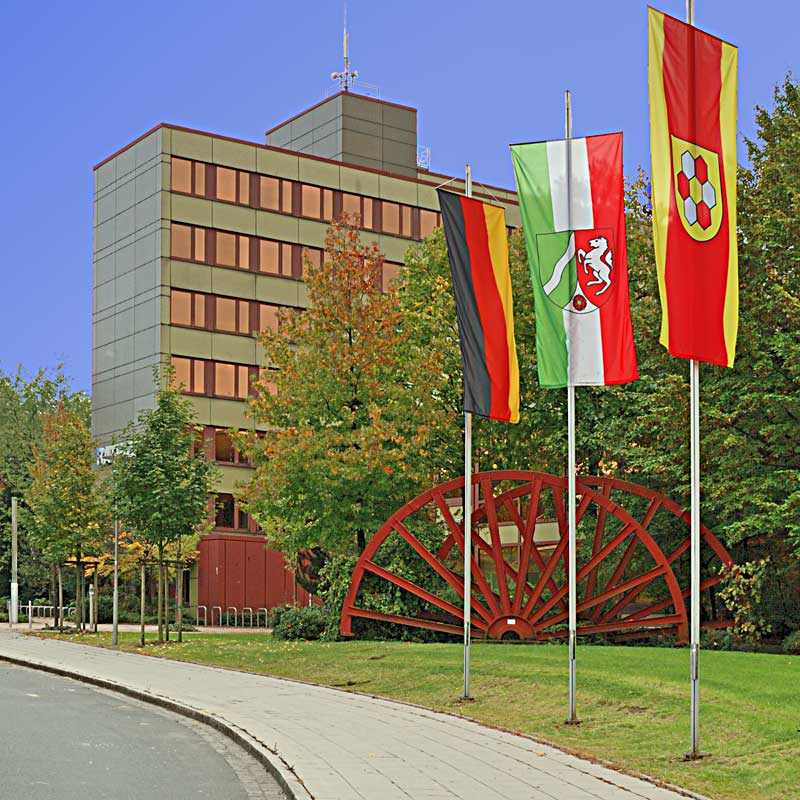
- Bergkamen city hall

- Coat of arms

- Location of Bergkamen within Unna district
- Interactive map of Bergkamen
- Location within Germany Location within North Rhine-Westphalia
- Coordinates: 51°37′N 7°38′E
- Country: Germany
- State: North Rhine-Westphalia
- Admin. region: Arnsberg
- District: Unna

Government
  - Mayor (2025–30): Thomas Heinzel (CDU)

Area
  - Total: 44.9 km^{2} (17.3 sq mi)
- Elevation: 68 m (223 ft)

Population (2025-12-31)
  - Total: 49,198
  - Density: 1,100/km^{2} (2,840/sq mi)
- Time zone: UTC+01:00 (CET)
  - Summer (DST): UTC+02:00 (CEST)
- Postal codes: 59192
- Dialling codes: 02307, 02389, 02306
- Vehicle registration: UN
- Website: www.bergkamen.de

Bergkamen (German pronunciation: [bɛʁkˈkaːmən]; Westphalian: Biärgkoamen) is a town in the district of Unna, in North Rhine-Westphalia, Germany. It is situated south of the river Lippe, approx. 15 km (9 mi) north-east of Dortmund and 15 km (9 mi) south-west of Hamm.

Bergkamen, a fairly new town in the east part of the Ruhr Area and south of the Münsterland, was founded in 1966 by the merging of at first five smaller communities. The town's history, however, reaches back to ancient Roman times - this can be experienced by visiting the Bergkamen Municipal Museum, which has a large Roman department, and the nearby archeological site, the “Roemerlager“.

== Main sights ==
- Westphalian Sports Boat Centre - Marina Ruenthe
- The neighbouring national trust area, “Beversee“, and the wooded hill, “Grosses Holz“, a renaturalized former slag heap, provide an inviting atmosphere for relaxation.

== Cultural events ==
- Harbour Festival ("Hafenfest") in June
- Light Festival ("Lichtermarkt") in October.

Bergkamen is home to theatre performances at the “studio theater bergkamen“ and numerous exhibitions in the town's own art gallery “sohle1“ or the “Stadtmuseum“

== History ==
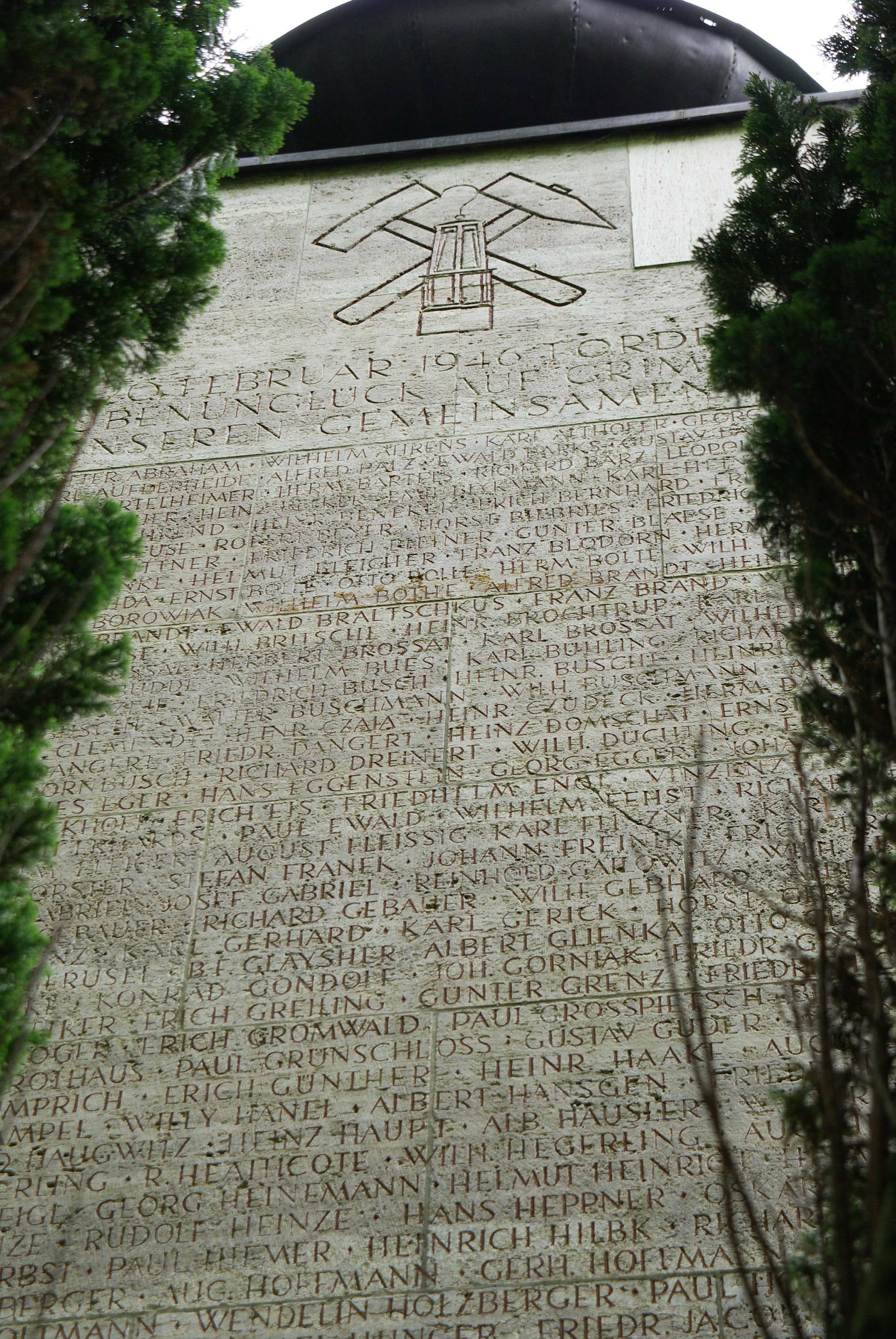
Memorial to the victims of the mining disaster on Grimberg 1946

In February 1946, a coal mine in the city suffered a dust explosion that killed 418 miners. This was the worst mining accident in German history.

== Population ==
Historical population

Year	Pop.	±% p.a.
1965	43,535	—
1970	44,304	+0.35%
1975	46,663	+1.04%
1980	47,986	+0.56%
1985	47,736	−0.10%
1990	49,761	+0.83%
1995	51,838	+0.82%

Year	Pop.	±% p.a.
2000	52,905	+0.41%
2005	52,225	−0.26%
2010	50,587	−0.64%
2015	47,803	−1.13%
2020	48,919	+0.46%
2025	49,198	+0.11%

Source: Landesdatabank Nordrhein-Westfalen

== Politics ==
The current mayor of Bergkamen is Thomas Heinzel of the CDU, who has been serving as mayor since 2025. In the 2025 local election he was elected with 53,4 % of the vote in the runoff election against former mayor Bernd Schäfer of the SPD.

=== City council ===
After the 2025 local elections, the Bergkamen city council is composed as follows:

Party	Votes	%	+/-	Seats	+/-
Social Democratic Party (SPD)	6,556	34.3	▼8.6	19	▼2
Christian Democratic Union (CDU)	5,221	27.3	▼0.6	15	▲1
Alternative for Germany (AfD)	4,194	21.9	New	12	New
Alliance 90/The Greens (Grüne)	1,208	6.3	▼10.6	4	▼4
The Left (Linke)	1,033	5.4	▲2.3	3	▲1
Uphill (BergAUF)	584	3.1	▼2.8	2	▼1
Free Democratic Party (FDP)	346	1.8	▼1.8	1	▼1
Valid votes	19,142	98.4			
Invalid votes	310	1.6			
Total	19,452	100.0		56	▲6
Electorate/voter turnout	37,647	51.7			
Source: City of Bergkamen

== Twin towns – sister cities ==
Bergkamen is twinned with:

- Hettstedt, Germany (1990)
- Silifke, Turkey (1994)
- Gennevilliers, France (1995)
- Wieliczka, Poland (1995)

== Notable people ==
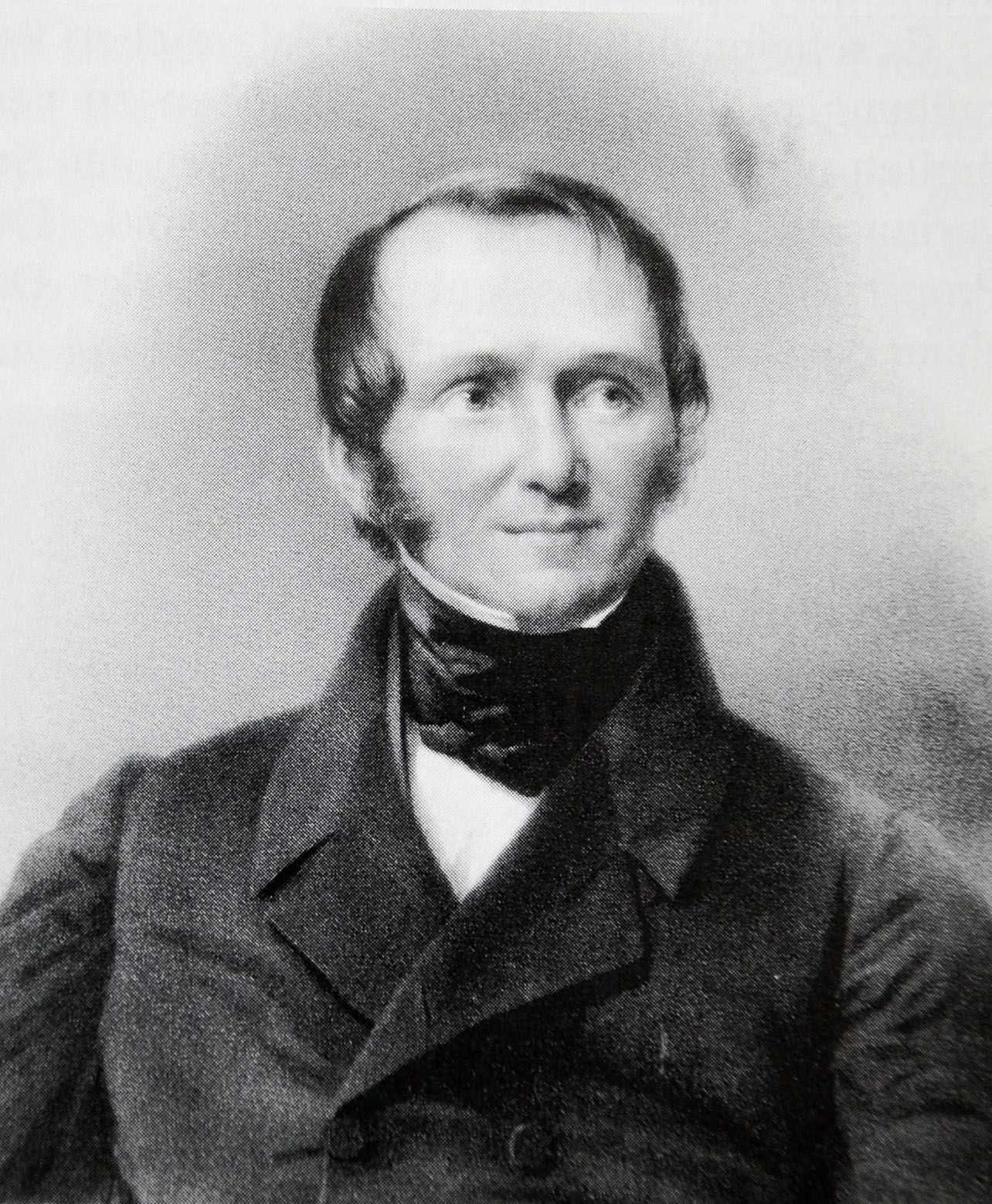
Ernst von Bodelschwingh

- Ernst von Bodelschwingh-Velmede (1794–1854), Prussian Minister of Interior and Cabinet
- Carl von Bodelschwingh (1800–1873), Prussian Finance Minister
- Ernst von Bodelschwingh (1906–1993), politician (Member of Bundestag, CDU)
- Josef Ledwohn (1907–2003), anti-Nazi resistance activist
- Hans Sennholz (1922–2007), economist
- Dietrich Schwanitz (1940–2004), best-selling author, grew up in Rünthe
- Eugen Drewermann (born 1940), theologian, church critic, best-seller author
- Peer Steinbrück (born 1947), politician (SPD), Member of Landtag, for Bergkamen 2000–2005
- Konrad Ott (born 1959), philosopher and ethicist
- Heiko Antoniewicz (born 1965), cook
- Frauke Petry (born 1975), politician (independent, former AfD), lived in Bergkamen and went to school there

== See also ==
- TuRa Bergkamen
