= Prussian State Council =

Upper house of Prussian Parliament of Prussia from 1920 to 1933

Prussian State Council Preußischer Staatsrat
- Coat of arms of Prussia

Type
- Type: Upper Chamber

History
- Established: 30 November 1920
- Disbanded: 8 July 1933
- Preceded by: Prussian House of Lords
- Succeeded by: Prussian State Council (Nazi Germany)

Leadership
- President: Konrad Adenauer, Centre Party
- Robert Ley, Nazi Party

Meeting place
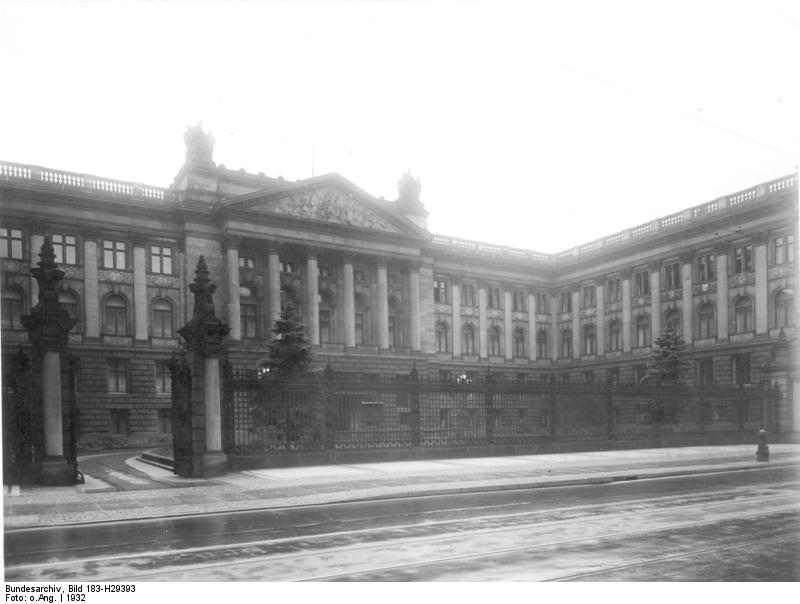
- Leipziger Straße, Berlin

Constitution
- Constitution of Prussia (1920)

The Prussian State Council (German: Preußischer Staatsrat) was the second chamber of the bicameral legislature of the Free State of Prussia between 1921 and 1933; the first chamber was the Prussian Landtag (Preußischer Landtag). The members of the State Council were elected by the provincial parliaments and gave the provinces of Prussia a voice in the legislative process. The Council had an indirect right to introduce legislation, could object to bills passed by the Reichstag and had to approve expenditures that exceeded the budget.

== Historical background ==
Until 1848 the State Council in the Kingdom of Prussia was an important institution within the Prussian executive, but its importance dwindled with the development of constitutionalism. The Council produced expert opinions and made recommendations. Decision-making power, however, rested solely with the king and cabinet.

With the push towards a constitution and the associated demand for separation of powers, the continued existence of the State Council came into question. The Prussian constitution of 1850 therefore did not provide for one. A revival was attempted with the decree of 12 January 1852 that re-established the Council, but it found no proper place for itself in a state with a constitution. A second attempt to revive it in 1884, along with the transfer of the chairmanship to Crown Prince Frederick William, led to no significant results. The Council ultimately faded away.

== Free State of Prussia in the Weimar Republic ==
=== Constitutional form ===
The Prussian Constitution of 1920, implemented after the German Revolution of 1918–1919 and the fall of the Hohenzollern monarchy, established a State Council in Section IV, Article 31 as a body for the participation of the provinces in the legislative process. It provided the Free State with a federal element, although Prussia otherwise remained a unitary state whose provinces were not constituent states.

| Province | Votes (1921) |
|---|---|
| Rhine Province | 14 |
| Westphalia | 9 |
| Berlin | 8 |
| Hanover | 6 |
| Lower Silesia | 6 |
| Saxony | 6 |
| Brandenburg | 5 |
| Hesse-Nassau | 5 |
| East Prussia | 4 |
| Pomerania | 4 |
| Upper Silesia | 4 |
| Posen-West Prussia | 3 |
| Schleswig-Holstein | 3 |
| Hohenzollern Lands | 1 |

The State Council was composed of members delegated by the provincial parliaments. Any male citizen over the age of 25 could be elected. The number of representatives from a province depended on its population; each province generally sent at least 3 representatives (with the exception of the Hohenzollern Lands, which had only one). Otherwise, each province had one vote for every 500,000 inhabitants; a remainder of at least 250,000 inhabitants above that gave an additional vote.

Like the Reichsrat – the body that represented the states' interests in the national parliament – the State Council had a right only to object to actions taken in the Prussian Landtag, and its objections could be overridden by a two-thirds majority in the Landtag. All state expenditures that exceeded the budget required the approval of the State Council. It also had an indirect right of initiative: proposals went to the State Ministry (the Prussian minister president and his cabinet) and had to be passed on by it to the Landtag. The State Council had the right to express its opinion on all matters concerning the Landtag and thus on legislation. It also had a right to obtain information from the State Ministry.

The State Council was convened by its president at the request of all the representatives of a province, of one-fifth of all members, or of the State Ministry. Konrad Adenauer of the Centre Party, then mayor of Cologne and after World War II the first chancellor of West Germany, held the chairmanship of the State Council from its inception until the Nazi takeover in 1933.

=== Provincial representatives ===
About one month after the provincial parliamentary elections, the elections for the members of the Prussian State Council were held by the provincial parliaments.

The results by election date and party were as follows:

| Date | AG^{1} | SPD | Centre | USPD | DDP | KPD | DHP | WP | Nazi Party | Total members |
|---|---|---|---|---|---|---|---|---|---|---|
| 21 Feb 1921 | 26 | 20 | 20 | 6 | 3 | 3 | 1 | | | 79 |
| 16 Oct 1921 | 26 | 21 | 20 | 5 | 3 | 3 | 1 | | | 79 |
| 19 Nov 1922 | 26 | 20 | 19 | 5 | 3 | 3 | 1 | | | 77 |
| 29 Nov 1925 | 32 | 24 | 17 | | 2 | 5 | | 1 | | 81 |
| 17 Nov 1929 | 28 | 22 | 19 | | 3 | 6 | | 3 | | 81 |
| 12 Mar 1933 | 6 | 8 | 12 | | | | | | 54 | 80 |

^{1} AG: Preußische Arbeitsgemeinschaft (Prussian Working Group): DNVP, DVP and other middle-class and conservative parties

=== Conflict between the State Council and the State Ministry ===
Konrad Adenauer, the president of the State Council, had significant reservations about the state government and its ministers. He thought that under Minister President Otto Braun of the Social Democrats (SPD), it was not treating the State Council with the importance that it deserved under the constitution. Braun and the rest of the government viewed the situation differently. He feared encroachment on his policy-making authority as minister president, and the other ministers, including those from Adenauer's Centre Party, were apprehensive of a possible dilution of democratic reforms by the conservative provinces east of the Elbe River. A rivalry thus developed between the two politicians and their respective state bodies which led the State Council to take a blockading stance towards the Landtag and its actions until the early 1930s. Adenauer took his case to the State Court for the German Reich in 1922. The court reached a settlement in 1923 after Adenauer had withdrawn a large part of his demands.

== Political end in 1932 and Nazi transformation ==
The Prussian state elections of 24 April 1932, which gave the Nazi Party the most seats but not enough to form a viable coalition with any other parties, also largely deprived the State Council of its ability to function. Legislative and budgetary decisions could no longer be implemented. In the Prussian coup d'état of 20 July 1932, the national conservative Reich government of President Paul von Hindenburg and Chancellor Franz von Papen issued an emergency decree to put executive power in Prussia into von Papen's hands as Reichskommissar. The decree left Braun's cabinet in place as an all but meaningless caretaker government and the State Council with little room to act. In a move towards dissolving the Landtag, Reich President Hindenburg by emergency decree unlawfully stripped Braun of his remaining powers on 6 February 1933 and replaced him with von Papen. Adenauer remained in office. A meeting of the three-man body that was necessary to dissolve the Landtag took place shortly afterwards. It consisted of the president of the Landtag Hanns Kerrl of the Nazi Party, Prussian minister president von Papen and Adenauer as president of the Council of State. Adenauer left the room before the vote, probably convinced that he had made it legally impossible to pass a resolution. Papen and Kerrl interpreted Adenauer's action as an abstention and decided to dissolve the Landtag. The legality of the procedure was highly questionable.

In the Prussian election on 5 March 1933, held in parallel with the national Reichstag election, the Nazi Party achieved the necessary majority to pass a Prussian enabling act which gave the Reich chancellor full authority over the state. The State Council was thereby definitively deprived of its co-legislative and co-executive functions. Following the elections to the provincial parliaments held the same month, the Nazis secured a majority of seats in the State Council. On 26 April the body elected Robert Ley, the Party's Reich organization leader, to succeed Adenauer. The Prussian "Law on the State Council" of 8 July 1933 dissolved the State Council in its previous form.

Simultaneously with the dissolution of the old State Council, a new institution of the same name was created. The State Council of Nazi Germany then consisted of those who were members by virtue of their office (the Prussian ministers and certain other holders of public office) and those awarded the title of state councilor (Staatsrat) by Prussian minister president Hermann Göring.

== Meeting place ==
The Prussian State Council met between 1921 and 1933 in the Herrenhaus on Leipziger Straße in Berlin. After World War II, the building housed part of the East German Academy of Sciences. Since 2000, the building, renovated and again with an assembly chamber, has served as the seat of the German Bundesrat.

== See also ==
- List of presidents of the State Council of Prussia
- Constitution of the Free State of Prussia – via Wikisource.
