= Duke Charles =

Duke Charles may refer to:

- Charles IX of Sweden
- Charles XIII of Sweden
- Charles, Duke of Burgundy
- Duke Charles of Mecklenburg
- Duke Charles Louis Frederick of Mecklenburg
