= List of presidents of the State Council of Prussia =

This is a list of presidents of the Prussian State Council from 1817 to 1933 in the Landtag of the Kingdom of Prussia and the Free State of Prussia.

== Presidents of the Prussian State Council (Kingdom of Prussia) ==
The presidents of the royal Prussian State Council were the heads of the government.

Name	Period
State Chancellor Karl August von Hardenberg	1817–1822
Otto von Voß (acting)	1822–1823
Karl zu Mecklenburg	1827–1837
Karl von Müffling	1837–1844
Gustav von Rochow	1844–1847
Friedrich Carl von Savigny	1847–1848
Otto Theodor von Manteuffel	1852–1856

== Presidents of the Prussian State Council (Free State of Prussia) ==
The presidents of the republican Prussian State Council were the head of the second chamber of the state parliament, staffed by representatives of the provinces of Prussia. On 18 May 1933 the state council ceded its participation in legislation to the Nazi Reich's government by voting for the Prussian empowerment Act. On 8 July 1933 the new Law on the State Council abolished it as an elected body and converted into a council of Nazi party favorites chosen by Göring's state government.

Name	Period	Party
Konrad Adenauer	1921–1933	Zentrum
Robert Ley	1933	NSDAP

== See also ==
- State Chancellor of Prussia
