= TuRa Bergkamen =

German football team

- Full name: Turn- und Rasensport Bergkamen e.V.
- Founded: 1945
- League: Kreisliga A (IX)
- 2015–16: Bezirksliga Westfalen Staffel 8 (VIII), 15th (relegated)

TuRa Bergkamen is a German association football club from the city of Bergkamen, North Rhine-Westphalia.

== History ==
The club was established in July 1945, out of the union of the former memberships of Turn- und Sport Bergkamen, Turnverein Bergkamen, and Arbeiter Turnverein Bergkamen, a group of onetime workers' clubs banned in 1933 under the Nazi regime as politically unpalatable left-leaning sides. The football department of the club later became independent as Fußball-Club TuRa Bergkamen.

Between 1948 and 1962 the footballers were part of the Amateurliga Westfalen (II) capturing a divisional title there in 1954. Following the 1963 formation of the Bundesliga, the new national first division, and the Regionalliga (II), Bergkamen became part of lower division play. In 1965, they won their way back to what had become the third tier Amateurliga Westfalen, where they would spend three seasons, before being sent down after a 15th-place result in 1968.

The current day club has departments for athletics, gymnastics, handball, judo, swimming, table tennis, and tennis. The footballers were part of Bezirksliga Staffel 8 (VIII) competition, after promotion from the Kreisliga A Unna-Hamm (IX) in 2012, but relegated again in 2016.
