= State Chancellor of Prussia =

The State Chancellor of Prussia was the highest minister of the Kingdom of Prussia and existed from 1807 to 1850. The State Chancellor was the forerunner to the Prime Minister of Prussia.

== History ==
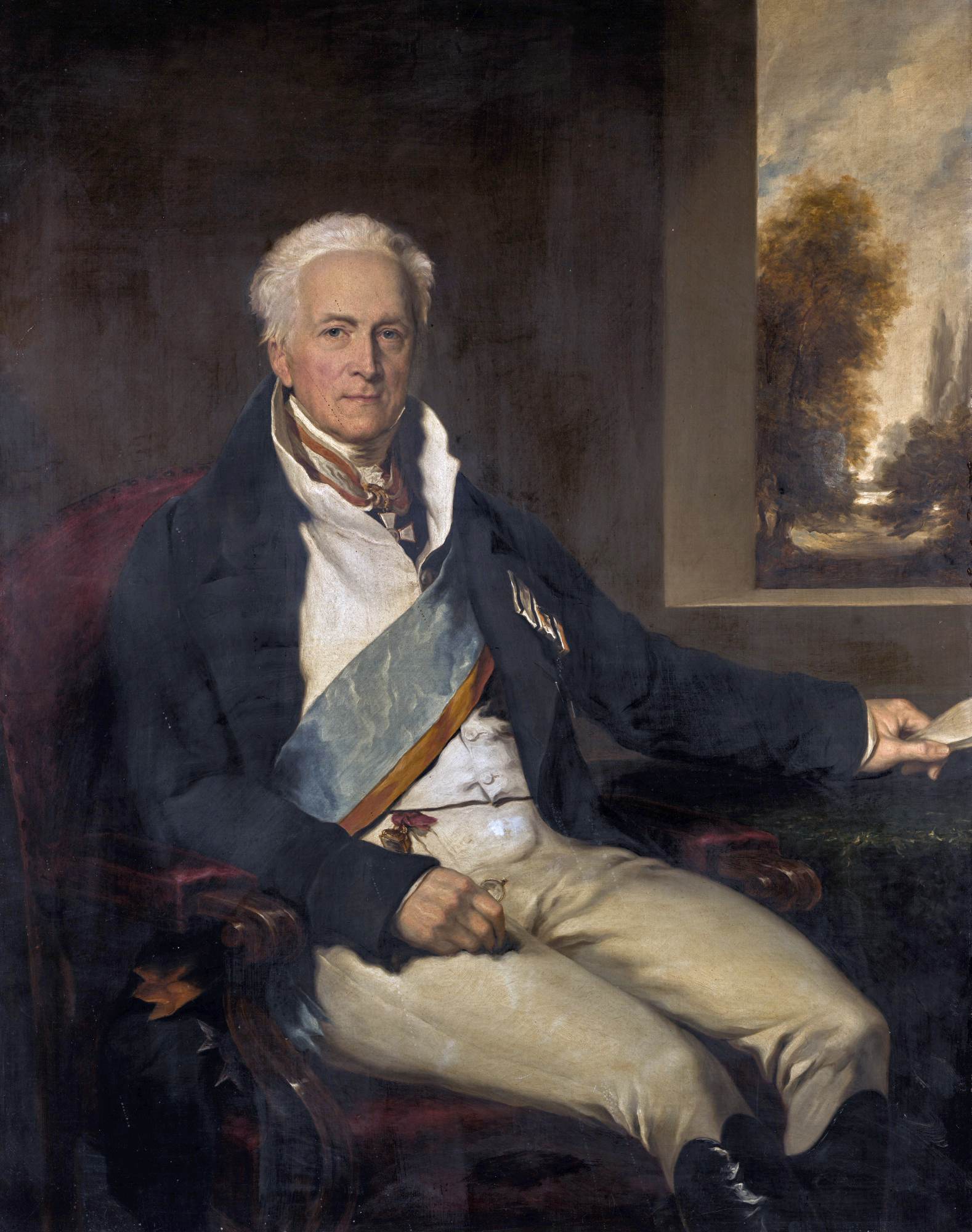
Portrait of Prince Karl August von Hardenberg, after Thomas Lawrence

The State Chancellor was primarily a subordinate executive body and overseer of the State Administration. He usually also chaired the Prussian State Council, especially when the King himself did not do so. The Chancellor's official residence was in the Berlin Palace.

The introduction of the office was related to Napoleon's occupation of Prussia as a curtailment of the power of the absolutist throne. While in office, the state reformer Prince Karl August von Hardenberg was able to have a significant influence on the Prussian reforms. After Hardenberg's death, the office of State Chancellor remained vacant until King Frederick William III when it was headed the Prussian State Ministry itself, with the cabinet minister giving the presentation enjoying formal priority. Carl Friedrich Heinrich, Graf von Wylich und Lottum became the cabinet minister in 1822.

=== Replacement ===
In 1822, the Prussian State Council had its own president instead of the Chancellor as chairman. However, he could only advise the King and had no direct executive powers, as he was not an official member of the State Ministry. The office officially existed until 1850, when the new Prussian constitution introduced the office of a Prussian Prime Minister even though the role had been rendered obsolete in March 1848.

== See also ==
- Prussian State Ministry
