= Konrad Ott =

German philosopher (born 1959)

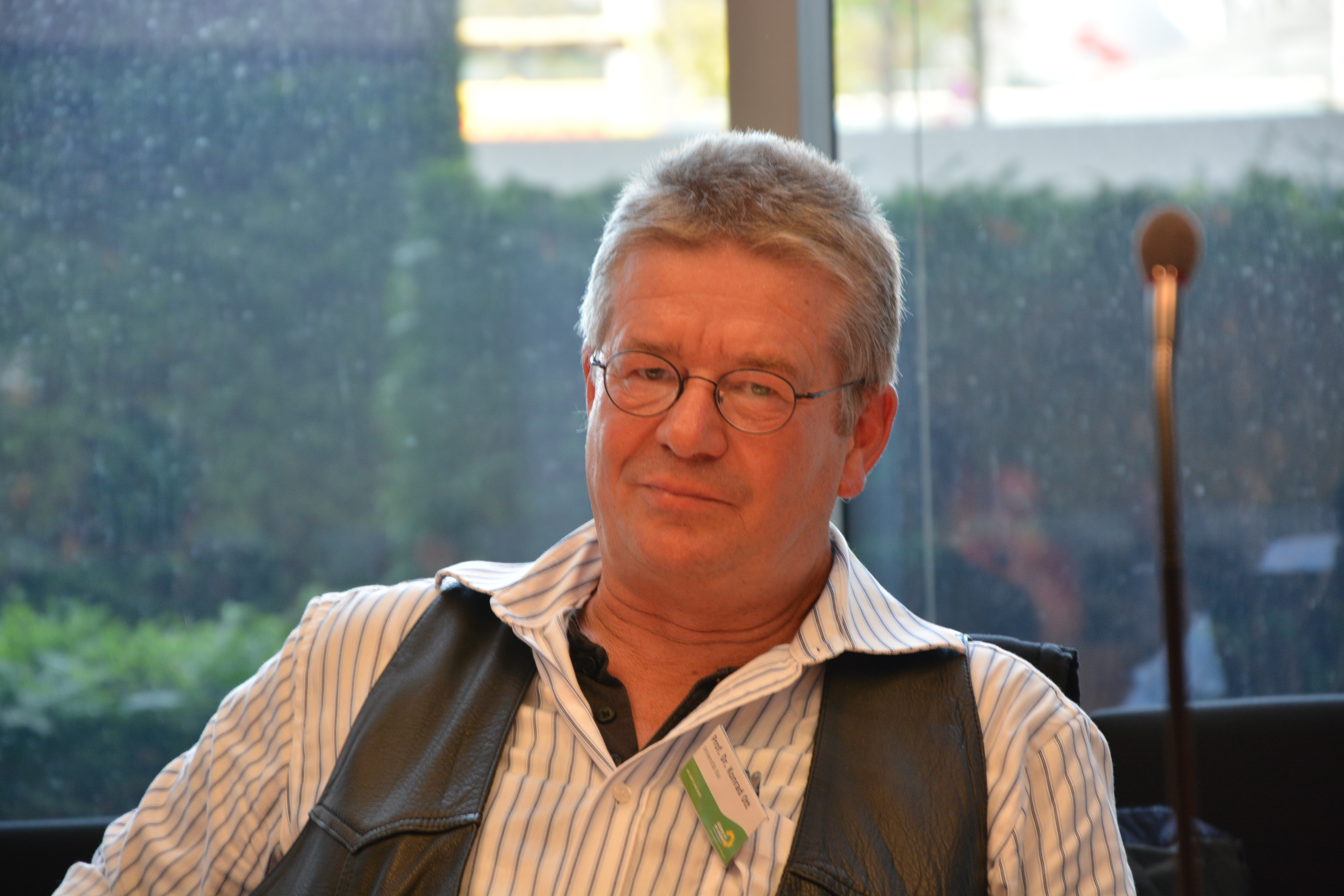
Konrad Ott (2014)

Konrad Ott (born 20 May 1959) is a German philosopher with a special interest in discourse ethics and environmental ethics.

== Biography ==
Konrad Ott was born in 1959 in Bergkamen, West Germany. From 1982 to 1986, he studied philosophy, history and German philology at the Goethe University Frankfurt. He completed his PhD thesis on Menschenkenntnis als Wissenschaft. Über die Entstehung und Logik der Historie als der Wissenschaft vom Individuellen under the supervision of Jürgen Habermas at the same institution in 1989. He is regarded as a representative of the Frankfurt School's third generation.

Ott is currently Professor for Philosophy and Ethics of the Environment at Kiel University. From 2000 to 2008 he was a member of the German Advisory Council on the Environment. From 1997 to 2012 Ott was professor for environmental ethics at the University of Greifswald. Ott is also known as a critic of mass migration to Europe. Regarding migration from Africa via the Mediterranean, Ott postulated in 2018 that "this route must be dried out"; the merit of Italy's Home Office Secretary Matteo Salvini should be acknowledged "at least [...] to have made this route less attractive".

== Bibliography ==
In German:

- Ökologie und Ethik: Ein Versuch praktischer Philosophie. Tübingen 1993
- Vom Begründen zum Handeln: Aufsätze zur angewandten Ethik. Tübingen 1996
- Ipso facto: Zur ethischen Begründung normativer Implikate wissenschaftlicher Praxis. Frankfurt am Main 1997
- Ethik in der Informatik. Tübingen 1999 (as co-editor)
- Spektrum der Umweltethik. Marburg 2000 (as co-editor)
- Moralbegründungen zur Einführung. Hamburg 2001; Zweite Auflage 2005
- Theorie und Praxis starker Nachhaltigkeit. Marburg 2004; Zweite Auflage 2008 (as co-author)
- Umweltethik zur Einführung. Hamburg 2010
- Zuwanderung und Moral. Stuttgart 2016
- Naturethik und biblische Schöpfungserzählung. Ein diskurstheoretischer und narrativ-hermeneutischer Brückenschlag. (Together with Christof Hardmeier.) Stuttgart 2015
- Umweltethik. In: Kirchhoff, Thomas (ed.): Online Encyclopedia Philosophy of Nature / Online Lexikon Naturphilosophie. Heidelberg 2020, https://doi.org/10.11588/oepn.2020.0.68742

In English:

- The Case for Strong Sustainability
- "Building a 'theory of sustainable development': two salient conceptions within the German discourse (as co-author)". Inderscience Publishers.
- On Substantiating the Conception of Strong Sustainability
- Environmental Ethics. In: Kirchhoff, Thomas (ed.): Online Encyclopedia Philosophy of Nature / Online Lexikon Naturphilosophie. Heidelberg 2020, https://doi.org/10.11588/oepn.2020.0.71420
