= Josef Ledwohn =

German politician

Josef Ledwohn (24 October 1907 – 4 October 2003) was a prominent German trade unionist and Communist Party official who became an anti-Nazi resistance activist in 1933. He resurfaced in what became the British occupation zone after 1945 and was then, between 1946 and 1954, a leading member of the state parliament ("Landtag") in the newly reconfigured state of North Rhine-Westphalia. He was a leading exponent of German reunification, albeit under conditions to be determined by the East German ruling SED party and the residuum in the west of the old German Communist Party (which by this stage was widely perceived in West Germany as an ill-disguised proxy for Soviet imperialist ambitions).

== Life ==
=== Provenance and early years ===
Josef Ledwohn was born in Rünthe, a mining village (subsequently subsumed into Unna district) a short distance outside Dortmund, to its east. His father worked as a miner. He grew up in the nearby town of Ahlen which is where between 1914 and 1922 he attended school. He joined the Young Socialist Workers in 1922 and more briefly, in 1926/27, the Social Democratic Party. He also became a member of the Young Communists in 1927, then joining the Communist Party in 1929.

=== Political activism in the German ("Weimar") Republic ===
Between 1922 and 1925 Ledwohn undertook an apprenticeship in metal work and as an electrician. Already, in 1922, he had joined the Allgemeine Deutsche Arbeiterverbrüderung (loosely, "General German Workers' Brotherhood"). He remained in Ahlen, working in his chosen trade between 1927 and 1931, when he lost his job. A lengthy period of unemployment followed. During this period he was actively involved with "Red Aid", Workers International Relief ("Internationale Arbeiterhilfe") and the Alliance of Red-Front Fighters ("Roter Frontkämpferbund").

During 1928 he attended the Young Communists' State Academy ("KJV-Reichsschule") in Dresden, later becoming a "policy leader" ("Polleiter") with the local group in Ahlen. He also served as an Agitation and Propaganda leader for the Young Communist sub-district leadership ("Unterbezirksleitung") for the wider Hamm region. Them, after joining the Communist Party in 1929, in 1930 Josef Ledwohn undertook his first visit to Moscow. In 1932, he became a "policy leader" for the Communist Party sub-district leadership in Ahlen. At this stage he retained his links to the Young Communists. In 1932, he became the "policy leader" for the Young Communists with responsibility for the entire Ruhr region. By 1933 he had also become a member of the DMV ("Deutscher Metallarbeiter-Verband" / Metal Workers' Union), and was employed as a union official.

In June 1932 Ledwohn faced a special court in Münster at which he was tried and convicted for "Serious Breach of the Peace and Disturbance" ("Rädelführerschaft bei schwerem Landfriedensbruch und Aufruhr"). The court case arose in connection with the part he had played in an "unemployment demonstration". He was sentenced to a twelve month jail term. The early 1930s were a period of dangerously accelerating political polarisation, however, which the government was desperately keen to try and defuse. After slightly more than four months Ledwohn was released in good time for Christmas, a beneficiary of the so-called Schleicher Amnesty.

=== Nazi dictatorship ===
National Socialists took power in January 1933 and lost no time in transforming Germany into a one-party dictatorship. In the aftermath of the Reichstag fire, which occurred near the end of February 1933, it very quickly became clear that while all opposition parties were now banned, the government viewed with a particular sense of urgency the need to enforce the ban with respect to active Communist Party officials and leaders. At this stage the government still had access to Communist Party membership lists that were relatively up to date, and on 28 February 1933, like a large number of party comrades, Josef Ledwohn was arrested in a street raid. Between February and December 1933 he was held in a succession of prisons in the area: he also spent time at the newly established Esterwegen concentration camp to the north.

He faced the district high court ("Oberlandesgericht") in Hamm in December 1933 on the usual charge, under these circumstances, of "Preparing to commit High Treason" ("Vorbereitung zum Hochverrat") and received a further jail term, this time of thirty months. (Note: It would have been normal for the nine or ten months Ledwohn had already spent in pre-trial detention to be offset against the thirty month jail term. That appears not to have happened on this occasion, however.) He was held firstly at the Aschendorfer Moor Concentration Camp and then at Werl Prison, from where, on 2 May 1936, he was released. From 1936 till 1938 he was based in Stettin, working as an electrician. Between 1936 and 1945 he worked as an electrician and on manhole construction/maintenance in various parts of Germany including Salzgitter, Upper Silesia, the Saarland and Mährisch-Ostrau (as "Ostrava" was known at that time). He was again actively involved in communist resistance. It is known that between 1943 and 1945 he was a member of the (by now highly illegal) Communist Party in both the Ruhr region and Hindenburg in Upper Silesia (known since) 1945 as Zabrze).

=== After the war ===
War in Europe ended, formally, in May 1945, leaving large part of northwest Germany, including Ledwohn's home region, administered as the British occupation zone. In May 1949, the zone would be incorporated into a relaunched US sponsored state, the German Federal Republic (West Germany). 1945 found Josef Ledwohn already working as an electrician in Essen and involved in re-establishing the (no longer illegal) Communist Party in the Ruhr region. He was close to the leadership of the relaunched IG Bergbau trades union (and presumably a union member). Sources refer to Ledwohn having become a Communist Party official in nearby Herne (Ruhr) during 1945, a capacity in which he was still active in 1948. He also served at this time as a temporary deputy chair of the regional party executive ("Landesvorstand") for the wider region that would be relaunched, in 1946, as the state of North Rhine-Westphalia.

Between 1946 and 1949, according to one normally authoritative source, Josef Ledwohn was a member of the party executive ("Parteivorstand" - forerunner of the "Party Central Committee") of the Socialist Unity Party ("Sozialistische Einheitspartei Deutschlands" / SED). The SED was launched in Berlin in April 1946 through a contentious merger between the Communist Party and the Social Democratic Party. The merger was effective in the Soviet occupation zone and there was every indication that the architects of the SED intended that the new party should take root across all four occupation zones, but in the event it never found traction in the American, British and French zones. The formal status of Ledwohn's SED membership is unclear but it was in any case clearly anomalous that Josef Ledwohn, as a leading member of the Communist Party (based in the British occupation zone) held a position of significant influence within its SED sister party (based in the Soviet occupation zone - after October 1949 the German Democratic Republic / East Germany). By the time the three western occupation zones were merged and relaunched, in May 1949, as the German Federal Republic (West Germany), there was a widespread perception in "the west" that Josef Ledwohn was "Moscow's man" in West Germany. That was the context through which Josef Ledwohn's repeated calls for German reunification during the late 1940s and early 1950s were seen in West Germany.

During 1946/47 Ledwohn was successively third secretary, first secretary and then chairman of the Communist Party leadership team ("Bezirksleitung") for the economically important and politically vital Ruhr region. In 1947 he was an attendee at the regional party academy ("Landesparteischule"). In 1949 he became a member of the [West German] national party executive ("Parteivorstand"). Between 1949 and 1956 he served as chairman of the party state leadership ("Landesleitung") for North Rhine-Westphalia.

The Provincial Council of Westphalia convened for the first (and last) time on 30 April 1946. Members were appointed by the political parties in proportions reflecting votes cast in the November 1932 election, generally held to have been Germany's most recent free and fair political election. Party comrades nominated for membership of the council also included Max Reimann and Willy Perk. Communist council members joined with others, such as Friedrich Rische and Walter Jarrek, to build up a powerful party organisational structure in the Ruhr Region. Within the Provincial Council, Josef Ledwohn was elected to lead the Communist Party group. At the end of 1946 the territories of Westphalia and the Rhine Province were merged to form the Federal State of North Rhine-Westphalia. Ledwohn's membership of the Provincial Council was carried across to the State Parliament (Landtag) of this new regional entity. He also, initially, retained leadership of the Communist Party parliamentary group. When the nominated assembly gave way to an elected state parliament Ledwohn again retained his seat, remaining a state parliamentarian. He lost his leadership of the parliamentary group in 1947 but remained influential as a member of the party's top team in and outside the state parliament at least until his arrest in 1954, which was followed by his exclusion from the assembly.

=== Arrest and conviction ===
Cold War tensions remained acute during the early 1950s and Soviet involvement the brutal suppression of the East German uprising in June 1953 fed an intensified mistrust in West Germany of the (pro-Soviet) Communist Party which in the 1953 general election achieved slightly above 2% of the national vote. That was the context in which, on 27 June 1954, Max Reimann and Josef Ledwohn were deprived of their parliamentary immunity. Ledwohn was arrested in August 1954. The charge under which he was arrested was the familiar one of "Preparing to commit High Treason" ("Vorbereitung zum Hochverrat"). Shortly after his arrest Friedel Ledwohn, his wife, emerged briefly from the shadows, opening a party meeting in Hamburg and receiving (according to a report in a politically sympathetic newspaper) congratulations from comrades as the wife of the imprisoned "patriot Josef Ledwohn".

The more immediate trigger for Ledwohn's arrest was a cabinet meeting held on 12 May 1954 in Bonn. The ninth point on the agenda was headed "Programme for National Reunification" ("Programm der Nationalen Wiedervereinigung") and was introduced with a briefing from the Justice Minister who informed colleagues that the West German Supreme Court had recently determined that the Communist Party's Programme for National Reunification constituted preparation for high treason. Several defendants had been identified and convicted of "Preparing to commit High Treason" and one had already been arrested. Legal principle required that further arrests should be made of remaining members of the Communist Party national executive and of certain other party officials. Discussion followed on the possible lifting of political immunity from affected Communist members of the state parliaments. An additional political dimension as added to cabinet deliberations by the fact that regional elections were scheduled for July 1954. The Communist Party's "Programme for National Reunification" had been adopted by the party national executive on 2 November 1952, and called for German reunification on terms intended make West Germany part of a united Germany ruled by the East German SED (party) from a reunified Berlin, and moving the so-called Iron Curtain from the Inner German border to the existing West German frontier with Benelux, France, Switzerland and Austria. Ledwohn was indeed a longstanding advocate of such a development. The party's 1952 "Programme for National Reunification" was far from anodyne in its phraseology. The "Adenauer regime should be overthrown and a free, unified, independent, democratic and peace loving Germany" should be created. (Note: "...Regime Adenauer gestürzt und auf den Trümmern dieses Regimes ein freies, einheitliches, unabhängiges, demokratisches und friedliebendes Deutschland geschaffen".) Only the "irreconcilable and revolutionary struggle by all democratic patriots" could and would "lead to the overthrow of the Adenauer regime and thereby to the removal of the decisive support of American imperialist hegemony in West Germany. (Note: ...nur der "unversöhnliche und revolutionäre Kampf aller demokratischen Patrioten" könnte und würde "zum Sturz des Adenauer-Regimes und damit zur Beseitigung der entscheidenden Stütze der Herrschaft der amerikanischen Imperialisten in Westdeutschland führen".)

Other party comrades arrested in connection with the affair, for whose own trials the Ledwohn case would be a template, included Walter Fisch, Friedrich Rische and Richard Scheringer. They all faced trial at the Supreme Court in Karlsruhe. Josef Ledwohn was sentenced on 17 July 1956 for "Preparing to commit High Treason" to three and a half years in prison. In setting conditions for his sentence his time in pre-trial detention was taken into account, and he was accordingly released on 4 December 1957. Ledwohn's prison term was combined with a four year deprivation of citizen's rights.

=== Later years ===
At the start of 1954 the death of the liberal president of the Federal Constitutional Court, Hermann Höpker-Aschoff, had cleared the way for the appointment of a court president who might be more sympathetic to Chancellor Adenauer's deep-seated hostility to the constitutional role of the Communist Party in West Germany. The new court president, Josef Wintrich, despite being a mainstream conservative from Adenauer's own party, thought it prudent to minimise his personal involvement in the case and the entire process of banning the party continued to progress only haltingly; but on 17 August 1956, exactly one month after Ledwohn's own sentencing, the party was outlawed in West Germany. The West German court's writ did not run in East Germany, however, and between 1956 and 1968 Josef Ledwohn was a member of the Central Committee of the (West German) Communist Party, based in East Berlin (thereby in East Germany).

During the 1960s tensions eased slightly between East and West. In West Germany the launch of the German Communist Party ("Deutsche Kommunistische Partei" / DKP) in 1968 represented, in the eyes of many, a cautious relaunch with a new name of the banned Communist Party of Germany ("Kommunistische Partei Deutschlands" / KPD). Josef Ledwohn joined the rebranded West German communist party that same year, becoming a member of the State Committee for North Rhine-Westphalia. He also became a member of the Party Executive ("Parteivortand"). The party's electoral performance in West Germany during the 1970s and 1980s was nevertheless very much worse, even, than the performance achieved by the previous communist party before it was outlawed in 1956. In January 1975 Josef Ledwohn moved permanently to East Germany where, like other loyal comrades in that country, he became a member of the ruling Socialist Unity Party. He took work in East Berlin as a researcher and department head at the Marxism-Leninism Institute of the Party Central Committee. It was also in 1975 that he started to draw his pension.

Josef Ledwohn died a few days short of his ninety-sixth birthday in October 2003. In East Germany his record of commitment to the communist cause would normally have led to a place of honour for his mortal remains. with those of others honoured by The Party, at the Socialists' Memorial in the Friedrichsfelde Central Cemetery at Lichtenberg (Berlin). However, he had managed to outlive the German Democratic Republic by more than a decade. His ashes ended up in an anonymous shared location at the edge of the cemetery.

== Awards and honours ==
- 1977 Patriotic Order of Merit
- 1982 Order of Karl Marx
