= Ministry of Agriculture, Domains and Forests (Prussia) =

Government ministry in Prussia

The Prussian Ministry of Agriculture, Domains and Forestry (German: Ministerium für Landwirtschaft, Domänen und Forsten was the Ministry of Agriculture of the State of Prussia. It was established in the Kingdom of Prussia in 1848 and continued to exist in the Free State of Prussia. In 1935, the ministry was merged with the Reich Ministry of Food and Agriculture. The official headquarters was in Berlin.

== History ==
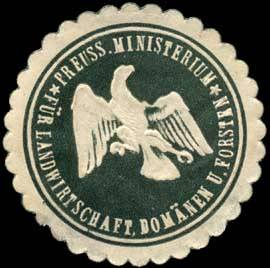
Seal of the Prussian Ministry of Agriculture, Domains and Forestry

The establishment of the ministry was initiated by point 5 of King Frederick William IV's decree of June 25, 1848 to the State Ministry requiring that the administration of agricultural affairs should be separated from the Ministry of Trade, Industry and Public Works and a separate ministry should be formed. Frederick William IV chose the city's general counsel, Rudolf Eduard Julius Gierke, to appoint as Minister of State.

The ministry's initial responsibilities initially included the agricultural police, the regulation of the landlord-peasant relationships, the division of the commons (dissolution of the commons), the replacement of the feudal burdens, the fisheries police as well as the supervision of the institutions for the promotion of agriculture and the agricultural educational institutions.

=== Expansions ===
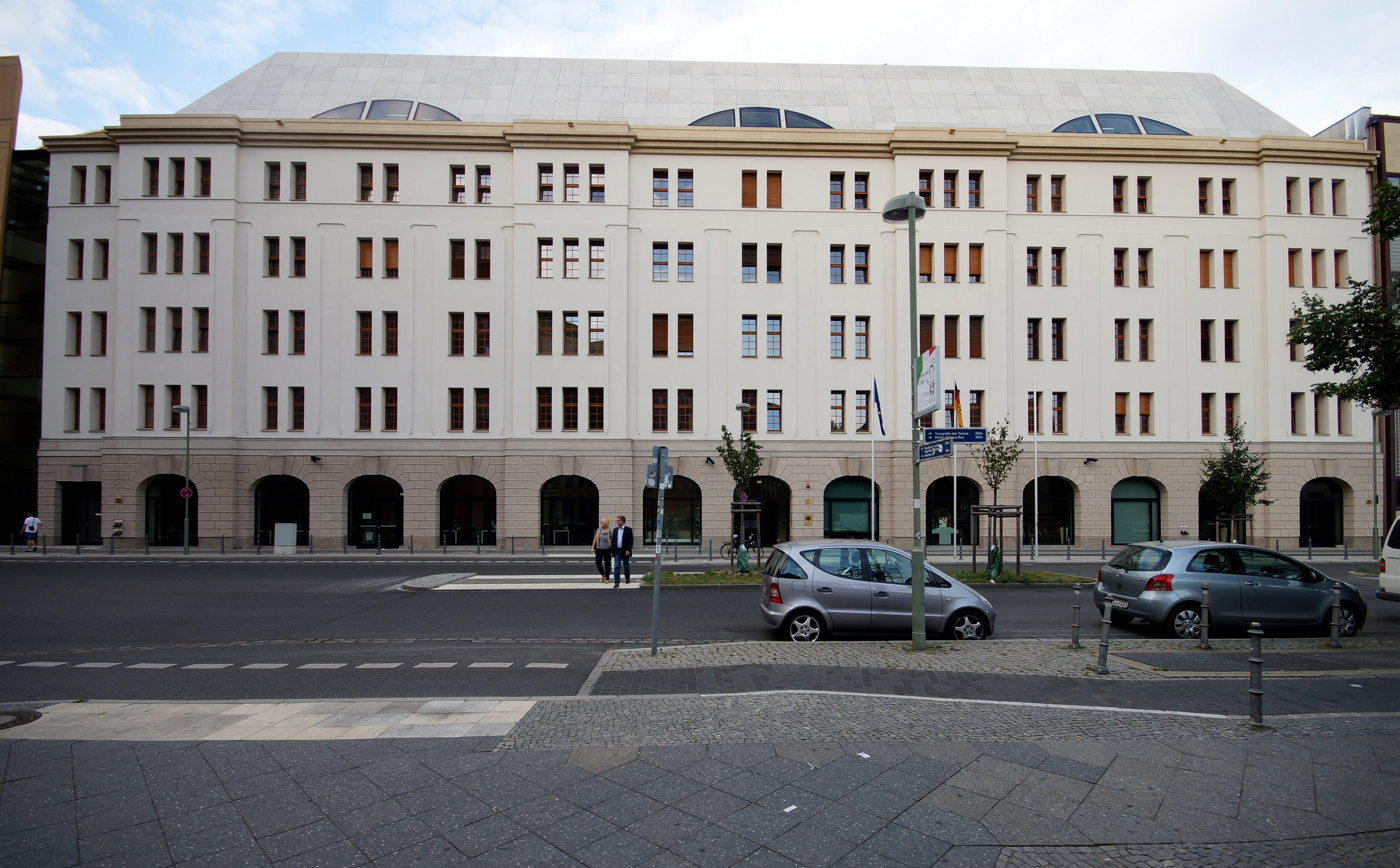
Office building at Stresemannstrasse 128, 2014

The ministry's areas of responsibility were gradually expanded to include the stud system (on August 11, 1848), the consultation on veterinary police matters (on June 22, 1849), the dike system (on November 26, 1849), the co-supervision of the pension banks (on March 2, 1850) and the implementation of the hunting police law (on March 7, 1850). On April 27, 1872, the veterinary sector was separated from the Ministry of the Interior and assigned to the Ministry of Agriculture. With effect from the decrees of April 10, 1874 and August 13, 1876, the ministry was assigned the supervision of agricultural credit institutions and participation in the supervision of non-agricultural basic credit institutions.

By further Royal decree of August 7, 1878 and, by law of March 13, 1879, the domains and forests areas were separated from the Ministry of Finance and integrated into the Ministry of Agriculture, which was at the same time renamed the Prussian Ministry for Agriculture, Domains and Forests.

At the turn of the century, the ministry was divided into three departments: the department for agricultural and stud farm affairs, the department for domains and the department for forestry and hunting matters. The department for agricultural and stud farm affairs was responsible for supervising the state economics college, the agricultural colleges, the higher regional cultural court, the central moor commission, the agricultural credit institutions, the main and state stud farms as well as the technical deputation for the veterinary sector along with the veterinary universities in Berlin. The department for forestry and hunting matters supervised the forestry examination commission and the forestry academies.

=== Post World War I ===
After World War I, the ministry continued to exist in the Free State of Prussia with offices at Leipziger Platz, which was expanded between 1913 and 1919 with an extension at Königgrätzer Straße (from 1930 Stresemannstraße). In the course of the dissolution of the Ministry of Public Works, the departments for Water Management and Water Law were assigned to the Ministry of Agriculture in 1921. The ministry was later divided into the central office, the central administration of the Department of Domains and Forestry, the Agriculture Department, the Domain Department, the Forestry Department, the Stud Farm Department, the Veterinary Department and the Water Management Department.

On January 1, 1935, the ministry was incorporated into the Reich Ministry of Food and Agriculture, which was founded in 1919 and was called the "Reich and Prussian Ministry for Food and Agriculture" until 1938.
