= Ministry of Trade, Commerce and Public Works (Prussia) =

Government ministry in Prussia

The Ministry of Trade, Commerce and Public Works was a ministry in Prussia that was founded in 1848. Its beginnings date back to 1740. In 1878, it became the Ministry of Trade and Commerce by spinning off the Ministry of Public Works, which was dissolved in 1921; the responsibilities were transferred back to the Ministry of Agriculture, Domains and Forestry and of Trade and Commerce. In 1932, it became the Ministry of Economy and Labor.

== History ==
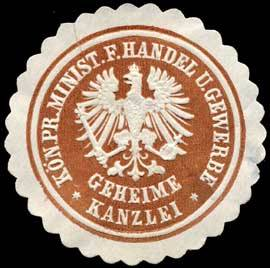
Seal of Royal Prussian Ministry of Trade and Commerce

In 1740, the Prussian King Frederick II founded the "Department for Factories, Commerce and Manufacturing" when he took office, which corresponded to a ministry of economics in the administrative structure at the time. The responsible ministers (who, however, usually covered other areas of responsibility) were also called Trade Ministers. There were corresponding ministers before, but they were responsible for many areas.

In the first half of the 19th century, this area of responsibility was managed as a department (section) of the Ministry of the Interior. However, several section heads already had the title of Minister or were referred to as Trade Ministers by their contemporaries.

On 17 April 1848, an independent ministry was formed, the official name of which was the Ministry of Trade, Commerce and Public Works.

The service building was the former gold and silver factory in Berlin's Friedrichstadt, Wilhelmstrasse 79. In 1854–1855, the building was expanded by another floor according to plans by Friedrich August Stüler, and in 1868 the adjacent new building at Wilhelmstrasse 80 was added.

On 17 April 1878, the Public Works, including infrastructure and construction administration, was spun off as the Ministry of Public Works, leaving the Ministry of Trade and Commerce. However, both ministries were run concurrently until 1879.

=== Post World War I ===
In 1917, the Reich Economic Office was established and, in 1919, the Federal Ministry of Economic Affairs was created. By law of August 15, 1921, the Ministry of Public Works was dissolved. Its responsibilities, including the remaining responsibilities for the railway system, largely fell back to the Ministry of Commerce, which at that time was called the Ministry of Agriculture, Domains and Forestry and of Trade and Commerce. The state construction administration was ultimately affiliated to the Ministry of Finance, as was already the case in other German states.

In 1932, the name Ministry of Economics and Labor was introduced under the Prussian coup d'état (German: Preußenschlag).

== See also ==
- Reich Ministry of Transport
