= List of agriculture ministers of Prussia =

Government official in Prussia

The below is a list of Ministers of the Ministry of Agriculture, Domains and Forests of Prussia who was often referred to as the Minister of Agriculture.

== History ==
The Prussian Minister of Agriculture, Domains and Forestry was the Minister of Agriculture of the State of Prussia. It was established in the Kingdom of Prussia in 1848 and continued to exist in the Free State of Prussia. In 1935, the ministry was merged with the Reich Ministry of Food and Agriculture. The official headquarters was in Berlin.

== List of agriculture ministers ==
Name	Image	Term Start	Term End	Notes
Rudolf Eduard Julius Gierke	Rudolf Eduard Julius Gierke	1848	1848	
Otto Theodor von Manteuffel	Otto Theodor von Manteuffel	1848	1850	
Ferdinand Otto Wilhelm Henning von Westphalen		1850	1854	Interim
Karl Otto von Manteuffel	Karl Otto von Manteuffel	1854	1858	
Erdmann von Pückler		1858	1862	
Heinrich Friedrich August von Itzenplitz		1862	1862	
Werner Ludolph Erdmann von Selchow		1862	1873	
Otto von Königsmarck		1873	1873	
Heinrich Karl Julius von Achenbach	Heinrich von Achenbach	1873	1874	
Karl Rudolf Friedenthal	Karl Rudolf Friedenthal	1874	1879	
Robert Sigmund Maria Joseph Lucius von Ballhausen	Robert Lucius von Ballhausen	1879	1890	
Wilhelm Carl Heinrich von Heyden-Cadow		1890	1894	
Ernst von Hammerstein-Loxten		1894	1901	
Victor Adolf Theophil von Podbielski	Victor von Podbielski	1901	1906	Son of Eugen Anton Theophil von Podbielski
Johann Friedrich Bernd von Arnim Criewen	Bernd von Arnim	1906	1910	
Clemens August Freiherr von Schorlemer-Lieser	Clemens von Schorlemer-Lieser	1910	1917	
Paul von Eisenhart-Rothe		1917	1918	
Otto Braun	Otto Braun	1918	1921	
Hermann Warmbold	Hermann Warmbold	1921	1921	
Hugo Wendorff		1921	1925	
Heinrich Steiger		1925	1932	
Alfred Hugenberg	Wahlplakat für Hugenberg	1933	1933	
Walther Darré	Walther Darré	1933	1945	

== See also ==
- Reich Ministry of Food and Agriculture
- Federal Ministry of Food and Agriculture (Germany)
