= Karl von Bodelschwingh-Velmede =

Prussian politician (1800–1873)

Ludwig Carl Christian Gisbert Friedrich von Bodelschwingh auf Velmede (10 December 1800 – 12 May 1873) was a Prussian politician.

== Early life ==
Von Bodelschwingh-Velmede was born in Velmede, near Hamm in the County of Mark as the son of Franz Christoph Gisbert Friedrich Wilhelm von Bodelschwingh, Herr auf Velmede (1754–1827) and his wife Friederike Charlotte Sophie Wilhelmine Henriette von Bodelschwingh, née Freiin von Plettenberg.

== Career ==
After serving as a one-year volunteer in the Guards Rifles Battalion he studied law, and then entered public life, serving in a string of posts from 1837 to 1845: as Landtag in Hamm, Oberregierungsrat in Minden, vice-president of the Regierungsbezirk of Münster, and president of the Regierungsbezirk of Arnsberg.

In 1849 he entered politics at the Prussian level, entering the Abgeordnetenhaus (the Prussian lower house) as a conservative delegate for Conservative Party (Prussia). He served as Finance Minister from 1851 to 1858 under Otto Theodor von Manteuffel in Manteuffel cabinet and again from 1862 to 1866 under Otto von Bismarck in Bismarck-Roon cabinet He resigned in 1866 from an unwillingness to take on the responsibility of procuring funds for the Austro-Prussian War.

His brother, Ernst von Bodelschwingh-Velmede, was also active in Prussian politics.
