= Ernst von Bodelschwingh-Velmede =

Prussian politician (1794–1854)

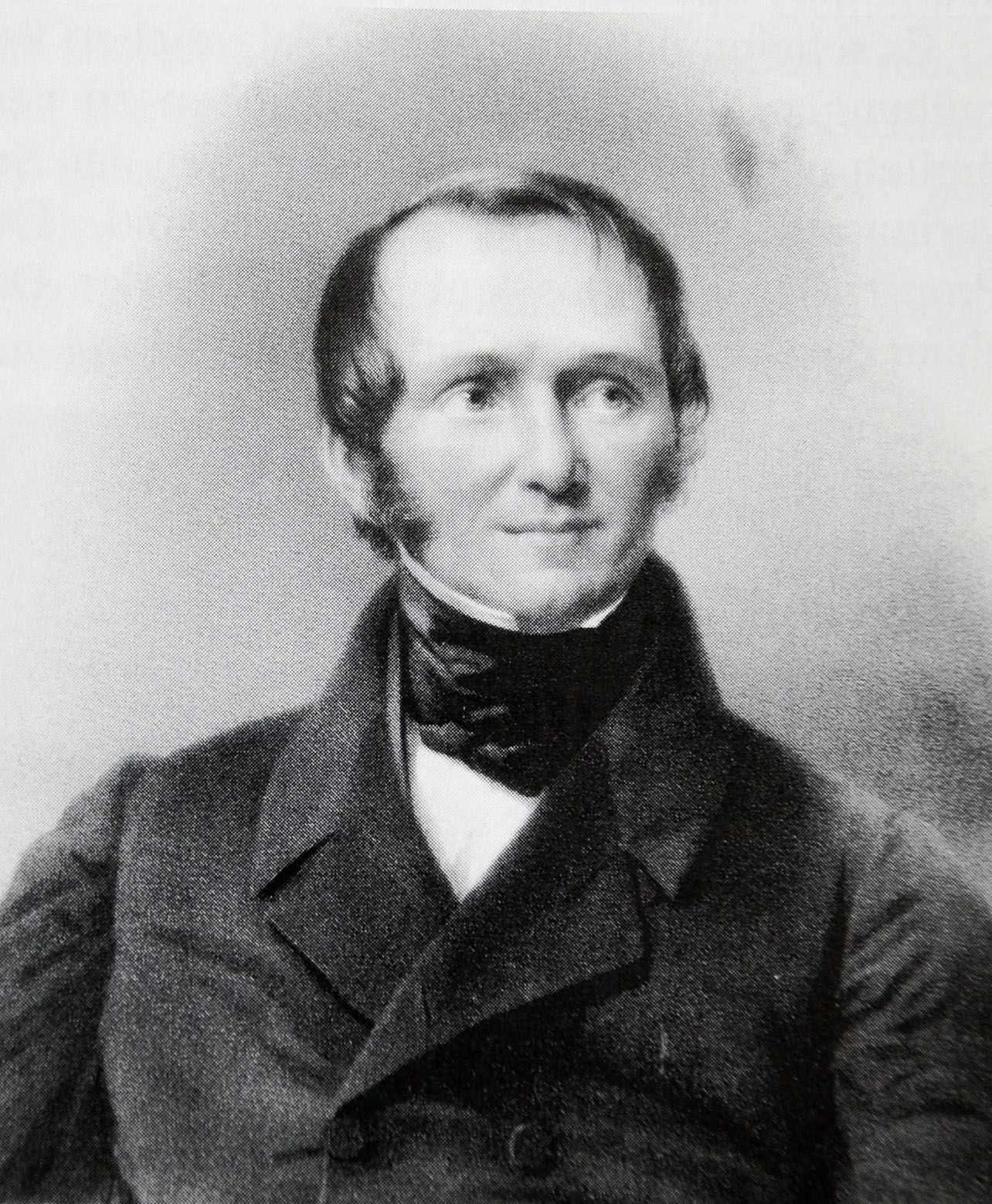
Ernst von Bodelschwingh-Velmede.

Ernst Albert Karl Wilhelm Ludwig von Bodelschwingh auf Velmede (26 November 1794 – 18 May 1854) was a Prussian politician for Conservative Party.

Bodelschwingh-Velmede was born in Velmede, near Hamm in the County of Mark as the son of Franz Christoph Gisbert Friedrich Wilhelm von Bodelschwingh, Herr auf Velmede (1754–1827) and his wife Friederike Charlotte Sophie Wilhelmine Henriette von Bodelschwingh, née Freiin von Plettenberg. He studied Law and Cameralism at the University of Berlin and the University of Göttingen. He participated in the Freiheitskriege ("liberty wars"), and at Leipzig earned the Iron Cross first class; he was heavily wounded at Freiburg on 21 October 1813. He subsequently completed his studies at the University of Berlin, and in 1817 entered government service. From 1822 he was a district administrator (Landrat) of Kreis Tecklenburg in Westphalia, from 1831 president of the Regierungsbezirk of Trier and, from November 1834 to 1842, Oberpräsident of the Rhine Province, in which he served during a turbulent time.

In 1842, Bodelschwingh-Velmede became Prussian finance minister and the interior minister in 1845. In 1847, he attempted to lead the United Diet (Vereinigter Landtag), but failed. He did not sympathize with the Revolutions of 1848, and on 19 March resigned to enter the Prussian Abgeordnetenhaus (lower house), first in January 1849 and again after a new electoral law was imposed in 1849. He was later elected to the Erfurt city council as well. In the Prussian legislature, he supported the Unionpolitik of the government. In the legislative session from 1850 to 1851, he was leader of the Zentrumspartei. In 1852, he was appointed president of the Regierungsbezirk of Arnsberg. He died in 1854 while on an official trip to Medebach.

His brother, Karl von Bodelschwingh-Velmede, was also active in Prussian politics and was the finance minister of Prussia.
