= Karl Rudolf Friedenthal =

Prussian politician (1827–1890)

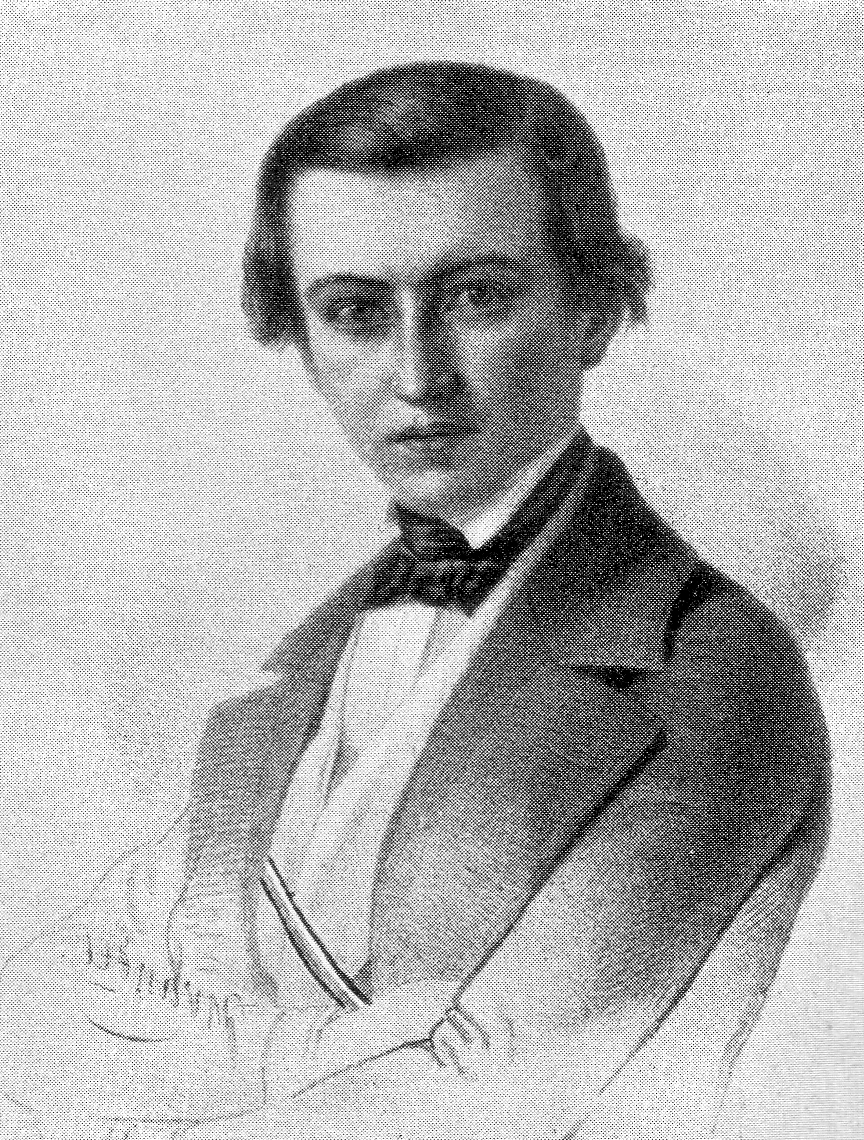
Karl Rudolf Friedenthal.

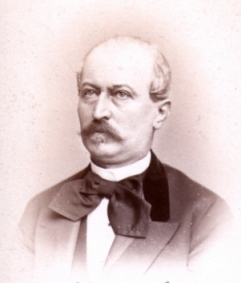
Karl Rudolf Friedenthal (1874).

Karl Rudolf Friedenthal (15 September 1827 – 7 March 1890) was a Prussian statesman.

Friedenthal was born in Breslau (Wrocław), Prussian Silesia, as a nephew of Markus Bär Friedenthal, the author, and later became a convert to Christianity (1832). He attended the gymnasium at Neisse (1839–44), studied law at Breslau, Heidelberg, and Berlin, and became (1854) Kammergerichtsassessor. He also made himself practically acquainted with agriculture in the management of his property.

In 1856, Friedenthal was elected district deputy from Neisse (Nysa), and in 1857 deputy to the Prussian Landtag. In 1860, he published the pamphlet "Salus Publica Suprema Lex," urging the reorganization of the army. Elected to the Reichstag of the North German Confederation in 1867, he joined the "Altliberalen," but after the following election he became a Free Conservative. Successively member of the Zollparlament and of the imperial Reichstag, Friedenthal was prominent in the proposal and passage of many bills.

During the Franco-Prussian War he took part, on Otto von Bismarck's invitation, with Moritz Karl Henning von Blanckenburg and Rudolf von Bennigsen in the deliberations at Versailles on the constitution of the German Empire. He was elected to the Prussian Chamber of Deputies in 1870 and became in 1873–74 its second vice-president. In 1874, he was appointed minister of agriculture; and in 1879 the Department of Domains and Forests, till then under the minister of finance, was put in his charge. From October 1877 to March 1878, during the absence of Friedrich Albrecht zu Eulenburg, he was head of the Ministry of the Interior. In 1879, being unable to accept Bismarck's new economic policy, he resigned, declining a patent of nobility. In the same year he was elected member of the Upper House, but in 1881 resigned, and retired to the management of his estate, Giesmannsdorf, near Neisse. Besides his doctor dissertation, "De Rerum Litigiosarum Alienatione ex Jure Romano" (1845), Friedenthal published "Reichstag und Zollparlament"
