= Prussian State Ministry =

Government of Prussia

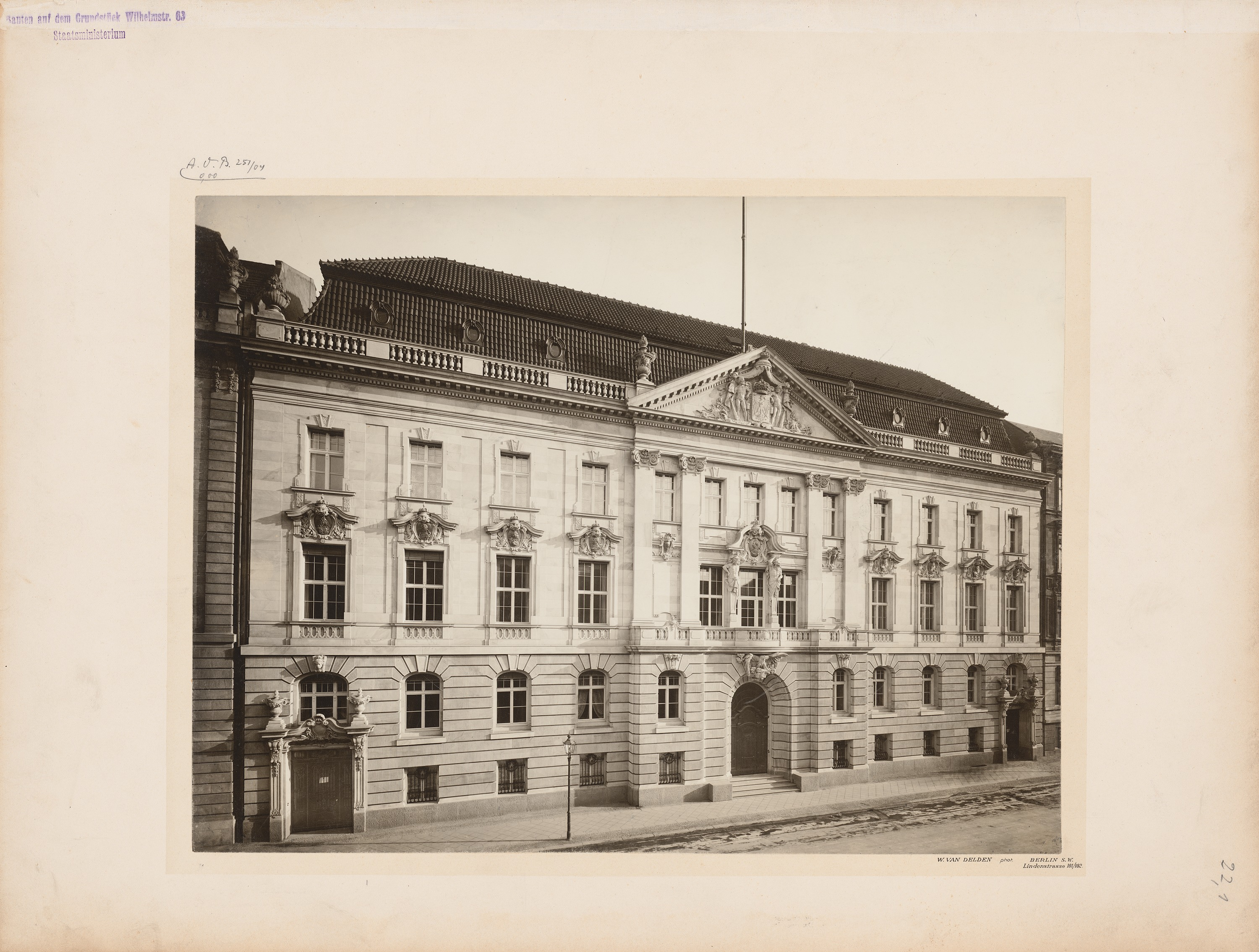
The headquarters of the Prussian State Ministry and the Chancellery at Wilhelmstrasse 63 in Berlin, c. 1904

The Prussian State Ministry (German: Preußisches Staatsministerium) from 1808 to 1850 was the executive body of ministers, subordinate to the King of Prussia and, from 1850 to 1918, the overall ministry of the State of Prussia consisting of the individual ministers. In other German states, it corresponded to the state government or the senate of a free city.

== History ==
The Prussian State Ministry met under the chairmanship of the Prime Minister. The ministers were equal while the president was primus inter pares. When the King himself presided, the state ministry was called the Privy Council. Under the Prussian Constitution, the State Ministry had to meet and lead the government in the cases under Articles 57 (convocation of the chambers to elect a regent), 58 (responsibility for all government actions until the regent is sworn in), 63 (state of emergency) and 111 (small state of siege). Additionally, the State Ministry was the highest court for misconduct by non-judicial civil servants.

The Ministry of State succeeded the General Directorate, which was responsible for internal and financial administration of the Kingdom. The General Directorate, which existed from 1723 to 1808, had been formed by King Frederick William I to consolidate the departments established during his reign to replace the corrupt Cabinet of Three Counts and reorganize the finances that had been shattered by his father, King Frederick I.

=== 1808-1848 ===
Under the reforms of 1808, the structure of the State Ministry was:

- State Chancellor
- War
- Interior Affairs (Note: The Ministry of Interior Affairs included: internal security, press censorship, schools, universities, health care, church affairs, agriculture, trade, commerce, construction, traffic, government supervision.)
  - From 1817: Spiritual, Educational and Medical Affairs (Note: In 1817, the Culture and Public Education department of the Interior became its own Ministry known as the Ministry of Spiritual, Educational and Medical Affairs by a November 1817 decree of King Frederick William III.)
  - From 1819: Interior Affairs (Note: The Interior Minister oversaw: authority supervision, economy, health.)
  - From 1819: Police (Note: The Police Minister oversaw: security, censorship, traffic, urban development.)
- Administration
- Justice (Note: From 1817 to 1848, it was divided into the Justice Administration and the Legislative Revision.)
- Foreign Affairs

=== 1848-1920 ===
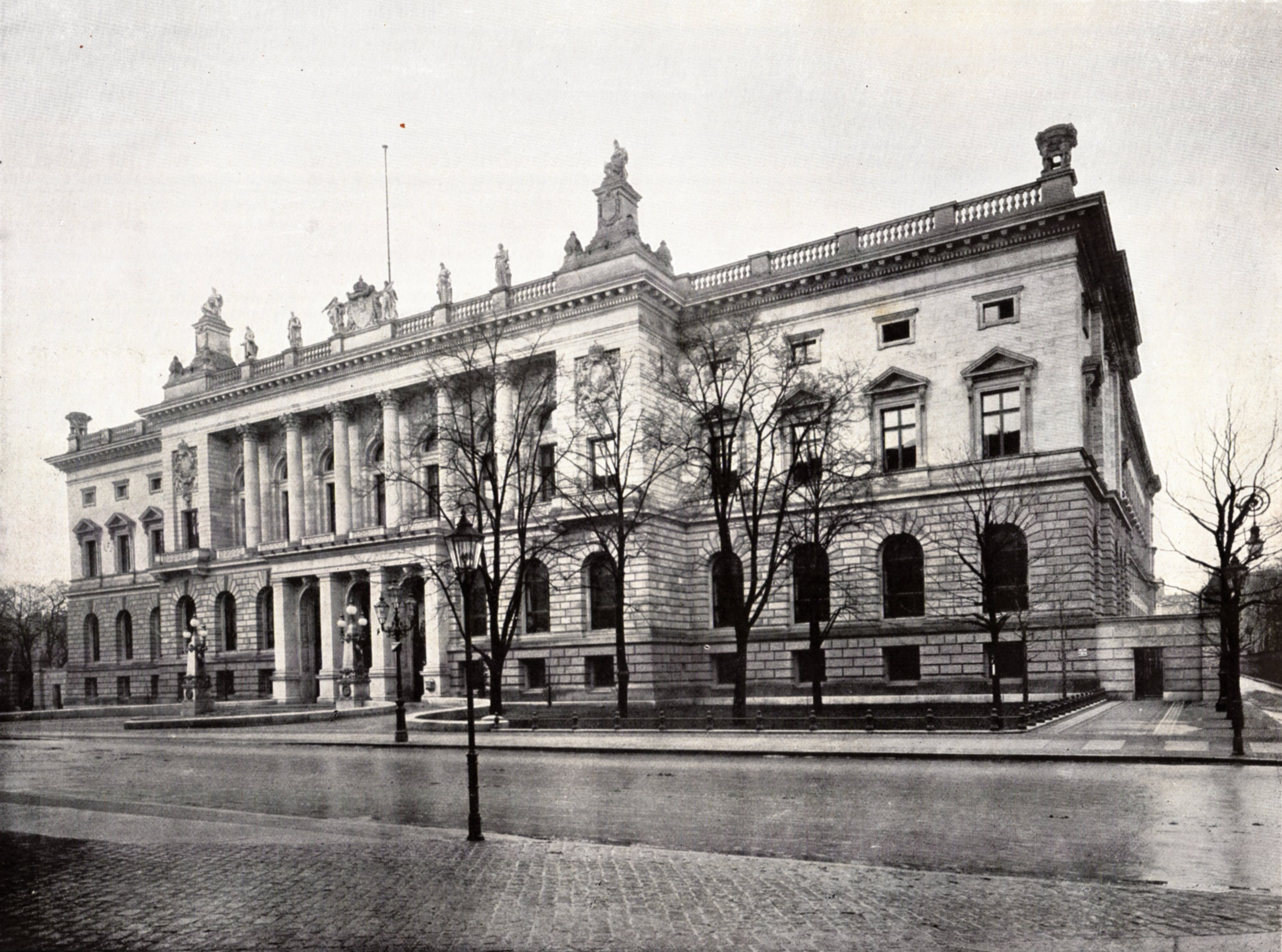
Prussian House of Representatives, c. 1900

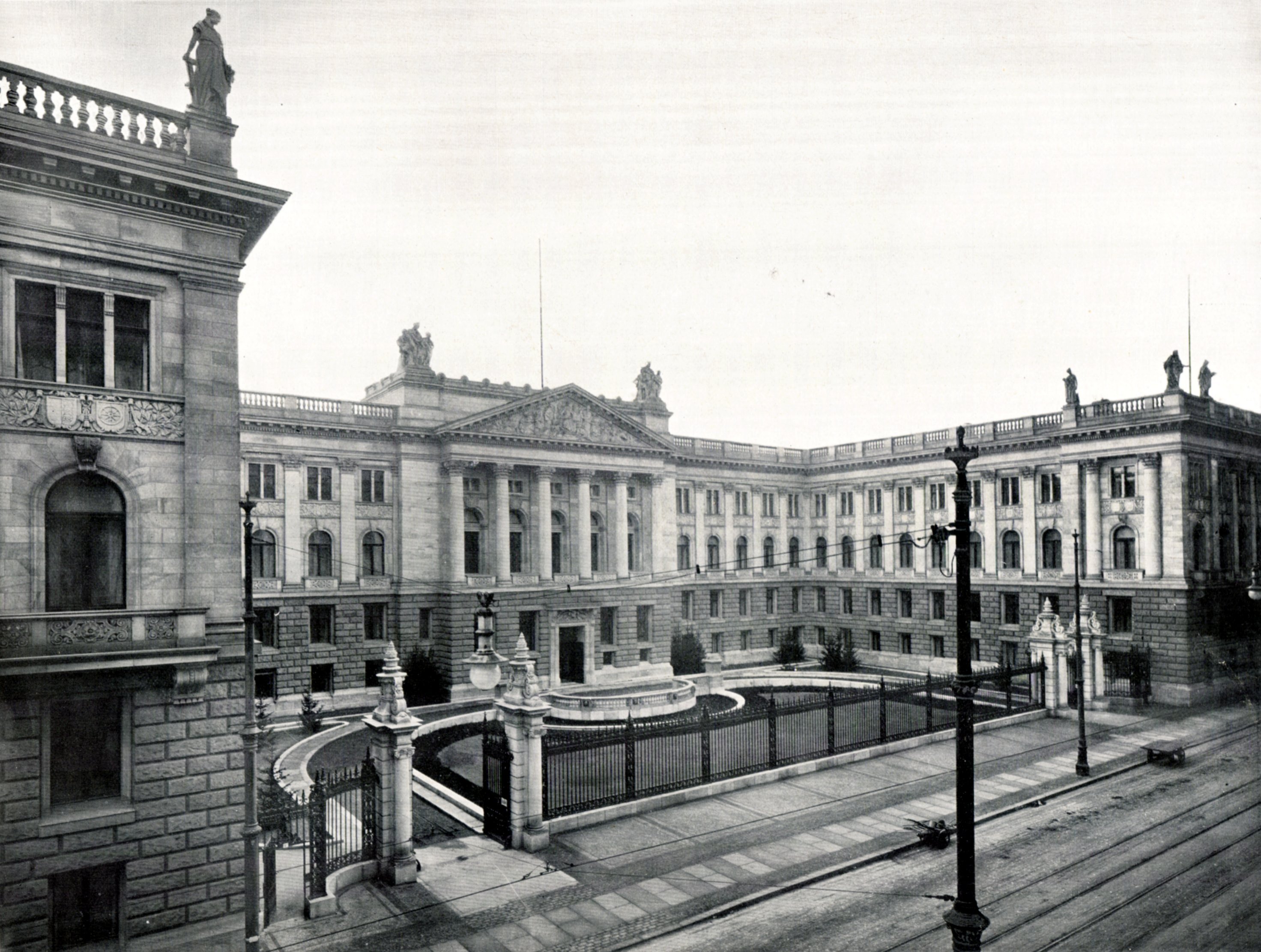
Prussian House of Lords, c. 1900

From 1848 to 1871, the State Ministry was housed at Wilhelmstrasse 74; from 1871 to 1889 at Behrenstrasse 72; and from 1889 to 1902 at Leipziger Platz 11. From 1900 to 1902, a new building was built at Wilhelmstrasse 63 for the State Ministry by Hans Altmann, Paul Kieschke and Adolf Bürckner. During the construction of the houses for the Landtag of Prussia, an intermediate building was built between the House of Lords building and the House of Representatives building for the cabinet meetings, which was connected to both buildings. From 1848 to 1920, the State Ministry was structured as follows:

- Minister President (Prime Minister)
- War
- Interior
- Finance
- Justice
- Foreign Affairs
- Spiritual, Educational and Medical Affairs
- Agriculture, Domains and Forests
- Trade and Commerce (Note: Post and telegraph systems were handed over to the North German Confederation on January 1, 1868 and Railways, Waterways and Construction spun off as the Ministry of Public Works in 1878.)

=== 1920-1945 ===
At the time of the Weimar Republic, the State Ministry name was retained for the Prussian government for reasons of tradition. The State Ministry was the organ of the cabinet, i.e. the college of Prussian ministers. Equally, it was also the State Chancellery, i.e. the office of the Prussian Prime Minister. This second function came increasingly to the fore after the German Revolution of 1918–1919.

From 1920 to 1932, with two short interruptions in 1921 and 1925, Otto Braun was Prime Minister of Prussia. His government was deposed on July 20, 1932, by Chancellor Franz von Papen under a pretext (so-called "Preußenschlag"). The imperial government administered Prussia provisionally. In April 1933, Hermann Göring was appointed Prime Minister of Prussia. The State Ministry lost most of its importance by 1935 due to the National Socialist Gleichschaltung. The sovereign rights of the states were transferred to the Third Reich. The Prussian Ministries were linked to the Reich Ministries with the Reich Ministers now also Prussian Ministers. Formally, however, there was still a Prussian Prime Minister. From 1920 to 1945, the State Ministry was structured as follows:

- Prime Minister
- Interior
- Finance
- Justice
- Science, Art and Popular Education
- Agriculture, Domains and Forests
- Trade
- Public Welfare
