= Ministry of Spiritual, Educational and Medical Affairs (Prussia) =

Government ministry in Prussia

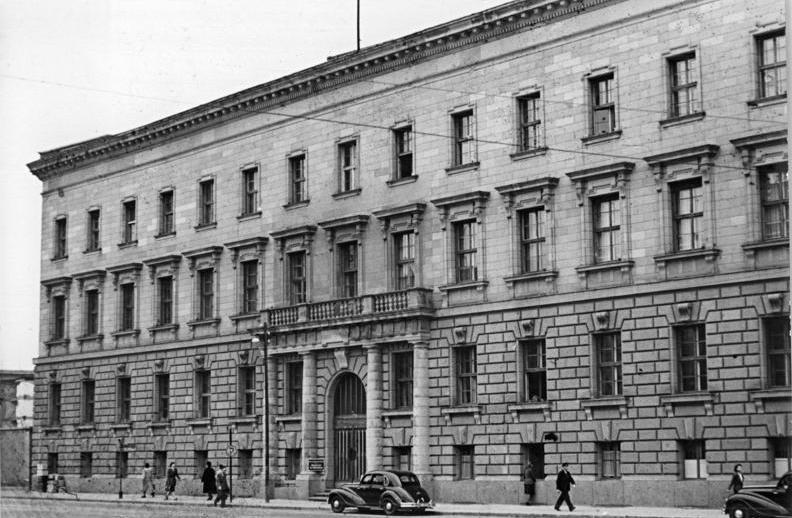
Extension building of the former Prussian Ministry of Culture in Berlin's Wilhelmstrasse, from 1934 the seat of the Reich Ministry of Education, from 1949 of the GDR Ministry of National Education, 1952

The Ministry of Spiritual, Educational and Medical Affairs was a Prussian ministry that was created in 1817 from the former department "for culture and public education" that existed from December 1808 to November 1817 and was part of the Ministry of Interior. The term "Ministry of Culture" was not used in official addresses but existed under various names and responsibilities until 1945.

== History ==
The ministry had state supervision over the churches, was responsible for the Prussian school and university system and was gradually given responsibility for the state medical administration until 1849, for which the Ministry of Interior had previously been responsible. For this task, the ministry was supported by the (royal scientific) deputation for the medical system, which was set up in 1808 and which was absorbed into the ministry in 1849. In 1839, Prussia became the first continental European country to enact laws against child labor.

The ministry's portfolio also included the Royal Prussian Academy of Sciences, the art academies, the museums, the Royal Library in Berlin, the Berlin Observatory, the Botanical Garden, the Royal Geodetic Institute in Potsdam and the Prussian Meteorological Institute in Berlin.

At the time of the Kulturkampf, the Ministry of Culture played a central role in the disputes with the Catholic Church. In response to the Vatican's disciplinary measures against opponents of the Pope's infallibility proclaimed at the Council of 1870, the ministry's Catholic Church Affairs Department passed a number of laws restricting church rights until 1874, banning the Jesuit order and withdrawing state funding from the church. After the conflict ended, Adalbert Falk resigned as Minister of Education in 1879.

=== New building ===
After the service building was expanded in 1879 with a new building at Unter den Linden 4 (today 69) based on plans by Bernhard Kühn under the direction of Adolf Bürckner in the late classicist style, an extension at Wilhelmstrasse 68 was added to the main building in 1903 due to the increasing space requirements, designed by Paul Kieschke. After the medical administrative tasks were transferred back to the Ministry of the Interior in 1910, the name of the ministry changed accordingly. The ministry was renamed again in 1918 after the revolution to the Ministry of Science, Art and Popular Education and, in 1919, took over medical matters from the Ministry of Interior. In the mid-1920s, the ministry included the new medium of radio as part of science, art and popular education; In order to explore the (then not yet so-called) multimedia possibilities, the ministry founded the Broadcasting Experimental Center (German: Rundfunkversuchsstelle) in 1928, which the National Socialists closed shortly after they came to power because of its experimental nature.

=== Post-World War II ===
After the end of World War II, and the founding of the German Democratic Republic, the building on Wilhelmstrasse was rebuilt and used by the Ministry of National Education until the fall of 1989.
