= Duke Charles of Mecklenburg =

German nobleman and Prussian soldier

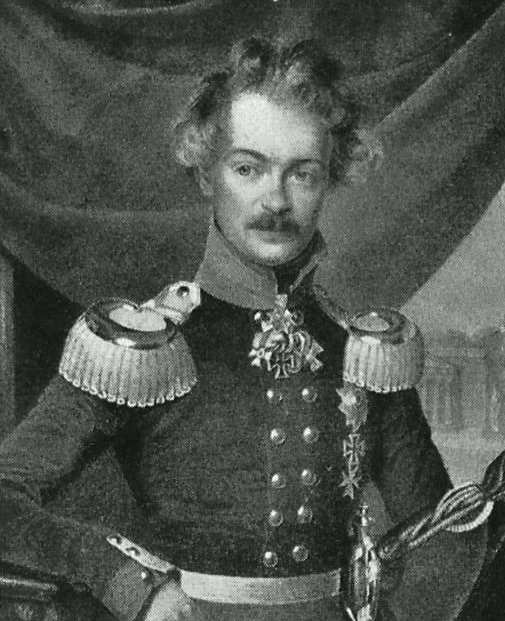
- Born: 30 November 1785; Hanover
- Died: 21 September 1837 (aged 51); Berlin
- Military career
- Allegiance: Kingdom of Prussia
- Branch: Prussian Army
- Rank: Lieutenant General
- Conflicts: Napoleonic Wars
- Awards: Order of the Black Eagle; Iron Cross (1st class)
- Other work: President of the Prussian State Council

Duke Charles of Mecklenburg (German: Karl Friedrich August Herzog zu Mecklenburg; 30 November 1785 – 21 September 1837) was a member of the House of Mecklenburg-Strelitz and a Prussian soldier who served in the Napoleonic Wars. From 1827 until his death he was President of the Prussian State Council.

== Early life and entry into the army ==
Duke Charles Frederick Augustus of Mecklenburg was born in Hanover where his father Duke Charles of Mecklenburg was the governor. His mother was Princess Charlotte of Hesse-Darmstadt, his father's second wife who died shortly after his birth on 12 December. On 2 June 1794 his father succeeded Adolf Friedrich IV as the reigning Duke of Mecklenburg-Strelitz.

Duke Charles entered into the Prussian service at a young age. By the age of 19 he held a commission as a captain and by 1806 he had been promoted to the rank major. He fought for his brother-in-law King Frederick William III of Prussia during the War of the Fourth Coalition accompanying the king in his flight following the Prussian defeat in the Battle of Jena-Auerstedt. For his services in the Saale campaign Duke Charles was awarded the Order of the Black Eagle.

== 1813 ==
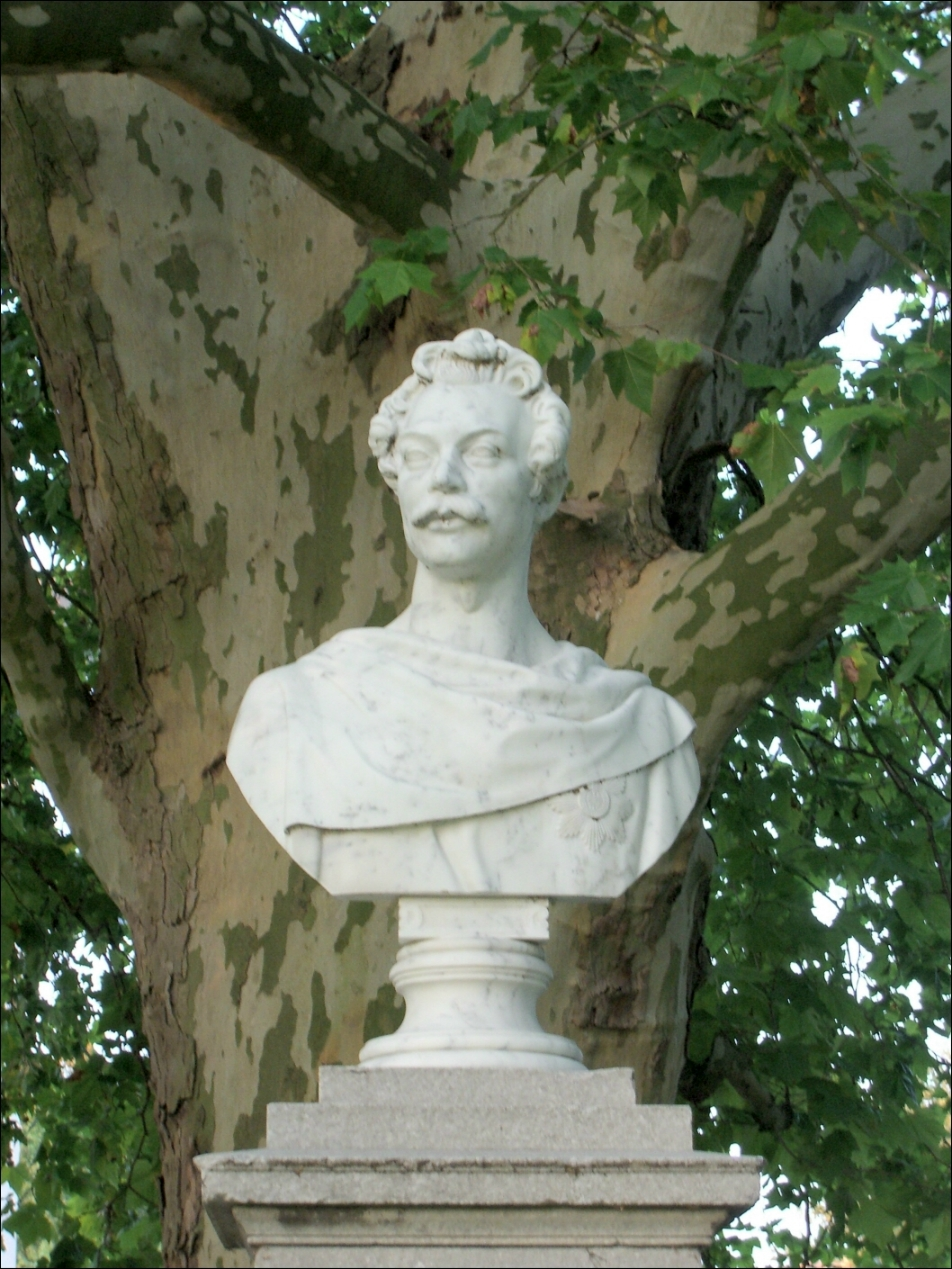
A statue of Duke Charles in Neustrelitz

By 1813 he had been promoted to the rank Major General and was in command of brigade attached to the force of General Ludwig Yorck von Wartenburg. Duke Charles led his brigade at the Battle of Katzbach. During this campaign while commanding a small column he managed to hold off an attack by French forces who had superior numbers for a whole day before being ordered to withdraw during the night. Shortly after this engagement Duke Charles was instructed by Gebhard Leberecht von Blücher to keep open the communication with the forces of Louis Alexandre Andrault de Langeron and Fabian Gottlieb von Osten-Sacken. Shortly after setting out with his brigade he was attacked by three French columns. Although vastly outnumbered he managed to hold his ground until he seized an opportunity and placing himself at the head of one of his battalions he managed to drive the French back. For this achievement he was awarded the Iron Cross 1st Class.

The next action he saw was when the Prussian army crossed the Elbe at Wartenburg on 13 October. Given orders to outflank the right wing of the French, Duke Charles took his brigade across the Elbe and attacked the village of Bleddin and succeeded in driving the French out, taking nine of their cannons and a number of prisoners. On 16 October he fought with distinction at the Battle of Möckern. Leading his brigade in a bayonet charge against the French batteries and columns he succeeded in forcing the section of the line they attacked back but at the cost of his whole brigade almost being taken out with Duke Charles and the other officers all being wounded in the charge.

Later that year Duke Charles was appointed to command the 1st of the Line the oldest regiment of foot in the service.

== Later years ==
In 1815 Duke Charles was appointed a Lieutenant General and Commandant of the Royal Guards and Grenadiers. He was later appointed President of the Prussian State Council in 1827.

Duke Charles never married and died in Berlin on 21 September 1837, at the age of 51.

== Honours ==
He received the following orders and decorations:

- Kingdom of Prussia:
  - Knight of the Black Eagle, 21 July 1810; in Diamonds, 30 November 1827
  - Knight of the Red Eagle, 1st Class
  - Pour le Mérite, with Oak Leaves, 9 October 1813
  - Iron Cross, 1st Class, 1813
  - Knight of the Prussian Order of St. John
- Russian Empire:
  - Knight of St. Vladimir, 2nd Class, 7 October 1813
  - Knight of St. George, 3rd Class, 10 December 1813
  - Knight of St. Andrew, 25 September 1818
  - Knight of St. Alexander Nevsky
  - Knight of St. Anna, 1st Class
- Austrian Empire:
  - Knight of the Military Order of Maria Theresa, 1813
  - Grand Cross of St. Stephen, 1833
- Kingdom of Hanover: Grand Cross of the Royal Guelphic Order, 1820
- Grand Duchy of Hesse: Grand Cross of the Ludwig Order

== Ancestry ==
Ancestors of Duke Charles of Mecklenburg

8. Adolf Frederick II, Duke of Mecklenburg-Strelitz
4. Duke Charles Louis Frederick of Mecklenburg
9. Princess Christiane Emilie of Schwarzburg-Sondershausen
2. Charles II, Grand Duke of Mecklenburg-Strelitz
10. Ernest Frederick I, Duke of Saxe-Hildburghausen
5. Princess Elisabeth Albertine of Saxe-Hildburghausen
11. Countess Sophia Albertine of Erbach-Erbach
1. Duke Charles of Mecklenburg
12. Louis VIII, Landgrave of Hesse-Darmstadt
6. Prince George William of Hesse-Darmstadt
13. Countess Charlotte of Hanau-Lichtenberg
3. Princess Charlotte of Hesse-Darmstadt
14. Count Christian Karl Reinhard of Leiningen-Dachsburg-Falkenburg-Heidesheim
7. Countess Maria Louise Albertine of Leiningen-Falkenburg-Dagsburg
15. Countess Catharine Polyxene of Solms-Rödelheim and Assenheim
