= August von der Heydt =

German economist

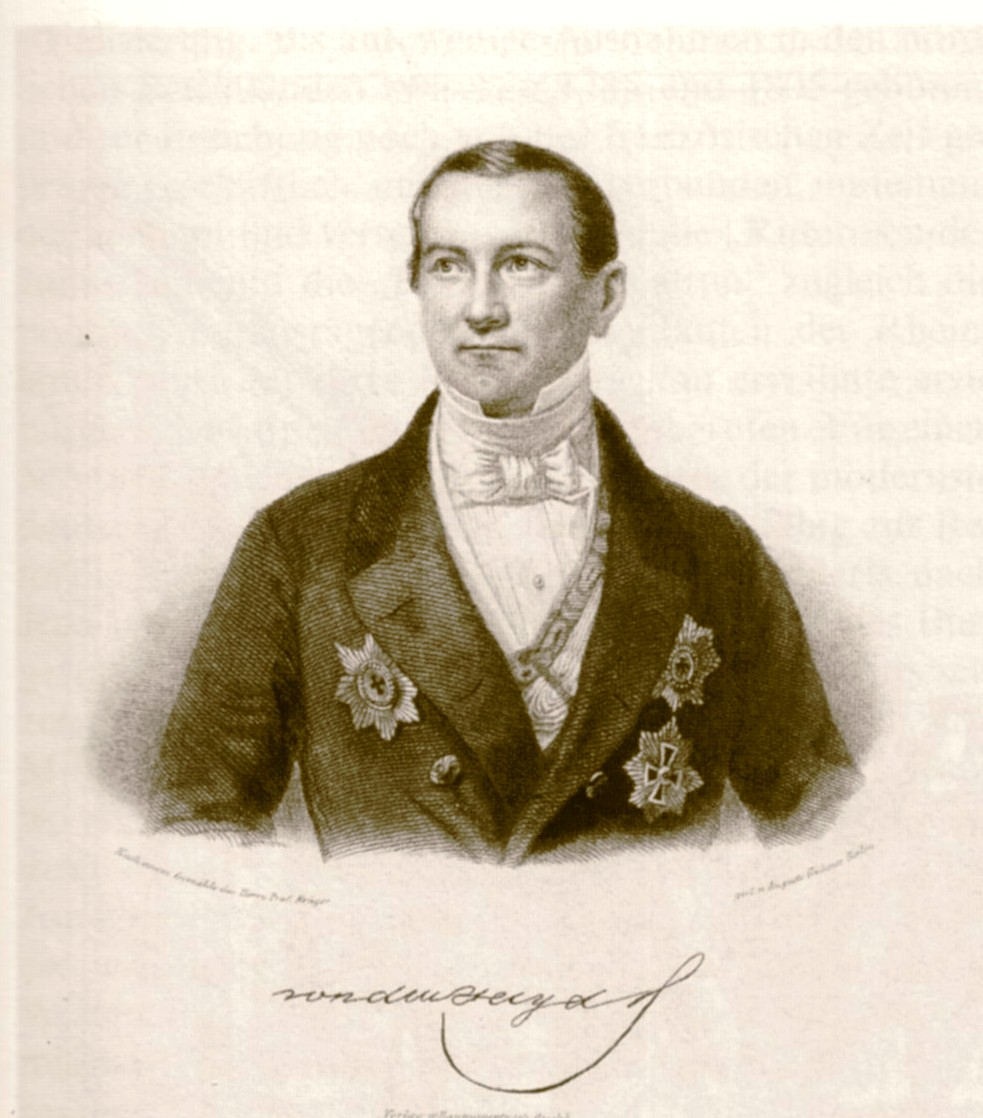
August von der Heydt

August von der Heydt (15 February 1801 – 13 June 1874) was an influential German economist.

== Early life ==
Von der Heydt was born in Elberfeld in the Duchy of Berg.

== Career ==
During the Revolution of 1848 he was appointed as Minister to the newly created Ministry of Commerce and Industry in the Kingdom of Prussia, serving during the reigns of kings Frederick William IV and William I. He helped increase circulation of money at the rate of 12.5%/year.

He was responsible for the railways in Prussia and organized new railroad construction and purchased private ones. He reformed the old mining laws, by lowering the tax on the mining industry, ending state supervision, and eliminated the privileges of the miners guild. He also allowed government to be less restrictive of its attitude toward the formation of banks. The formation of many new banks revolutionized Germany by supplying a lot of much needed capital. In 1862 he resigned his position, but he took it back from 1866 to 1867 to help finance the Austro-Prussian War.

== Personal life ==
Von der Heydt died in Berlin. He is also the great-grandfather of the banker, art collector, and patron Eduard von der Heydt.
