= List of finance ministers of Prussia =

Government official in Prussia

This is a list of finance ministers of Prussia.

== History ==
The Finance Ministry was first established as the Ministry of Administration in 1808 under the Prussian Reform Movement. It later became known as the Finance Ministry in 1848.

== Finance ministers ==
Name	Image	Term start	Term end	Notes
Hans, Count von Bülow	Count von Bülow	1813	1817	
Wilhelm von Klewitz	Wilhelm Anton von Klewiz	1817	1825	
Friedrich von Motz	Friedrich von Motz	1825	1830	
Karl Georg Maaßen		1830	1834	
Albrecht von Alvensleben	Albrecht von Alvensleben	1835	1842	
Ernst von Bodelschwingh		1842	1844	
Eduard Heinrich von Flottwell	Eduard Heinrich von Flottwell	1844	1846	
Franz von Duesberg		1846	1848	
David Hansemann	David Hansemann	1848	1848	
Gustav von Bonin		1848	1848	
Rudolf Rabe		1849	1851	
Carl von Bodelschwingh		1851	1858	
Robert von Patow	Robert von Patow	1858	1862	
August Freiherr von der Heydt	August von der Heydt	1862	1862	
Carl von Bodelschwingh		1862	1866	
August Freiherr von der Heydt	August von der Heydt	1866	1869	
Otto von Camphausen	Otto von Camphausen	1869	1878	
Arthur Hobrecht		1878	1879	
Karl Hermann Bitter		1879	1882	
Adolf von Scholz		1882	1890	
Johannes von Miquel	Johannes von Miquel	1890	1901	
Georg von Rheinbaben		1901	1910	
August Lentze		1910	1917	
Oskar Hergt		1917	1918	
Albert Südekum and Hugo Simon		1918	1919	
Albert Südekum		1919	1920	
Hermann Lüdemann	Hermann Lüdemann	1920	1921	
Friedrich Saemisch	Friedrich Saemisch	1921	1921	
Ernst von Richter		1921	1925	
Otto Braun	Otto Braun	1925	1925	
Hermann Höpker-Aschoff		1925	1931	
Walther Schreiber	Walther Schreiber	1931	1931	
Otto Klepper		1931	1933	
Franz Schleusener		1932	1932	Reichskommissar
Johannes Popitz		1932	1944	Reichskommissar to 1933

== See also ==
- List of interior ministers of Prussia
- List of foreign ministers of Prussia
