= Solz =

Solz may refer to:

- Solz (northern), a river of Hesse, Germany, tributary of the Fulda in Bebra about 15 km downstream of the other Solz
- Solz (southern), a river of Hesse, Germany, tributary of the Fulda in Bad Hersfeld about 15 km upstream of the other Solz
- Trott zu Solz, a Hessian noble family
  - August von Trott zu Solz (1855–1938), German politician, Prussian Minister of Culture
  - Adam von Trott zu Solz (1909–1944), German lawyer and diplomat involved in the resistance to Nazism, husband of Clarita
  - Clarita von Trott zu Solz (1917–2013), was a German medical doctor and psychotherapist, wife of Adam
- Wolfgang Solz (1940–2017), German football winger
