= Helmut von Verschuer =

German civil servant (1926–2024)

Helmut Freiherr von Verschuer
- Born: 6 December 1926; Tübingen, Germany
- Died: 15 March 2024 (aged 97)
- Other name: Helmut van Verschuer
- Occupation: Civil servant
- Years active: 1958-1987
- Employer: European Commission
- Known for: Europeanization of the agriculture policy
- Notable work: Book: Wie Ich mit 6 Jahren das Ende des Krieges erlebte, Book: Mein Heft

Helmut Freiherr von Verschuer (6 December 1926 – 15 March 2024), sometimes referred to as Helmut van Verschuer in Dutch, was a German civil servant who was a high-ranking official of the European Commission from 1958 until 1987. He was born in Tübingen.

A member of the noble Dutch Verschuer family, which was closely connected to the Trott zu Solz family, Verschuer attended the Musterschule in Frankfurt. He then studied agriculture at the Technical University of Munich and the University of Giessen, and earned an M.Sc. in agriculture in 1950 and a PhD in agriculture at the University of Göttingen in 1956. He was a civil servant in the Federal Ministry of Food and Agriculture in West Germany from 1952 to 1958. He was also a member of the West German permanent delegation to the negotiations on a European agricultural union 1952–1954 and participated in the Val Duchesse negotiations on the Rome Treaties, their compatibility with the GATT, and the free-trade area (1956–1958).

From 1958 to 1987 he worked for the European Commission's Directorate-General for Agriculture. He was the executive assistant (i.e. private secretary) for the first director-general for agriculture Louis-Georges Rabot from 1958 to 1967, Director of General Affairs responsible for international negotiations from 1967 to 1972, and Deputy Director-General from 1972 to 1986. He played a key role in the EU's membership negotiations with Spain and Portugal. He was also President of the Association œcuménique européenne pour église et société in Brussels. He was also the author of several works on the Common Agricultural Policy.

Von Verschuer died on 15 March 2024, at the age of 97.

== Publications ==
- Helmut von Verschuer, Wie ich zur Landwirtschaft kam und die Entstehung der europäischen Agrarpolitik erlebt habe, memoirs, Historical Archives of the European Union, 2014

== See also ==
- His father: Otmar Freiherr von Verschuer
