= Michaelis cabinet (Prussia) =

- Cabinet of the Kingdom of Prussia
- 1917–1917
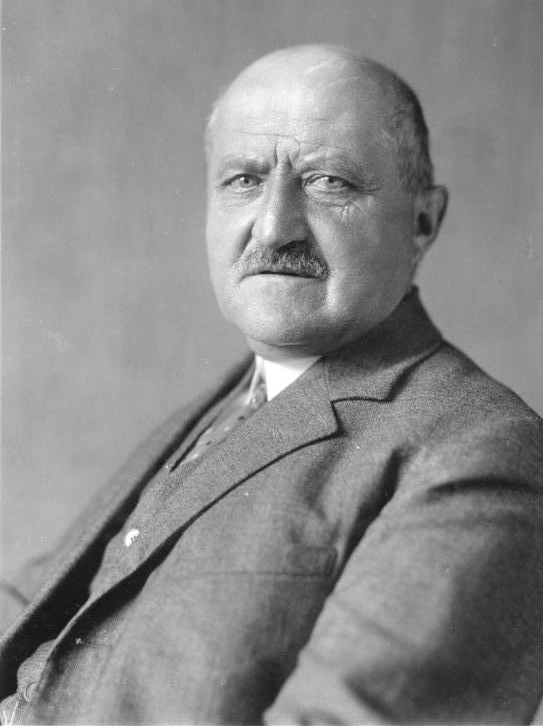
- Minister President Michaelis
- Date formed: July 14, 1917
- Date dissolved: November 1, 1917 (3 months, 2 weeks and 4 days)

People and organisations
- King: William II
- Minister President: Georg Michaelis
- Deputy Prime Minister: Paul von Breitenbach

History
- Predecessor: Bethmann Hollweg cabinet
- Successor: Hertling cabinet

The Michaelis cabinet formed the Prussian State Ministry appointed by King William II from July 14, 1917, to November 1, 1917. Shortly after taking office, a major cabinet reshuffle took place on August 6, 1917.

== Cabinet members ==
Portfolio	Minister	Took office	Left office	Party
Minister President	Georg Michaelis	July 14, 1917	November 1, 1917	N/A
Deputy Prime Minister	Paul von Breitenbach	July 14, 1917	November 1, 1917	N/A
Minister of Foreign Affairs	Theobald von Bethmann Hollweg	July 14, 1917	November 1, 1917	N/A
Minister of Finance	August Lentze	July 14, 1917	August 6, 1917	N/A
Minister of Finance	Oskar Hergt	August 6, 1917	November 1, 1917	DRP
Minister of Spiritual, Educational and Medical Affairs	August von Trott zu Solz	July 14, 1917	August 6, 1917	N/A
Minister of Spiritual, Educational and Medical Affairs	Friedrich Schmidt-Ott	August 6, 1917	November 1, 1917	N/A
Minister of Justice	Max von Beseler	July 14, 1917	August 6, 1917	N/A
Minister of Justice	Peter Spahn	August 6, 1917	November 1, 1917	Centre
Minister of Trade and Commerce	Reinhold von Sydow	July 14, 1917	November 1, 1917	N/A
Minister of Public Works	Paul von Breitenbach	July 14, 1917	November 1, 1917	N/A
Minister of Interior Affairs	Friedrich Wilhelm von Loebell	July 14, 1917	August 6, 1917	N/A
Minister of Interior Affairs	Bill Drews	August 6, 1917	November 1, 1917	N/A
Minister of War	Hermann von Stein	July 14, 1917	November 1, 1917	N/A
Minister of Agriculture, Domains and Forestry	Clemens von Schorlemer-Lieser	July 14, 1917	August 6, 1917	N/A
Minister of Agriculture, Domains and Forestry	Paul von Eisenhart-Rothe	August 6, 1917	November 1, 1917	N/A

== See also ==
- Prussian State Ministry
