= Otmar Freiherr von Verschuer =

German biologist, National Socialist, and geneticist (1896–1969)

- Otmar von Verschuer (rear) supervises the measurement of two men's heads as part of an anthropometric study of heredity.
- Born: 16 July 1896; Wildeck, German Empire
- Died: 8 August 1969 (aged 73); Münster, West Germany
- Scientific career
- Fields: Human biology, human genetics
- Workplaces: Kaiser Wilhelm Institute of Anthropology, Human Heredity, and Eugenics, University of Münster

Otmar Freiherr von Verschuer (Dutch: [veɐˈʃyə]; 16 July 1896 – 8 August 1969) was a German human biologist, geneticist, and Nazi-affiliated eugenicist, who was the Professor of Human Genetics at the University of Münster until he retired in 1965. A member of the Verschuer family, his title Freiherr is often translated as baron.

He was regarded as a pioneer in the twin methodology of genetics research and in the study of the inheritance of diseases and anomalies. He had great interest in racial hygiene and was an advocate of compulsory sterilization programs in the first half of the 20th century while working with the Nazis. Among his many students was Josef Mengele, a war criminal who directed medical experiments at Auschwitz.

He successfully redefined himself as a geneticist in the postwar era. During the 1950s and 1960s, he was known for research on the effects of nuclear radiation on humans and for his warnings against the possibility of creating "scientifically improved" human beings offered by genetic science.

Verschuer was the director of the Institute for Genetic Biology and Racial Hygiene from 1935 to 1942 and director of the Kaiser Wilhelm Institute of Anthropology, Human Heredity, and Eugenics (KWI-A) from 1942 to 1948. From 1951 to 1965, he was Professor of Human Genetics at the University of Münster, where he also served as Dean of the Faculty of Medicine. At Münster, he established one of the largest centers of genetics research in West Germany, and remained one of the world's most prominent genetics researchers until his death. He became Professor Emeritus in 1965; he received numerous memberships in learned societies. In 1952 he was elected President of the German Anthropological Association. His son Helmut von Verschuer was a high-ranking official of the European Commission.

== Family ==
Otmar von Verschuer was born into a noble family. From birth he held the title of Freiherr (baron), a title that had been granted to several family branches by the Holy Roman Emperor, the Dutch king, and the elector of Hesse. He was mainly of Dutch, German, Estonian/Baltic German, and Swedish descent, and had distant Scottish ancestry. His father Hans von Verschuer was a businessman who owned a mining company, while his mother Charlotte née von Arnold was originally from Estonia; her family was ennobled in Russia in the mid-19th century and was partially resident in Sweden. He was a descendant of the House of Stuart through his 6th great grandmother Brita Stuart, a Swedish noblewoman of Scottish royal descent.

Otmar von Verschuer was the father of Helmut Freiherr von Verschuer (also known as Helmut van Verschuer), a high-ranking official of the European Commission, and the grandfather of the Belgian-German actor, Leopold Freiherr von Verschuer (born 1961 in Brussels).

== Early career ==
Verschuer served in the First World War and had been promoted to first lieutenant by 1918. From 1919, he studied medicine at Marburg University. He obtained a doctorate in medicine at the Ludwig-Maximilians-Universität München in 1923 and a habilitation at the University of Tübingen in 1927. In 1927, he became head of department for human genetics at the Kaiser Wilhelm Institute of Anthropology, Human Heredity, and Eugenics. He left that post in 1935 to join the Institute for Hereditary Biology and Racial Hygiene in Frankfurt.

== Nazi era ==
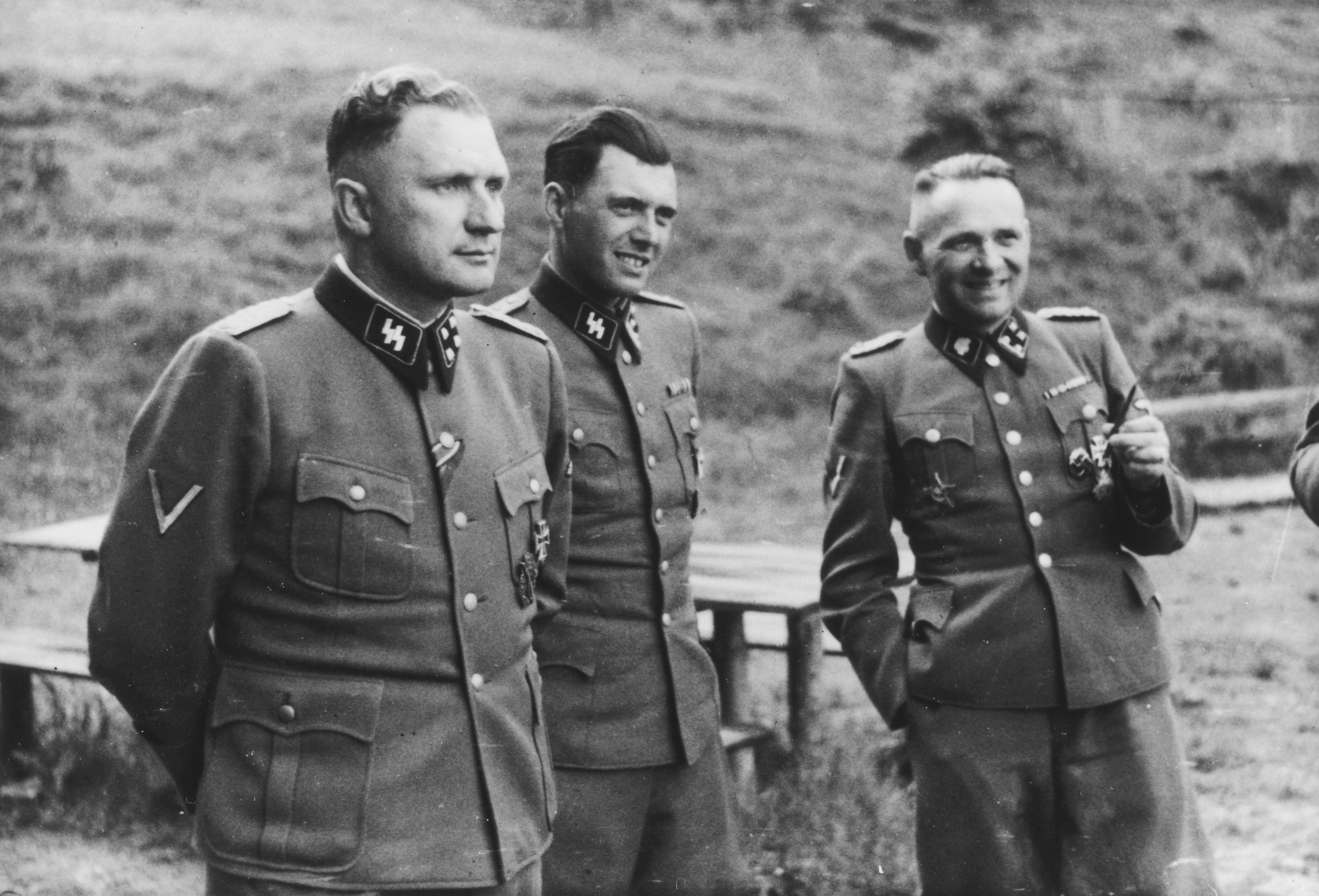
Richard Baer, Josef Mengele and Rudolf Höss at Auschwitz, 1944. Höcker Album

In 1935, Verschuer became a member of the congregation of the anti-Nazi pastor Otto Fricke, a leading member of the Confessing Church. He also maintained a close friendship with his relative, Adam von Trott zu Solz, a leading resistance figure. He joined the Nazi Party in 1940, although he was not actively involved with politics. He admired Adolf Hitler, especially Hitler's views on racial hygiene and biological heredity.

In the late stages of the Second World War, Verschuer directly or indirectly started to use research material obtained in the Auschwitz concentration camp, mainly through his former student Josef Mengele, who served there as a camp physician.

Verschuer was never tried for crimes against humanity despite many indications that not only was he fully cognisant of Mengele's work at Auschwitz, but even encouraged and collaborated with Mengele. In a report to the German Research Council (Deutsche Forschungsgemeinschaft; DFG) from 1944, Verschuer talked about Mengele's assistance in supplying the KWI-A with some "scientific materials" from Auschwitz:

My assistant, Dr. Mengele (M.D., Ph.D.) has joined me in this branch of research. He is presently employed as Hauptsturmführer and camp physician in the concentration camp at Auschwitz. Anthropological investigations on the most diverse racial groups of this concentration camp are being carried out with permission of the SS Reichsführer [Himmler]; the blood samples are being sent to my laboratory for analysis.

Verschuer wrote in the report that the war conditions had made it difficult for the KWI-A to procure "twin materials" for study, and that Mengele's unique position at Auschwitz offered a special opportunity in this respect. In the summer of 1944, Mengele and his Jewish slave assistant Dr. Miklós Nyiszli sent other "scientific materials" to the KWI-A, including the bodies of murdered Roma, internal organs of dead children, skeletons of two murdered Jews, and blood samples of twins infected by Mengele with typhus.

He was accepted during the war as a member of the American Eugenics Society, a position he kept until his death.

== Post-war career ==
As the war was drawing to a close in 1945, Verschuer moved the files of the KWI-A into the Western part of Germany, hoping for a more favorable response from the advancing Allied armies than from the advancing Soviet Army. In late 1945 or early 1946, he petitioned the mayor of Frankfurt to allow him to reestablish the KWI-A. However, the commission in charge of rebuilding the Kaiser Wilhelm Gesellschaft decreed that "Verschuer should not be considered as a collaborator, but as one of the most dangerous Nazi activists of the Third Reich." The KWI-A was not reestablished.

In 1951, Verschuer was awarded the prestigious professorship of human genetics at the University of Münster, where he established one of the largest centers of genetics research in West Germany. Like many "racial hygienists" of the Nazi period, and many American eugenicists, Verschuer was successful in redefining himself as a genetics researcher after the war, and avoided the taint of his work with Nazi eugenics. Many of his wartime students were similarly appointed to top positions at the University of Erlangen, Goethe University Frankfurt, Heinrich Heine University Düsseldorf, and the University of Münster.

In his denazification hearing, Verschuer was deemed to be a Nazi fellow traveler (Mitläufer, a relatively mild categorization meaning someone who was neither a supporter or member of the regime nor an active opponent), and fined 600 ℛ︁ℳ︁. He was never prosecuted for his research activities during the war. Leo Alexander who investigated the case concluded that no solid evidence could be found, and considered it likely that Verschuer had destroyed any possibly incriminating material.

During the 1950s and 1960s, Verschuer led major research projects on the effects of nuclear radiation on humans. Deeply religious, he also concerned himself with questions of Christian ethics, and argued that eugenics must be based on human dignity and love for mankind; according to historian Sheila F. Weiss he "turned his back on" Nazi beliefs. In the 1960s he warned against human geneticists trying to create "scientifically improved" human beings. But he was among the founders of The Mankind Quarterly, a journal promoting scientific racism.

Verschuer died in a car accident in 1969.

== Honours ==
- 1934: Fellow of the Academy of Sciences Leopoldina
- 1943: Fellow of the Prussian Academy of Sciences
- 1949: Fellow of the Akademie der Wissenschaften und der Literatur
- 1949: Corresponding member of the American Society of Human Genetics
- 1953: Honorary member of the Italian Society of Medical Genetics
- 1955: Honorary member of the Anthropological Society of Vienna
- 1956: Honorary member of the Japanese Society of Human Genetics
- 1959: Corresponding member of the Austrian Academy of Sciences

== Bibliography ==
- Erbpathologie (Hereditary pathology, 1934).
- Erbbiologie als Unterlage der Bevölkerungspolitik (Hereditary biology as a basis for the population policy). First published in 1933, re-published and modified in 1936.
- Rassenhygiene als Wissenschaft und Staatsaufgabe (Racial hygiene as Science and State function, 1936).
- Leitfaden der Rassenhygiene (Textbook of Racial hygiene, 1944).
- Eugenik. Kommende Generationen in der Sicht der Genetik (Eugenics: Coming Generations in the view of Genetics, 1966).

== See also ==
- Nazi eugenics
- Heinrich Gross

== Other sources ==
- Degen, Peter. "Racial Hygienist Otmar von Verschuer, the Confessing Church, and comparative reflections on postwar rehabilitation," pp. 155–65 in Jing Bao Nie, Japan´s Medical Wartime Atrocities (London: Routledge&Kegan, 2010)
- Ehrenreich, Eric. "Otmar von Verschuer and the 'Scientific' Legitimization of Nazi Anti-Jewish Policy," Holocaust and Genocide Studies 2007 21(1):55–72
- Marwell, David G. (2020). Mengele: Unmasking the "Angel of Death". New York: W. W. Norton & Company. ISBN 978-0-393-60953-0.
- Proctor, Robert N. Racial Hygiene: Medicine under the Nazis, Cambridge, MA: Harvard University Press, 1988.
- Westermann, Stefanie; Kühl, Richard; Gross, Dominik, eds. (2009), Medizin und Nationalsozialismus vol. 1: Medizin im Dienst der "Erbgesundheit: Beiträge zur Geschichte der Eugenik und "Rassenhygiene" (English: Medicine and National Socialism, Vol. 1: Medicine at work, the "hereditary health": Contribution to history of Eugenics and "race hygiene"), LIT Verlag Münster, ISBN 978-3643104786
- Weigmann, Katrin. "In the name of science. The role of biologists in Nazi atrocities: lessons for today's scientists" in EMBO Reports v.2 #10 (2001), 871–875.
- Weindling, Paul. "'Tales from Nuremberg': The Kaiser Wilhelm Institute for Anthropology and Allied medical war crimes policy," in Geschichte der Kaiser-Wilhelm-Gesellschaft im Nationalsozialismus: Bestandaufnahme und Perspektiven der Forschung, ed. Doris Kaufmann, v.2 (Goettingen: Wallstein, 2000), 635–652.
- Weiss, Sheila Faith. After the Fall. Political Whitewashing, Professional Posturing, and personal Refashioning in the Postwar Career of Otmar Freiherr von Verschuer. Isis, Vol. 101 (2010), 722–758.
