= Bethmann Hollweg cabinet (Prussia) =

- Cabinet of the Kingdom of Prussia
- 1909–1917
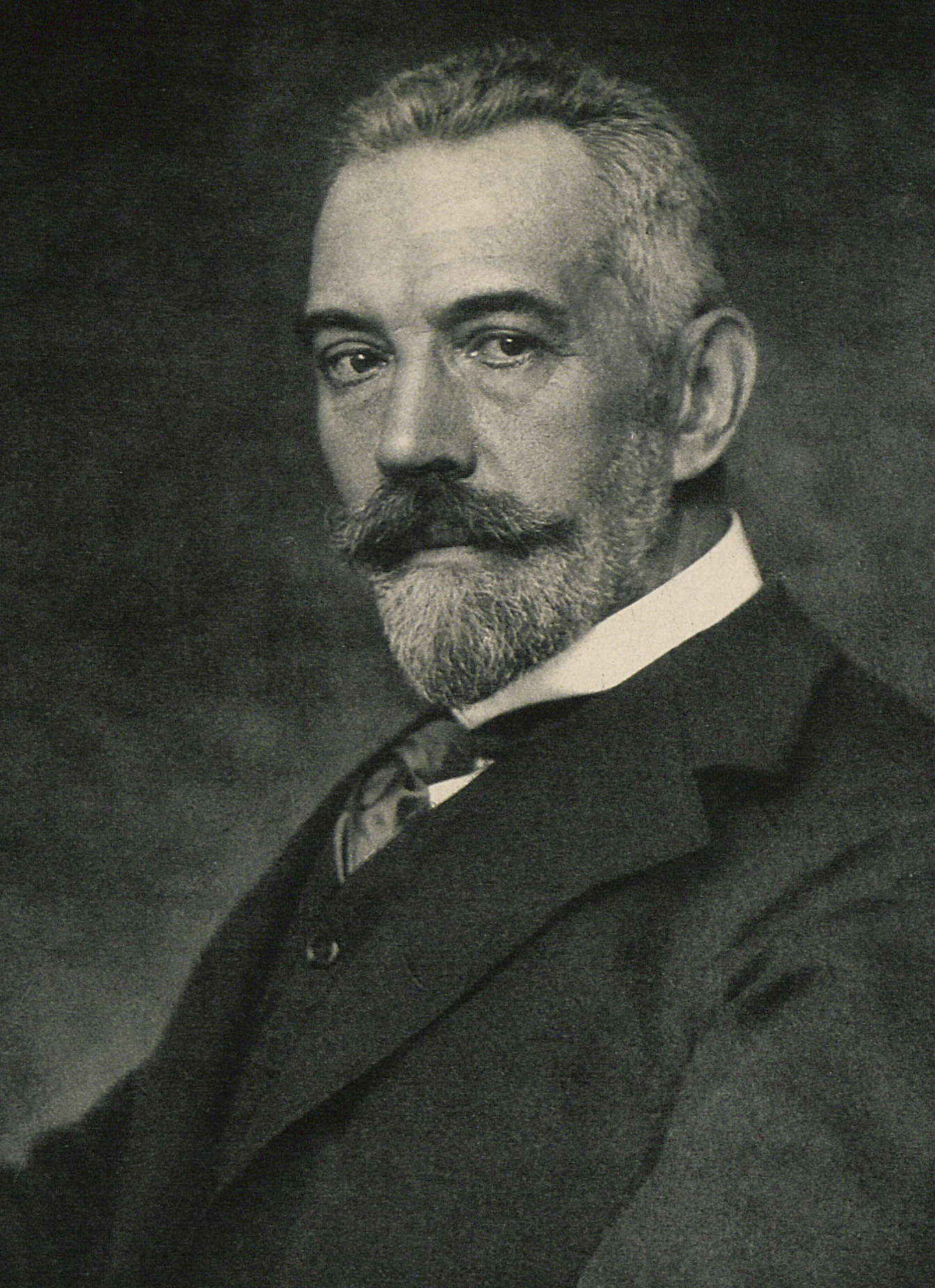
- Minister President Bethmann Hollweg
- Date formed: July 14, 1909
- Date dissolved: July 14, 1917 (8 years)

People and organisations
- King: William II
- Minister President: Theobald von Bethmann Hollweg
- Deputy Prime Minister: Clemens von Delbrück; Paul von Breitenbach

History
- Predecessor: Bülow cabinet
- Successor: Michaelis cabinet

The Bethmann Hollweg cabinet formed the Prussian State Ministry appointed by King William II from July 14, 1909, to July 14, 1917.

== Cabinet members ==
Portfolio	Minister	Took office	Left office	Party
Minister President	Theobald von Bethmann Hollweg	July 14, 1909	July 14, 1917	N/A
Deputy Prime Minister	Clemens von Delbrück	August 16, 1914	May 22, 1916	N/A
Deputy Prime Minister	Paul von Breitenbach	May 22, 1916	July 14, 1917	N/A
Minister of Foreign Affairs	Theobald von Bethmann Hollweg	July 14, 1909	July 14, 1917	N/A
Minister of Finance	Georg von Rheinbaben	July 14, 1909	June 27, 1910	N/A
Minister of Finance	August Lentze	June 27, 1910	July 14, 1917	N/A
Minister of Spiritual, Educational and Medical Affairs	August von Trott zu Solz	July 14, 1909	July 14, 1917	N/A
Minister of Justice	Max von Beseler	July 14, 1909	July 14, 1917	N/A
Minister of Trade and Commerce	Reinhold von Sydow	July 14, 1909	July 14, 1917	N/A
Minister of Public Works	Paul von Breitenbach	July 14, 1909	July 14, 1917	N/A
Minister of Interior Affairs	Friedrich von Moltke	July 14, 1909	June 18, 1910	N/A
Minister of Interior Affairs	Johann von Dallwitz	June 18, 1910	April 18, 1914	DKP
Minister of Interior Affairs	Friedrich Wilhelm von Loebell	May 1, 1914	July 14, 1917	N/A
Minister of War	Karl von Einem	July 14, 1909	August 11, 1909	N/A
Minister of War	Josias von Heeringen	August 11, 1909	July 4, 1913	N/A
Minister of War	Erich von Falkenhayn	July 7, 1913	January 19, 1915	N/A
Minister of War	Adolf Wild von Hohenborn	January 20, 1915	October 29, 1916	N/A
Minister of War	Hermann von Stein	October 29, 1916	July 14, 1917	N/A
Minister of Agriculture, Domains and Forestry	Bernd von Arnim	July 14, 1909	June 18, 1910	N/A
Minister of Agriculture, Domains and Forestry	Clemens von Schorlemer-Lieser	June 18, 1910	July 14, 1917	N/A

== See also ==
- Prussian State Ministry
