= Rabot =

Rabot may refer to:

== Geography ==
- Rabot, Tajikistan, a city in Tajikistan
- Rabot Island, island near Antarctica
- Rabot Glacier, glacier in Antarctica
- Rabot Point, a high rocky point in James Ross Island, Antarctica

== People with the surname ==
- Charles Rabot (1856-1944), French geographer and glaciologist
- Iris Rabot (born 2000), French footballer
- Louis-Georges Rabot (1913–1978), French and European civil servant
- Pierre Rabot (born 1865, date of death unknown), French sailor
