= Verschuer =

Dutch noble family

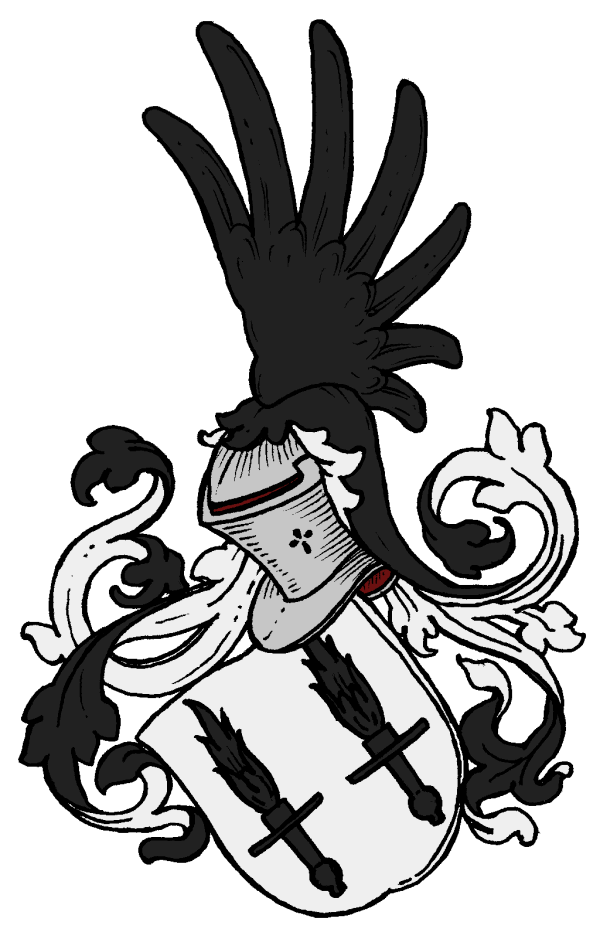
Coat of arms of the family

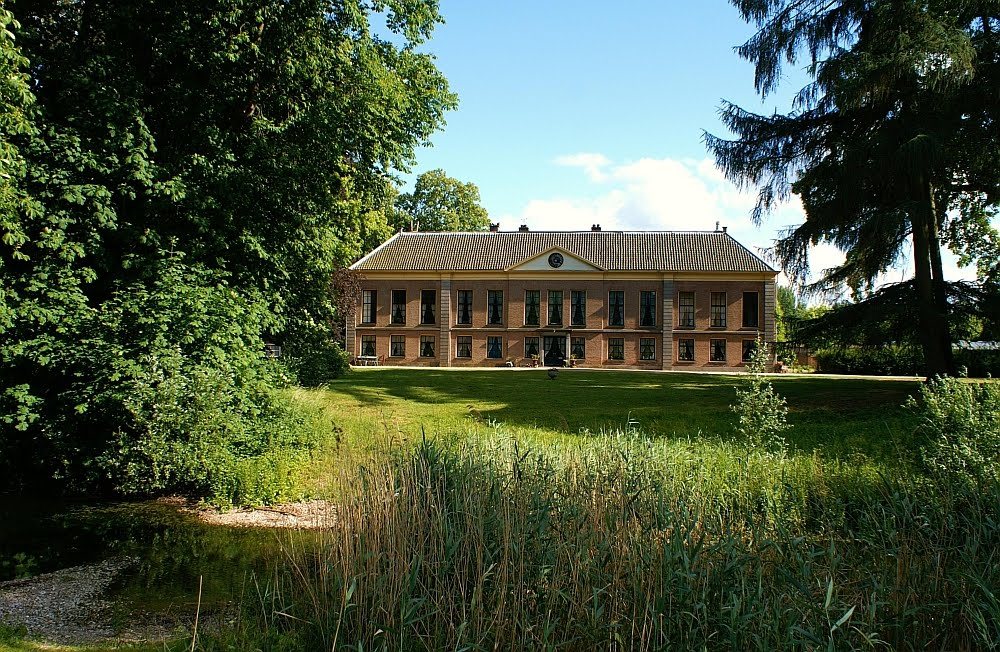
Mariënwaerdt, a family manor house in Gelderland in The Netherlands

The Verschuer family (originally van der Schuer) is a Dutch noble family originally from Appelrebroeck near Barneveld in Gelderland. The family has branches in The Netherlands and Germany. The family name is spelled van Verschuer in Dutch and von Verschuer in German.

The family can be traced back to Gaert Clasz (born 1490), who married Margriet van der Schuer, the widow of Brant van der Schuer. Gaert died after 1549, and his sons adopted the family name van der Schuer. In the late 17th century Otto Christoph van Verschuer (1650–1712) was the sole living male member of the family, and the current family is descended from him. He was a Dutch colonel and later a general in the service of Hesse-Kassel, and received the title of baron from the Holy Roman Emperor in 1696.

Otto Christoph van Verschuer was the father of Wolff Dietrich van (von) Verschuer (1676–1737), who became a Swedish general and who has descendants who belonged to the Hessian nobility, and Philip Willem van Verschuer (Philipp Wilhelm von Verschuer), who became a Dutch brigadier and who has numerous prominent descendants in The Netherlands. The Hessian family branch were recognised as barons of the Electorate of Hesse in 1839. Bernard van Verschuer, a Dutch colonel and a member of the Dutch branch, was recognised as noble in The Netherlands in 1816 and granted the Dutch baronial title in 1820.

== Notable family members ==
- Helmut von Verschuer (1926–2024), German European Commission official
- Otmar Freiherr von Verschuer (1896–1969), German human biologist and geneticist
- Otto van Verschuer (1927–2014), Dutch politician
- Otto Christoph van Verschuer (1650–1712), Dutch military officer and ancestor of all extant family branches
- Wolff Dietrich von Verschuer (1676–1737), Swedish general and ancestor of the Hessian branch
- Philip Willem van Verschuer (1678–1735), Dutch brigadier and ancestor of the extant Dutch branch
