= Gereon Goldmann =

German priest (1916–2003)

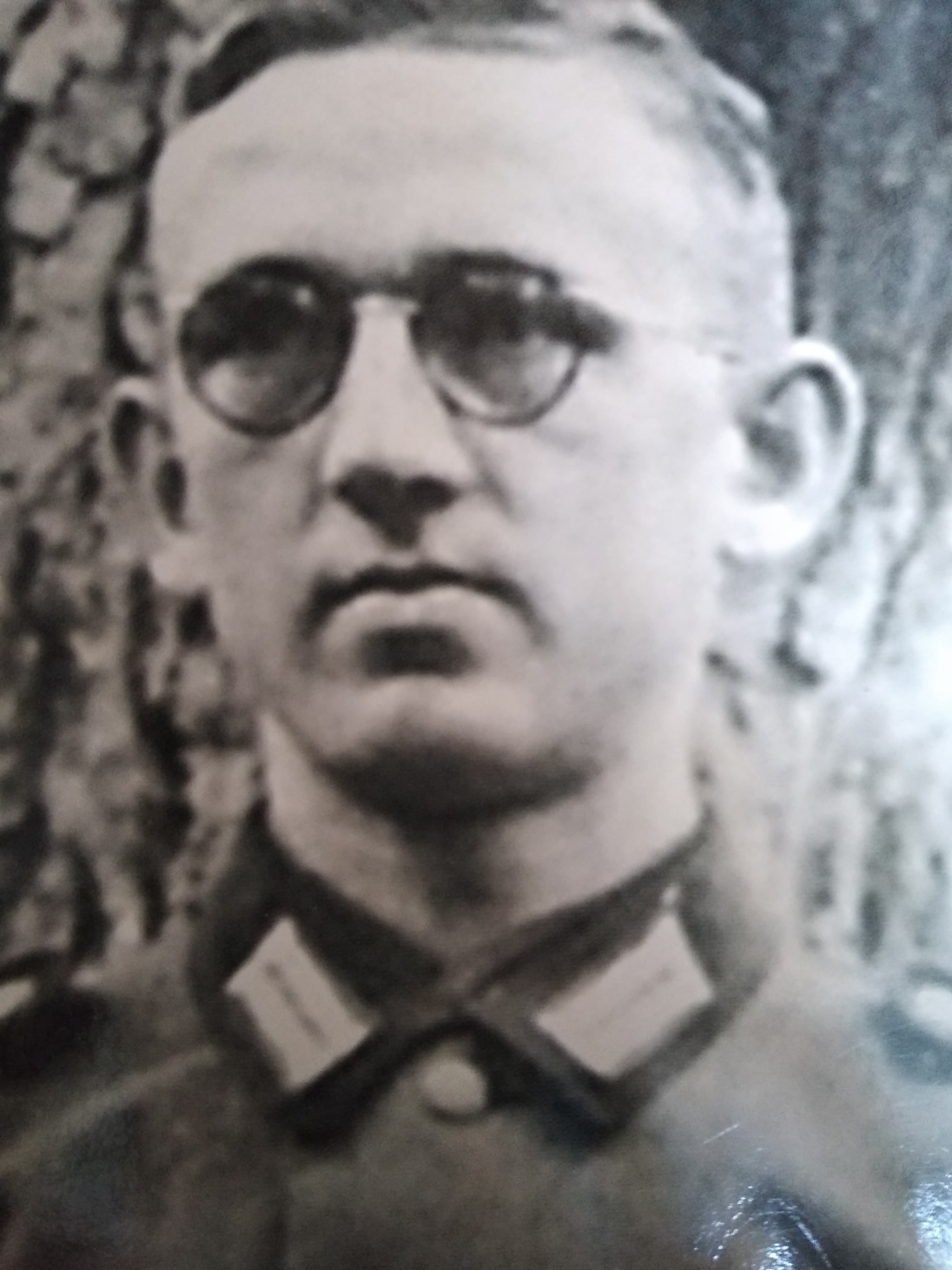
Gereon Goldmann

Gereon Karl Goldmann, OFM (25 October 1916 – 26 July 2003) was a German Franciscan priest, a World War II veteran of the Wehrmacht and Waffen SS, and a member of the German Resistance against Adolf Hitler.

== Early life ==
Gereon Karl Goldmann was born on 10 October 1916 in Ziegenhain (now part of Schwalmstadt, Hesse) as one of seven children of Karl Goldmann, a veterinarian, and his wife, Margarethe. After his wife's death in 1924, Karl Goldmann remarried, and the family moved to Cologne. There, Gereon Goldmann joined the Bund Neudeutschland, a Catholic youth association run by the Jesuits. The group spent time doing charitable works in the city and countryside. Often, they were engaged in vicious street battles against the Hitler Youth group. Goldmann entered a Franciscan seminary in October 1936.

== Military career ==
Goldmann was drafted into the Wehrmacht following the completion of his seminary education in philosophy. When World War II began, he was transferred to a Waffen SS training unit in occupied Poland. In his memoirs, he vividly describes the anti-Christianity rampant in the Waffen SS and the brutal hazing wreaked on his fellow Catholic recruits. After performing outstandingly in officer's training Goldmann was offered a position as an officer, on the condition that he abandons his faith and vocation. Goldmann refused and was scorned by his superiors. In response he sent a protest directly to the SS chief, Heinrich Himmler, and in early 1942, he was transferred back to the Wehrmacht in disgrace. He spoke openly of his hatred for Nazism, and September 1942, he was charged with high treason. He had a court martial in Kassel but was acquitted and so he escaped the death penalty.

He was then transferred to the Eastern Front. Goldmann was soon arrested again and spent the winter of 1943 in prison. He was then sent to occupied France and later to Sicily.

== German resistance ==
On a home leave in Germany, he was approached by Adam von Trott zu Solz, a career diplomat and a member of the Kreisau Circle. To Goldmann's horror, von Trott zu Solz identified himself as a member of a secret organization formed to assassinate Hitler and dismantle Nazi Germany. In a deliberate attempt to recruit him, von Trott zu Solz told Goldmann, "You can help us to save Germany from its disgrace." The jurist informed Goldmann that his acquittal by the court-martial was caused by the influence of the German resistance.

Goldmann responded that he had taken the soldier's oath and could not, as a Christian, go back on his word. Von Trott zu Solz responded, "I am also a Christian, as are those who are with me. We have prayed before the crucifix and have agreed that since we are Christians, we cannot violate the allegiance we owe God. We must therefore break our word given to him who has broken so many agreements and still is doing it. If only you knew what I know, Goldmann! There is no other way! Since we are Germans and Christians we must act, and if not soon, then it will be too late. Think it over till tonight."

The next day, Goldmann informed von Trott zu Solz that his terms were acceptable. He then joined the 20 July Plot as a carrier of secret dispatches. One such assignment led him to Rome in January 1944. Baron Ernst von Weizsäcker, the German Ambassador to the Vatican, was sympathetic to the Resistance and arranged an audience for Goldmann with Pope Pius XII. The Pope granted Goldmann special dispensation to be ordained to the priesthood without the customary three years of theology studies.

== Prisoner of war ==
Goldmann was captured by the British Army following the Battle of Monte Cassino, and sent to Birkhadem Algeria for interrogation. After his investigation was complete he chose to be sent to a POW seminary near Rivet. On 24 June 1944, he was ordained a priest by the archbishop of Algiers in the camp chapel. From August 1944 until the end of 1945, he served as a chaplain in a camp at Ksar es Souk, Morocco. According to Goldmann's memoirs, many of the inmates at Ksar es Souk remained convinced Nazis and therefore regarded their chaplain as a traitor. They falsely accused him of being the former commandant of Dachau concentration camp, alleging that he had attempted to escape prosecution by becoming a priest.

The French authorities believed this accusation and arrested Goldmann at the end of 1945. At Meknes he was court-martialed by the French Army, and sentenced to death by firing squad. In February 1946, just before the scheduled execution, Pope Pius XII and several others interceded on Goldmann's behalf, declaring that the charges were false. As a result, Goldmann's execution was delayed and eventually his conviction was overturned.

== Post-war life ==
After his release in 1947 he returned to Fulda. He was once more arrested for war crimes by the United States Army in 1948, but the charges were dropped in 1949 after he revealed his involvement in the 20 July Plot. He studied theology for a year before turning to work with youth.

=== Missionary ===
In early 1954, Goldmann went to Japan to head the parish of St Elizabeth in the poverty-ridden Itabashi district of Tokyo. Between 1954 and 1961, he turned to ragpicking to sustain his parish, but eventually collected enough money to establish a foundation for education. He built two churches, numerous houses, hospitals, a holiday centre for families, and a community centre. For his efforts, in 1965 he was honoured by Emperor Hirohito and business executive Tadashi Adachi with the Order of Good Deeds, the highest award bestowed by the state for social work. In 1975, he founded the St. Gregory Institute for Church Music and Liturgy in Tokyo. He continued his charitable works in Japan and eventually extended these to India as well, spending almost 30 years working with the Carmelites in Kerala.

== Later life and death ==
In poor health, precipitated by a chronic heart condition, Goldmann returned to Germany in 1994, where he remained until his death. Fr. Goldmann died on 26 July 2003 at the Franciscan monastery in Fulda, aged 86.

== Honours ==
- Order of Merit of the Federal Republic of Germany ("Bundesverdienstkreuz 1. Klasse")

== Sources ==
- Goldmann, Gereon (1964), The Shadow of His Wings, Franciscan Herald Press (This Autobiography was republished by Ignatius Press in 2000 with an appendix describing Goldmann's later work in Japan.)
- Seitz, Joseph (1971), Against the Current. Thrilling Experiences of the Rag Picker of Tokyo, Father Gereon Goldman, Savannah: Sister of St. Francis.
