= Solz (northern) =

River in Hesse, Germany

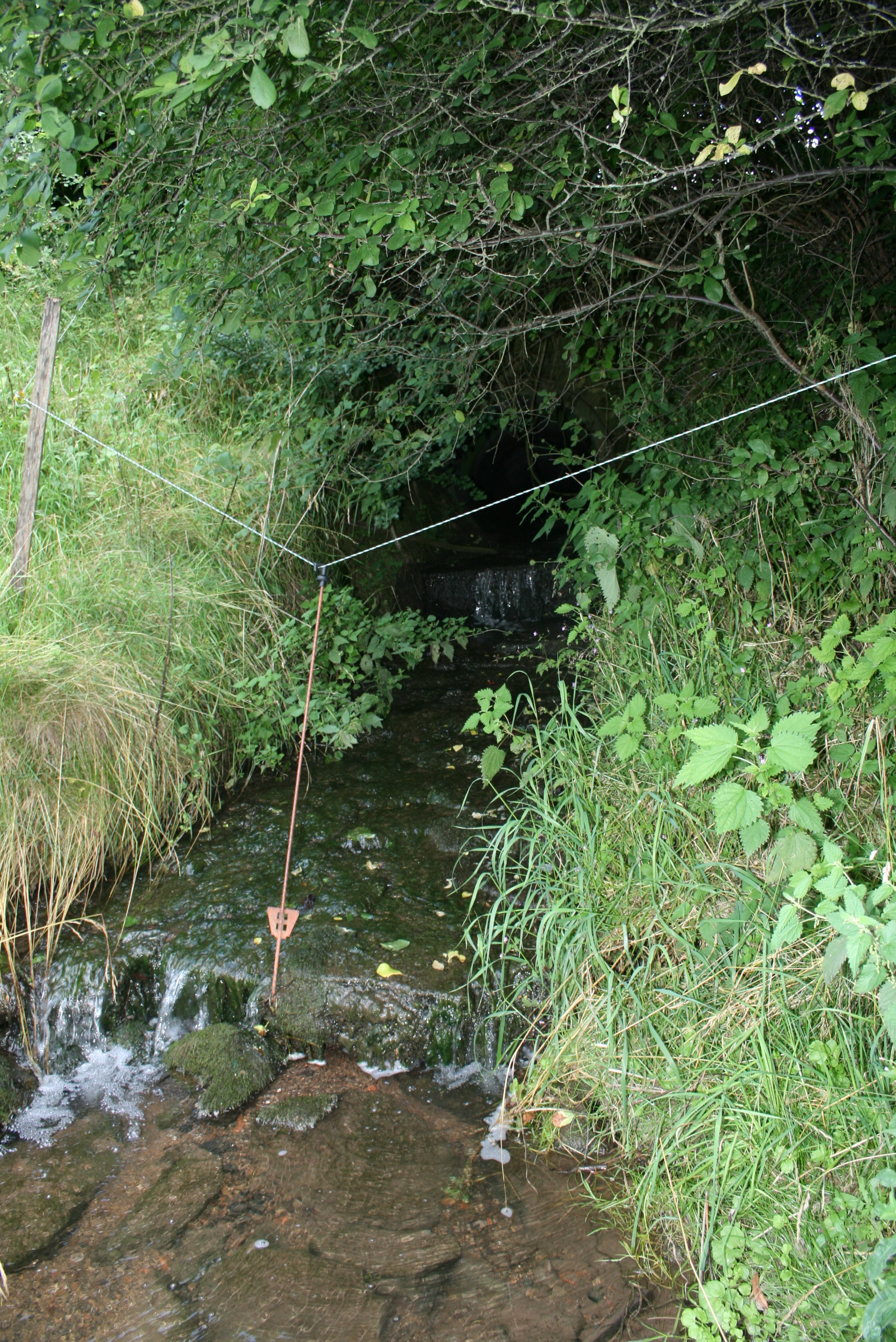

Location
- Country: Germany
- State: Hesse

Physical characteristics
- Mouth
  - location: Fulda
  - coordinates: 50.9624°N 9.7787°E
- Length: 10.8 km (6.7 mi)

Basin features
- Progression: Fulda→ Weser→ North Sea

The Solz is a river in Hesse, Germany. It flows into the Fulda in Bebra, about 15 km downstream from another Fulda tributary named Solz. It has a length of 10.8 km (6.7 mi).

== See also ==
- List of rivers of Hesse
