= Solz (southern) =

River in Germany

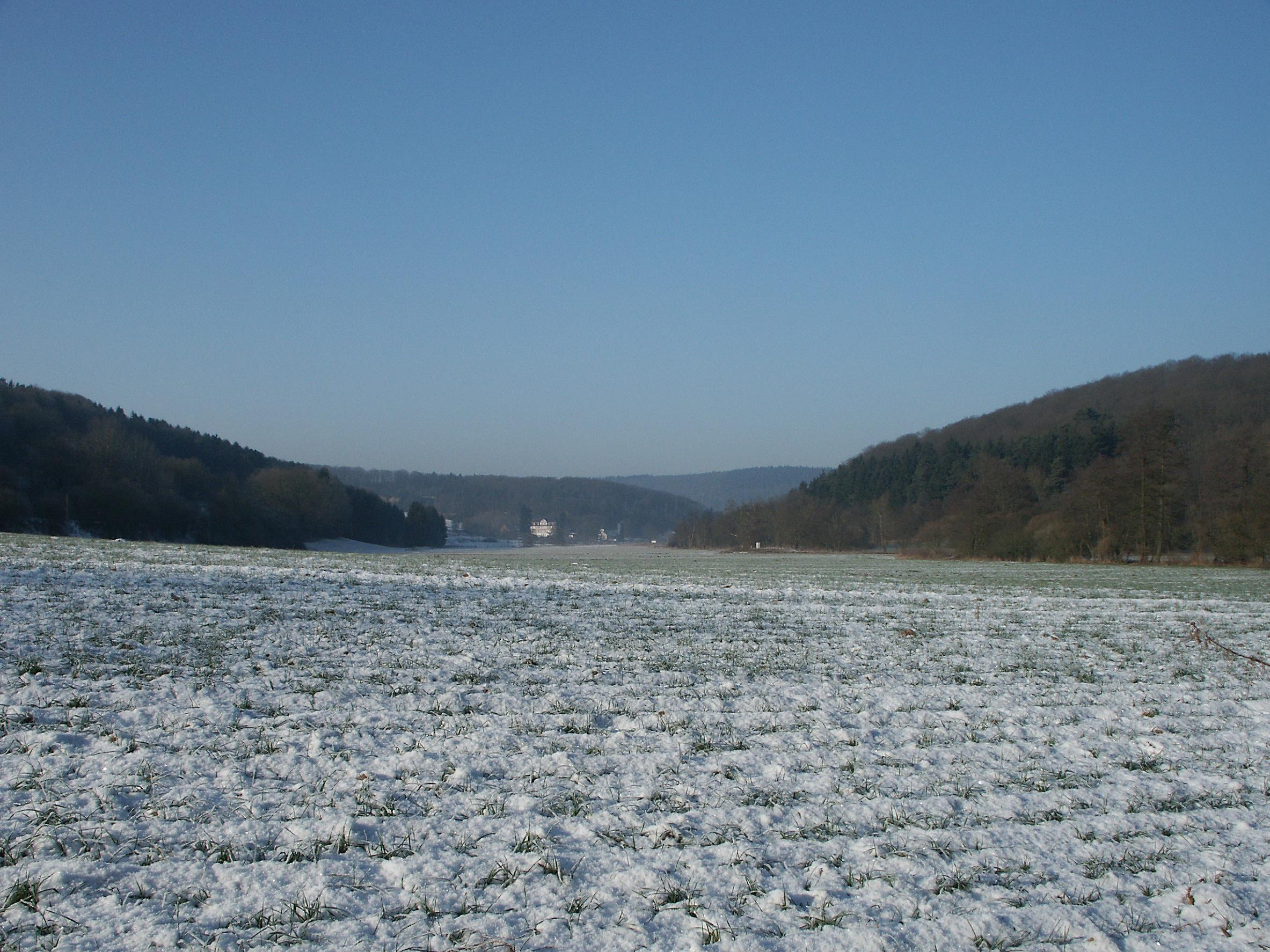

Location
- Country: Germany
- State: Hesse

Physical characteristics
- Mouth
  - location: Fulda
  - coordinates: 50°53′09″N 9°43′50″E
- Length: 21.5 km (13.4 mi)

Basin features
- Progression: Fulda→ Weser→ North Sea

The Solz is a river in Hesse, Germany. It flows into the Fulda near Bad Hersfeld, about 15 km upstream from another Fulda tributary named Solz.

== See also ==
- List of rivers of Hesse
