= August von Trott zu Solz =

German politician

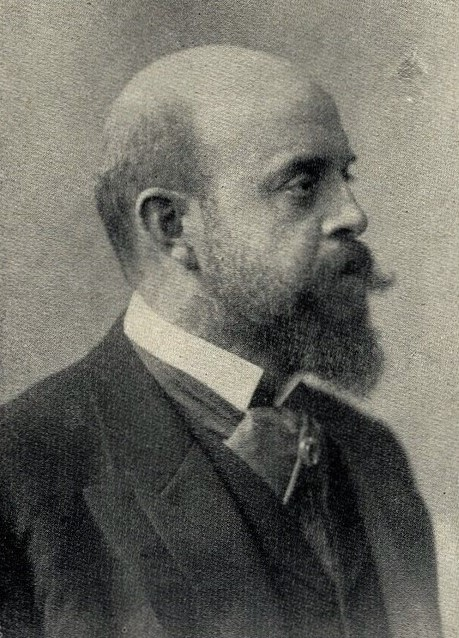
August von Trott zu Solz (1909)

August Bodo Wilhelm Clemens Paul von Trott zu Solz (29 December 1855 – 27 October 1938) was a German aristocrat, lawyer and politician during the German Empire and the Weimar Republic.

August Trott zu Solz was born in Hesse-Kassel into the noble Trott zu Solz family. He studied law and political science at the universities of Würzburg, Heidelberg and Leipzig. He became an administrative lawyer in the Prussian government in 1884, becoming the Landrat (local administrator) of Höchst in 1886 and of Marburg in 1892. He served in the Prussian House of Representatives from 1894 to 1898. Trott zu Solz was appointed Regierungspräsident of the regional government at Koblenz in 1898, and at Kassel the following year. He advanced to Oberpräsident of the Province of Brandenburg from 1905 to 1909.

Trott zu Solz became the minister of culture of the Kingdom of Prussia from 1909 to 1917 in the cabinet of Chancellor Theobald von Bethmann Hollweg, where he played a leading role in the founding of the Kaiser Wilhelm Society. He was Oberpräsident of the Province of Hesse-Nassau from 1917 to 1919. Following the political upheaval of the German revolution of 1918–1919, he resigned and retired to his estate. From 1921 to 1926, he represented the Hesse-Nassau in the Reichsrat, the council of states newly established by the Weimar constitution. Between 1917 and 1933, he was a member of the Senate of the Kaiser Wilhelm Society.

Trott zu Solz was the father of Adam von Trott zu Solz. He died in Nassau, Germany.

== Sources ==
- Thomas Klein: Leitende Beamte der allgemeinen Verwaltung in der preußischen Provinz Hessen-Nassau und in Waldeck 1867 bis 1945 (= Quellen und Forschungen zur hessischen Geschichte. Vol.70), Hessische Historische Kommission Darmstadt, Historische Kommission für Hessen, Darmstadt/Marburg 1988, ISBN 3-88443-159-5, pg.225.
- Benigna von Krusenstjern (2016). "Trott zu Solz, August Bodo Wilhelm Klemens Paul". Neue Deutsche Biographie (in German). Vol. 26. Berlin: Duncker & Humblot. pp. 457–458. (full text online).
- Jochen Lengemann: MdL Hessen. 1808–1996. Biographischer Index (= Politische und parlamentarische Geschichte des Landes Hessen. Vol.14 = Veröffentlichungen der Historischen Kommission für Hessen. Vol.48, 7). Elwert, Marburg 1996, ISBN 3-7708-1071-6, pp. 384–385.
- Bernhard Mann: Biographisches Handbuch für das preußische Abgeordnetenhaus. 1867–1918 (= Handbücher zur Geschichte des Parlamentarismus und der politischen Parteien. Vol.3). Droste, Düsseldorf 1988, ISBN 3-7700-5146-7, pp. 390 f.
