= Trott zu Solz =

Noble family

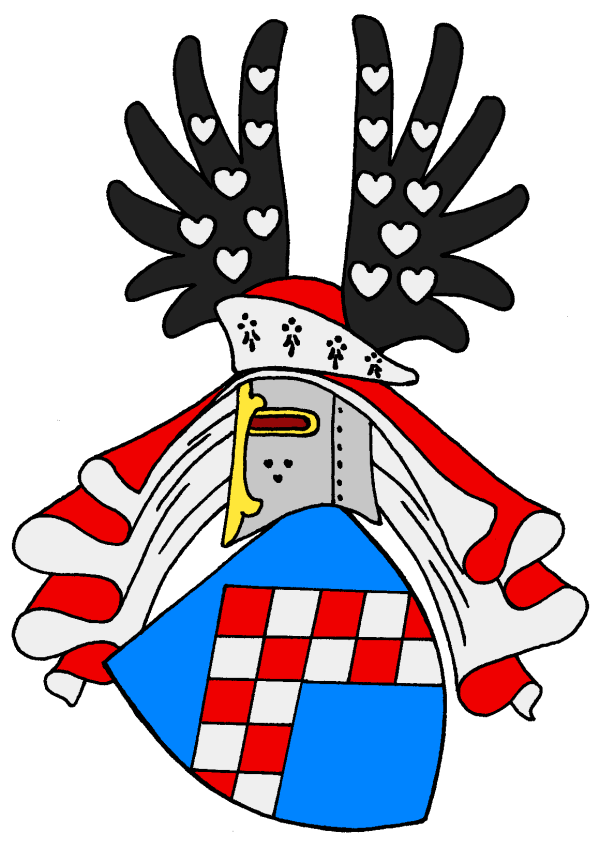
The family's original arms

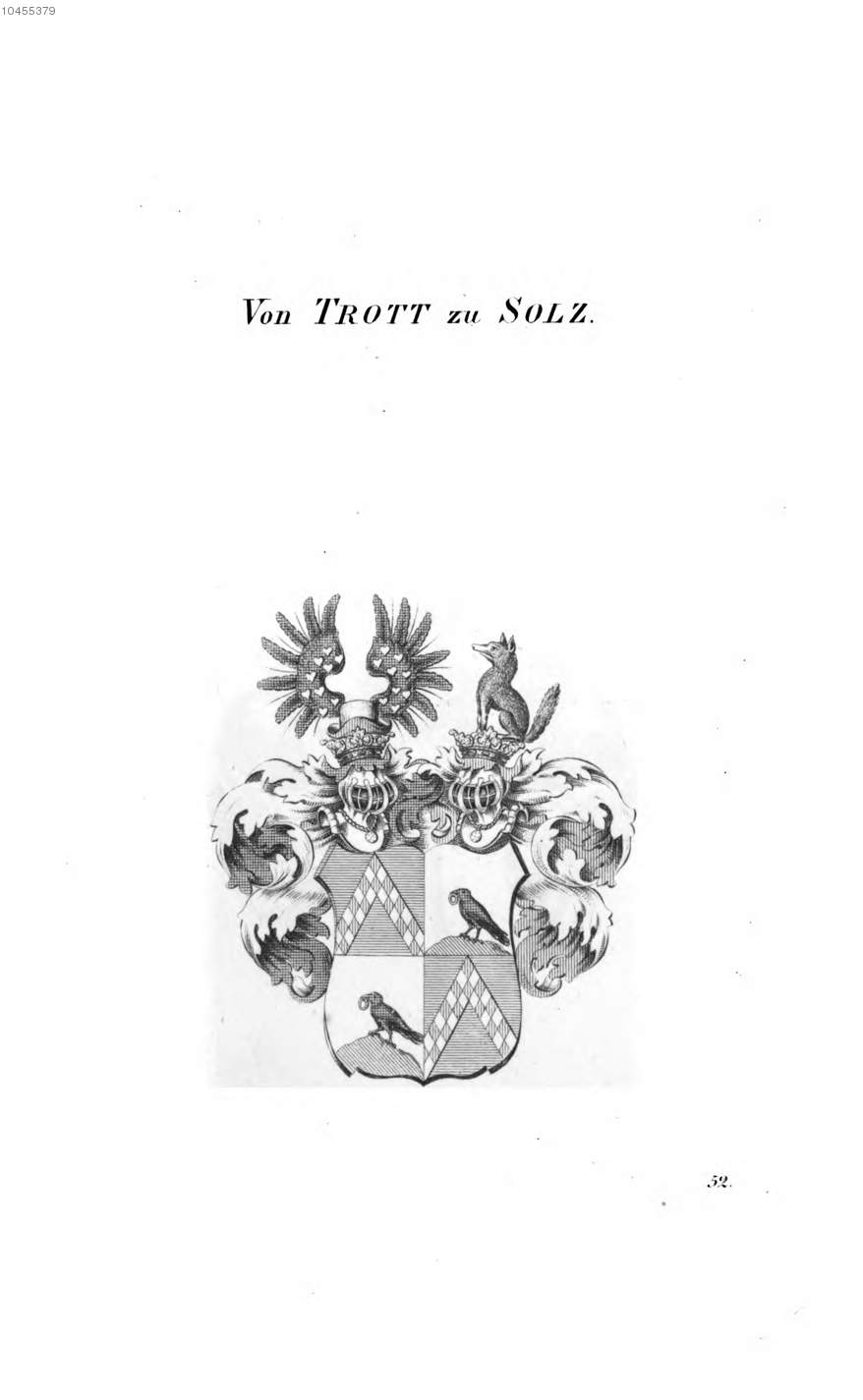
Later arms of the family

The Trott zu Solz family is a Hessian noble family and a member of the Hessian Protestant Uradel and the Old Hessian Knighthood. It is descended from the knight Hermann Trott, who was mentioned in 1253.

The family seat is in Solz, where the family has a manor, and the family also has a castle in Imshausen. The family has two branches, Solz and Imshausen. The Imshausen branch became Imperial Barons in 1778, while the Solz branch was recognized as Barons in 1812.

Several members of the family have been prominent diplomats and politicians, including August von Trott zu Solz, Prussian Minister of Culture, and his son Adam von Trott zu Solz, a diplomat and conservative anti-Nazi activist who would have been appointed Secretary of State in the Foreign Office and lead negotiator with the western allies if the 20 July plot had succeeded.
