= Adam von Trott zu Solz =

German noble and diplomat (1909–1944)

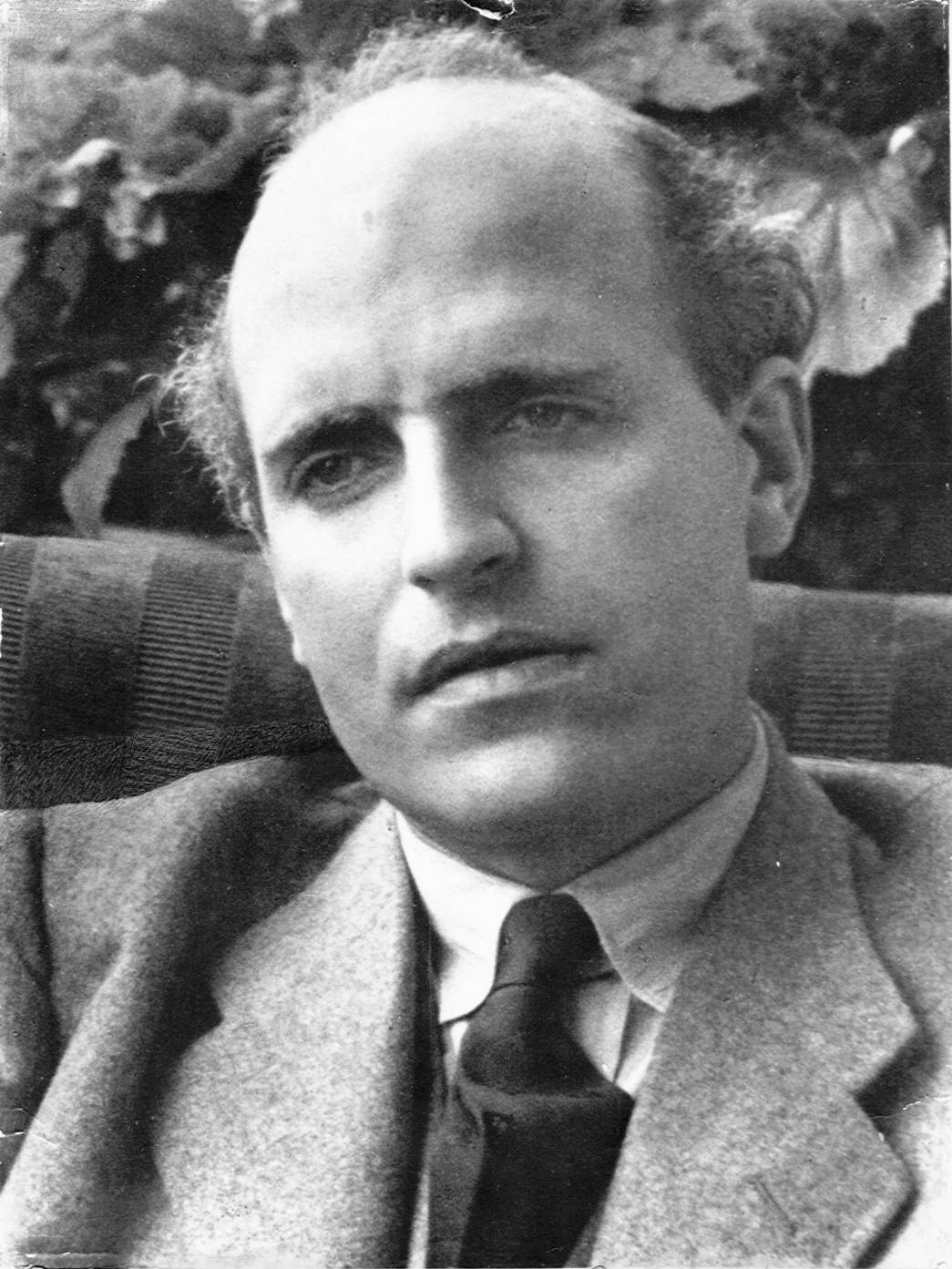
- Trott zu Solz in 1943
- Born: 9 August 1909; Potsdam, Kingdom of Prussia, German Empire
- Died: 26 August 1944 (aged 35); Plötzensee Prison, Berlin, Nazi Germany
- Cause of death: Execution by hanging
- Education: Ludwig-Maximilians-Universität München; University of Göttingen; Mansfield College, Oxford; Balliol College, Oxford
- Occupations: Diplomat, lawyer
- Known for: Opposing the Nazi government and taking part in the 20 July Plot
- Spouse: Clarita Tiefenbacher (m. 1940)
- Children: Two daughters
- Parents: August von Trott zu Solz; Emilie Eleonore zu Solz

Friedrich Adam von Trott zu Solz (9 August 1909 – 26 August 1944) was a German lawyer and diplomat who was involved in the conservative resistance to Nazism. A declared opponent of the Nazi regime from the beginning, he actively participated in the Kreisau Circle of Helmuth James Graf von Moltke and Peter Yorck von Wartenburg. Together with Claus von Stauffenberg and Fritz-Dietlof von der Schulenburg, he conspired in the 20 July plot and was supposed to have been appointed Secretary of State in the German Foreign Office and lead negotiator with the Western Allies if the plot had succeeded.

== Life ==
=== Early life and career ===
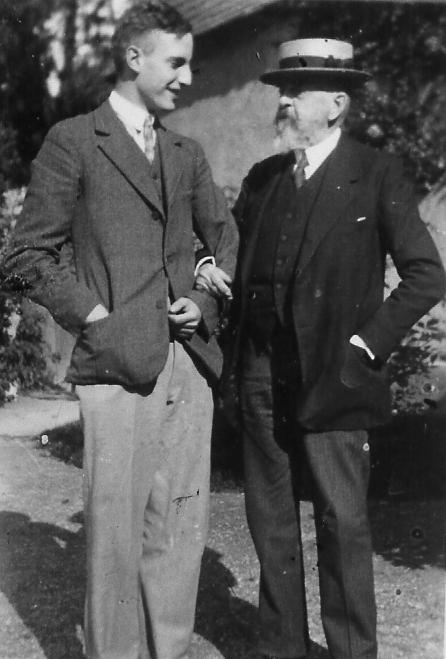
Adam von Trott zu Solz and his father, c. 1925

Trott was born in Potsdam, Brandenburg, into the Protestant Trott zu Solz dynasty, members of the Hessian Uradel nobility. He was the fifth child of the Prussian Culture Minister August von Trott zu Solz (1855–1938) and his wife Emilie Eleonore von Schweinitz (1875–1948), whose father served as German ambassador in Vienna and Saint Petersburg. By her mother, Anna Jay, Emilie Eleonore was a great-great granddaughter of John Jay, one of the Founding Fathers of the United States and the first Chief Justice of the United States.

Trott was first raised in Berlin and from 1915 was sent to the Französisches Gymnasium preschool. When his father resigned from office in 1917, the family moved to Kassel, where Trott attended the Friedrichsgymnasium. From 1922, he lived in Hann. Münden and temporarily joined the German Youth Movement. He obtained his Abitur school leaving certificate in 1927 and went on to study law at the Ludwig-Maximilians-Universität München and the University of Göttingen.

Trott developed a strong interest in international politics during a stay in Geneva, seat of the League of Nations, for several weeks in Autumn 1928. He spent Hilary term of 1929 in Oxford, studying theology at Mansfield College, Oxford, when he became a friend of the historian A. L. Rowse. Trott returned to Oxford in 1931 on a Rhodes Scholarship to study at Balliol College, where he gained a number of close friends including David Astor and Diana Hopkinson (née Hubback), whose memoirs and letters would later become key documents of Trott's life in Nazi Germany, and with whom he possibly engaged in a love affair. He also made the acquaintance of the eminent philosopher R. G. Collingwood. Rowse, a homosexual, developed an intense infatuation with the heterosexual Trott and called him one of the most beautiful, intelligent and charming men he had ever met. In his 1961 book All Souls and Appeasement, which was published when active homosexuality was still a crime in Britain, Rowse wrote about Trott's "beautiful head" with an "immensely lofty forehead, deep-violet eyes, nobility and sadness in the expression even when young, infinitely sensitive and understanding". He wrote, "I had never met anything like it". Rowse called his relationship with Trott an "ideal platonic" relationship and said that Trott was a man he could never forget. Rowse, who was active in the Labour Party, claimed to have introduced Trott to socialism and noted that Trott had translated parts of Rowse's book Politics and the Younger Generation into German when they were published in Neue Blätter für den Sozialismus. Following his studies at Oxford, Trott spent six months in the United States.

Deeply influenced by the theories of Hegel, Trott believed that the most pressing issue raised by the Great Depression would be how to seek a synthesis of conservatism and socialism, which he believed to be the only solution to the Great Depression. For Trott, the Great Depression proved the failure of capitalism as an economic system, but at the same time, he was unwilling to accept communism as an alternative, which led him to seek a "third way" between capitalism and communism, arguing in a 1933 letter to his father that the "right to work" had replaced Hegel's "right to a free will" as the most pressing issue of the modern age. In the same letter, Trott argued that what was needed was an economic system that guaranteed every man a job, and that he considered the individual freedom to count for nothing if one was unemployed. Somewhat to the shock of his conservative father, in the early 1930s Trott was willing to exchange ideas with Social Democrats as he set about developing a sort of socialist conservatism. Trott told his father in February 1933 that "the positive rights of the individual" could be secured if the rights of the "masses" were "held sacred", which he believed the new government of Adolf Hitler and Franz von Papen had no intention of doing.

=== Travels ===
In 1937, Trott was posted to China as a research fellow for the Institute of Pacific Relations under a research grant from the Auswärtiges Amt. He took advantage of his travels to try to raise support outside Germany for the internal resistance against the Nazis. At the time there was an informal alliance between China and Germany, with a German military mission training the Chinese National Revolutionary Army, which was largely armed with German weapons, and German businesses being favored with investments in China in exchange for China helping German rearmament by selling the Reich certain strategic raw materials at below cost. Given the closeness in relations between China and Germany, as a German citizen, Trott enjoyed a certain privileged status in China, as Generalissimo Chiang Kai-shek had often described Nazi Germany as a model for China.

A Sinophile, Trott had gone to China to study Confucian philosophy and learn Mandarin, as he put it that he was hoping to find in "China's ancient wisdom" a solution to the spiritual malaise of the West. Trott believed that modern Western civilization had lost any sense of the spiritual, which he believed still existed in China. The British historian D. C. Watt rather dismissively wrote that Trott was an impractical idealist who spent much of 1937 and 1938 in China looking for the answers to the problems of modern life by studying Confucianism and Taoism. The Confucian ideal of rule by enlightened and philosophical mandarins also appealed to Trott as an inspiration for a political system. The Confucian principle that mandarins should not serve an unjust emperor and that it was better to suffer and die rather than serve a tyrant influenced Trott's political thinking. Together with his Chinese teacher who served as his translator, Trott traveled several times to Beijing to talk to various Confucian scholars living in that city, hoping to find the spirituality that he believed the West was lacking and needed so desperately. During the Sino-Japanese War, which began in July 1937, Trott's sympathies were entirely with China. During his time in China, Trott got to know the head of the German military mission, General Alexander von Falkenhausen, very well, and as both men were disillusioned by the pro-Japanese line taken by the Auswärtiges Amt after the very pro-Japanese and anti-Chinese Joachim von Ribbentrop became Foreign Minister in February 1938, they bonded over their shared disapproval of Ribbentrop and his anti-Chinese foreign policy line. In June 1938, the German military mission in China was ordered to return to the Reich and Germany ceased its arm sales to China as Ribbentrop swung German foreign policy decisively behind Japan, causing a rapid chill to set in over the once warm relations between Nanking and Berlin. Trott decided to leave China at the same time that the German military mission was recalled.

One of Trott's closest friends was the British journalist Shiela Grant Duff who, however, passionately disagreed with him over the issue of Czechoslovakia, a country that she admired and loved as much he hated it. The nationalist Trott made no secret of his dislike of Czechoslovakia as an "artificial state" created by the Treaty of Versailles and believed that Germany had the right to annex the Sudetenland region, meaning that essentially Trott supported Hitler's foreign policy regarding Czechoslovakia in 1938. The Chinese historian Liang Hsi-Huey wrote there was a certain dichotomy in Trott's thinking between his dislike of the Nazis and his support for Germany's great power ambitions, which made for an ambivalent attitude towards Nazi foreign policy. Liang, whose father Liang Lone was the Chinese minister in Prague between 1933 and 1939, wrote that people like Trott, conservative nationalists opposed to Hitler who sympathised with China in its struggle against Japan, had much difficulty accepting the thesis that nations like Czechoslovakia had the right to exist. Liang wrote that there was a striking contrast between Trott's views towards China, which he argued had the right to determine its own future and should not be dominated by Japan, versus his views towards Czechoslovakia, which he saw as an "artificial state" that was occupying land that rightfully belonged to Germany. The British historian Sir John Wheeler-Bennett, who knew most of the men involved in the plots against Hitler between 1938 and 1944 personally, wrote that these men were all nationalists whose views towards Czechoslovakia and Poland were essentially the same as Hitler's – namely that Eastern Europe was Germany's rightful sphere of influence and the Reich had the right to take whatever it wanted in the region. After the Munich Agreement Trott, in a letter to his friend Lord Lothian, praised "Mr. Chamberlain's courageous lead" in ensuring that the Sudetenland was allowed to join Germany without a war and disparaged Winston Churchill as a "warmonger".

In 1939, during the course of three visits to London, Trott lobbied Lord Lothian and Lord Halifax to pressure the British government to abandon the "containment" policy directed against Hitler, which had been adopted on 31 March 1939 with the "Polish guarantee". Trott was a close friend of Ernst von Weizsäcker, the State Secretary at the Auswärtiges Amt, and he visited London as an unofficial diplomat representing Weizsäcker who, in a move reflecting the chaotic politics of Nazi Germany, had adopted his foreign policy that ran parallel to the policy of the Foreign Minister Ribbentrop. Weizsäcker, knowing that a planned German invasion of Poland scheduled for August 1939 (later pushed back to 1 September) was likely to cause an Anglo-German war, had adopted his policy of offering to restore independence to Czechoslovakia, without the Sudetenland, in exchange for which Britain would end the "guarantee" of Poland and allow Germany to reincorporate the Free City of Danzig, the Polish Corridor, and parts of Upper Silesia lost to Poland after the First World War. Weizsäcker was a man of extreme anti-Polish prejudices who warmly welcomed the idea of a war to destroy Poland, but he was rather less keen on the idea of a war with Britain, hence his repeated efforts to sever Britain from Poland in 1939. Like Weizsäcker, Trott was unwilling to consider returning the Sudetenland, but he was prepared to consider restoring Czech independence in exchange for Germany taking back all of the lands lost to Poland. The plan drawn up by Weizsäcker and Trott called for Britain to end the "guarantee" of Poland to pressure the Poles to return the disputed territories. Though Trott professed to believe the Poles would give in to German diplomatic pressure once the "guarantee" had been removed, such a situation would allow Germany to invade Poland without fear of a war with Britain, although Trott also claimed to believe that if such a situation were to emerge, then the Wehrmacht generals would overthrow Hitler. Rowse characterised Trott's visits to Britain in June 1939 as a "double mission, an official and an unofficial one": to sound out the British Establishment about where Britain stood in regards to the Danzig Crisis and to report this back to Hitler, and to also seek to make contacts with Britain on behalf of the resistance group. Trott spent the weekend of 2–3 June 1939 at Cliveden and on 7 June 1939 met Chamberlain at Chequers.

Lord Lothian told Trott that Britain was unwilling to undo the Munich Agreement and accepted the Sudetenland as part of the Reich, but it could not accept the Reich Protectorate of Bohemia-Moravia, as it was essential that Czech independence be restored; Anglo-German relations could not be improved unless that happened. As a Rhodes scholar, Trott was able to use his friends from Oxford in the Establishment to meet Prime Minister Neville Chamberlain and Foreign Secretary Lord Halifax in June 1939. At his meeting with Chamberlain at Chequers, Trott was informed that it was not possible for Britain to end the "guarantee" of Poland and that if Germany wanted better relations, "it was for Herr Hitler to undo the mischief he had done". Chamberlain complained that British public opinion had been "passionately stirred" by the German occupation of the rump state of Czecho-Slovakia in March 1939 and that Britain would go to war with Germany rather than see another nation "destroyed".

Trott submitted an account of his British visits to Walther Hewel, who in turn submitted it to Hitler. When Trott returned to Germany, Weizsäcker tried to set up a meeting for Trott to brief Hitler and Ribbentrop about his British visit, but neither wanted to see him. Trott returned to Britain for a third visit to repeat his "Danzig for Prague" offer, and this time he stated he was not coming on behalf of the German government, but rather as a representative of a resistance group, which confused British officials as to his true loyalties. The German historian Klemens von Klemperer argued that the purpose behind Trott's "Danzig for Prague" offer was to discredit Hitler, since he expected Hitler to refuse it if the British made it, which would somehow cause the Wehrmacht generals to turn against Hitler. Klemperer wrote that there was a certain lack of "clear strategy" behind the "Danzig for Prague" proposal, since Trott himself never entirely made it clear how this plan to ensure that the Free City of Danzig rejoining Germany without a war was supposed to cause the overthrow of Hitler.

Wheeler-Bennett, who had lived in Berlin between 1927 and 1934 and who met Trott during his visits to London in 1939, wrote that he "...had about him a certain confused political mysticism, a vague Hegelianism which induced in him, not, to be sure, the worship of the Führerprinzip, but a deep veneration for German military and political traditions, and what he believed to be the innate integrity of the German soul". Wheeler-Bennett further wrote that Trott and his friend Helmuth von Moltke, who came with him to London, were both intense German nationalists who "...though they deplored the spirit of the Munich Agreement and the subsequent dismemberment of Czechoslovakia, expressed strong anti-Czech sentiments, and from neither was there forthcoming any indication that a 'de-nazified' Germany was prepared to forgo Hitler's annexation of Austria and the Sudetenland. Indeed it was hinted from that Britain and France might well reward the conspirators, if successful, with the return of Germany's former colonial possessions". Rowse, who saw Trott for the last time during his visits to Britain in 1939, wrote that Trott's Hegelianism "profoundly affected his mind" as "with him black was never black, and white white; black was always in the process of becoming white, white of becoming black". Rowse wrote "...Adam entered deeply, ambivalently into relations with the Nazis without being one, indeed while belonging to the resistance movement".

The German historian Hans Mommsen wrote that the majority of the conservatives opposed to Hitler in no way wanted a return to the democratic Weimar Republic, which they also rejected, but instead looked back to the reformers who restructured Prussia during the Napoleonic Wars as their ideal and role model. For the anti-Nazi conservatives, the emphasis was upon reforming the system instead of a revolution to destroy it, as the majority of the conservatives believed in the ideal of the volksgemeinschaft that would unite the German people as one and only wanted a "true" volksgemeinschaft instead of what they saw as the twisted Nazi version of it. The emphasis was on putting into effect the "right" ideas of National Socialism, which the conservatives believed the Nazis had botched in the execution. In regards to foreign policy, the anti-Nazi conservatives believed that Hitler's foreign policy goal of making Germany into Europe's number one power was correct. Their objections to Nazi foreign policy were only that Hitler was executing his foreign policy in a reckless, adventurist way that threatened to create a coalition that would defeat Germany; they were only opposed to the means, not the ends, of Hitler's foreign policy. Mommsen argued what he called the "ambivalence" of Trott, who worked towards achieving certain Nazi foreign policy goals but at the same time worked for the overthrow of the Nazi regime, which makes sense if one accepts the thesis that Trott and others like him were out to reform the Volksgemeinschaft from what they saw as its Nazi perversion, instead of working for its destruction.

The distinction that Trott drew between Germany's "rightful" policy of seeking to undo the Treaty of Versailles and his opposition to the Nazi regime was often lost on his British friends since, for many of them, he was advocating the same foreign policy goals as Hitler. Trott did not understand the way in which British public opinion had changed as he spent much time in Britain attacking the Treaty of Versailles in such violent language that many of his British friends came to believe that he was no different from the Nazis. Rowse attended a meeting at the Cliveden estate, where von Trott spoke with Lord Lothian, Lord Astor, Lord Halifax and Sir Thomas Inskip about Anglo-German relations, repeated his "Danzig for Prague" offer and praised "the greatness of our Führer". However, Rowse said that when he was alone with Trott the latter said: "If they kill me, you will never forgive them, will you?"

Trott's ideas led to a complete rejection of democracy as a system morally no different from National Socialism. In 1938, Trott wrote to a British friend that what was happening in Germany was a "European phenomenon" and believed that with the Industrial Revolution, European society had become dehumanised and lost its spiritual core. Trott wrote that this was as much a problem in democratic as totalitarian countries: "It is my opinion that this pandering to the instinctual side of human consciousness, as much by democracy as by totalitarianism, is what has led to the sterile and cynical defeatism that lies at the root of Europe's intellectual chaos". Trott believed the "mass society" created by the Industrial Revolution had allowed demagogues to exploit "the masses" and argued that the "Anglo-Saxon" system of individual liberty built around democracy was essentially no different from National Socialism as it allowed "the masses" to be exploited. In a letter to Grant Duff, Trott wrote: "You have not satisfactorily answered my argument, that it is possible that capitalist and imperialist democracy may use liberty simply as a cloak for a policy that relies very much on compulsion, whereas some aspects of 'authoritarian systems could provide a basically more genuine guarantee of human rights in modern industrial society". In 1939, Trott wrote that the last ten years had shown the "indiscriminate trust in the judgement of the masses is no use.... One way or the other, popular movements have led to despotism".

In Trott's view, only the rule by Germany's traditional elites who were committed to conservative values and would rule according to the rule of law could ensure a truly just society. Trott believed that only in such a system, in which traditional elites ruled by excluding the masses from politics, could a political system be created that was genuinely concerned with the best interests of society. He told his friend Julie Braun-Vogelstein "Go and write an essay on Tradition and Socialism!" He meant that only the rules by traditional elites could really achieve socialism.

Trott called for a political system that would secure the "liberation of the masses from economic need" by the authoritarian rule by the traditional elites, whose values would be based on Christianity.

Various messengers from the Widerstand movements had arrived in Britain in 1938 to 1939 stating if only Britain abandoned appeasement, the leaders of the Wehrmacht would stage a putsch to depose Hitler, rather than fight a war with Britain again. In August 1939, the British government repeatedly warned Germany that an attack on Poland would cause a war with Britain. One reason was the hope that the Wehrmacht would indeed overthrow Hitler, rather than risk another world war.

On 1 September 1939, Germany invaded Poland and on 3 September 1939, Britain declared war on Germany. Despite the promises of numerous messengers, the Wehrmacht stayed loyal to Germany, continued on with the conquest of Poland and made no effort to depose Hitler. The fact that the Wehrmacht stayed loyal to Hitler in 1939 in spite of all the promises from anti-Nazi Germans that it would not, if only Britain made a firm stand against Hitler, greatly discredited the Widerstand movement in British eyes, and much of Trott's difficulty in enlisting British support from that fact.

A friend of Weizsäcker, Trott formally joined the Auswärtiges Amt in 1939 at his suggestion after having worked for the Auswärtiges Amt as a researcher on China for the previous two years. In October 1939, Trott went to the United States to attend a conference of the Institute of Pacific Relations, in Virginia Beach, in November 1939. On his way to the United States, Trott was almost interned in Gibraltar as an enemy alien when his ship had stopped there, but he was able to persuade the British officials that he was an Afrikaner from South Africa by using his Balliol tie as proof that he attended Balliol College, which was true, and thus meant that he could not be a German, which was not. He also visited Washington, D.C. in October of that year in an unsuccessful attempt to obtain American support. He met with Roger Nash Baldwin, Edward C. Carter, William J. Donovan and Felix Morley of The Washington Post. During the conference in Virginia Beach, Trott met numerous members of the business and academic worlds of the United States and Canada who were interested in China.

Wheeler-Bennett, who owned an estate in Virginia and shared Trott's interests in Sinology, also attended the conference in Virginia Beach and wrote:

"In the plenary sessions and committees of the conference, von Trott observed a very 'correct' attitude. He did not openly defend Nazi principles, but confined himself to several recapitulations of the German case on the usual well-known lines, which might be employed by Germans of nearly any political complexion. In private conversation, however, he used a very different tone, frankly declaring himself an anti-Nazi, yet maintaining that Germany must keep much of what she had taken in Poland. He stressed the readiness of the Army for a 'quick peace' on the basis of the status quo less Congress Poland, indicated the preparations already on foot for the restoration of the Rechsstaat in Germany, and urged the Western Allies to reiterate and redefine their peace terms on the lines of Mr. Chamberlain's speeches of September 4 and October 12, 1939. To the suggestion that a non-Nazi Germany might, as an earnest of good faith, restore some of the territorial acquisitions of Adolf Hitler, von Trott returned an uncompromising negative".

Trott's proposals were passed on to the US Department of State, the Canadian Ministry of External Affairs and the British Embassy in Washington DC, where the reaction was deeply negative, as the consensus was that Germany would have to give up its gains in Poland and the Czech lands as the price for peace, which Trott had indicated that he no interest in doing. However, Trott's suggestions for the basis of peace, which he wrote down after meeting several German emigres in the United States, were passed on the White House and led President Roosevelt to send Summer Welles, the undersecretary at the State Department, on a peace mission to Europe in February 1940 to try to mediate an end to the war.

=== Foreign Office ===
Friends warned Trott not to return to Germany, but his conviction that he had to do something to stop the madness of Hitler and his henchmen led him to return. Once there, in 1940 Trott joined the Nazi Party to access party information and monitor its planning. At the same time, he served as a foreign policy advisor to a clandestine group of intellectuals planning the overthrow of the Nazi regime, known as the Kreisau Circle.

In late spring 1941, Wilhelm Keppler, Secretary of State (Staatssekretär) at the German Foreign Office, was appointed director of Special Bureau for India (Sonderreferat Indien) created in the Information Ministry to aid and liaise with the Indian nationalist Subhas Chandra Bose, a former president of the Indian National Congress, who had arrived in Berlin in early April 1941. The day-to-day work with Bose became the responsibility of Trott, who used the cover of the Special Bureau for his anti-Nazi activities by travelling to Scandinavia, Switzerland and Turkey and all of Nazi-occupied Europe to seek out German military officers opposing Nazism. Bose and Trott, however, did not become close, and Bose most likely did not know about Trott's anti-Nazi work.

According to the historian Leonard A. Gordon, there were also tensions between Trott and Bose's wife, Emilie Schenkl, each disliking the other intensely.

Trott was a member of the Kreisau Circle, a group of intellectuals who believed in a sort of conservative Christian socialism, who met at the estate of Count von Moltke in Kreisau in Silesia. The Kreisau Circle was in contact with the main opposition group led by General Ludwig Beck and Carl Frederich Goerdeler but differed with the Beck–Goerdeler group over a number of issues. On 22 January 1943, at the house of Count Peter Hans Yorck von Wartenburg, a meeting was held between the two groups. Attending the meeting for the "senior group" were General Beck, Goerdeler, Ulrich von Hassell and Johannes Popitz and for the Kreisau Circle Moltke, Trott, Yorck von Wartenburg, Eugen Gerstenmaier and Fritz von der Schulenburg. The left-learning Kreisau Circle members objected to Goerdeler's beliefs in laissez-faire capitalism and to his plans to restore the monarchy. The clash between the two groups was in large part generational as the conservative "senior group" were all older men like Goerdeler who had come of age under the German Empire and were far more attached to the House of Hohenzollern than were the younger men like Trott, who had come of age under the Weimar Republic. The diplomat Hassell of the "seniors" and the policeman Schulenburg of the "juniors" mediated a compromise, despite the shouting between Goerdeler and Moltke, but the differences were by no means resolved. After the meeting of 22 January, no conferences were held, but Trott and Schulenburg remained in regular contact with Hassell and Popitiz.

In 1942, Trott, together with other members of the Kreisau Circle, became vaguely aware of the "Final Solution to the Jewish Question" and became curious of the fate of the Jews sent away to "resettlement in the East". In March 1943, Trott reported at a meeting of the Kreisau Circle that he learned through sources within the Reich government that he considered very reliable that there was a concentration camp in Upper Silesia that held about 40,000–50,000 people with a "killing rate" of 3,000–4,000 people per month. Trott did not name the camp in Upper Silesia, but it seems that he was referring to Auschwitz concentration camp.

Like most other German conservatives, Trott had deep doubts about the intelligence and morality of ordinary people and held that only an elite had the necessary qualities to govern. In 1943, Trott wrote: "An exclusively rationalist upbringing has made us fail to understand both human nature and the realities of mass society, and we have come to ignore the demons which the Vermassung of mankind has released". Trott believed in the original positive view of the Sonderweg of Germany as a Central European power, which was neither of the West nor of the East. He expressed these ideas in his memorandum Germany Between East and West, which is lost, but according to those who read it called for Germany to seek a "middle way" between the "eastern principle of political realism" and the "western principle of individuality", which in practice would mean a social-economic system that would be a mixture of both capitalism and communism. He believed that "eastern" countries like the Soviet Union were too collectivist, "western" countries like the United States were too individualistic, and Germans like himself needed to develop a middle way between east and west for the betterment of all of humanity. Trott believed that both capitalist democracy and communism were flawed systems that had dehumanised society and that Germany should follow neither.

Despite Trott's reputation as someone oriented towards "Western" values, based on his education at Oxford and his Anglo-American friends, he was in fact deeply hostile towards the American "pioneer" ideal of a rugged individualist on both moral and practical grounds and believed that such individualism promoted selfishness, greed and amorality.

Trott came to find his political idea in the mir ("commune") of Imperial Russia. Germans tended to have two contradictory pictures of Russia as viewing it as a primitive and savage "Asian" country that was threatening Europe or seeing it in idealised and romantic terms as a place in which the people were simple but more spiritual than the people in the West. Trott had a rather idealised and romanticised view of the mir, as he believed the Russian muzhiks had a lifestyle where everybody worked together as a community but still allowed room for individualism, non-conformity and eccentricities, the perfect blend of the extremes between East and West that Trott sought for Germany. Trott believed the life of the muzhiks in the mir was deeply influenced by the values of Orthodox Church, making for a very spiritual life while at the same time accepting individualism and rationality. Moreover, Trott believed life in the mir was simple and in harmony with nature; was untouched by either modern technology or ideology; and allowed people to be honest, spiritual and personal in a way that was not possible in either the Soviet Union or the West. He believed that the Soviet regime had in its campaign to "collectivise" Soviet farms had destroyed his idealised mir, but his romantic view of the mir provided the basis for Trott's thinking about the sort of society that he wanted to bring about. Trott's beliefs about the need for more "spiritual" society brought him into conflict with Carl Goerdeler and Colonel Hans Oster, who wanted to restore the monarchy and bring back the system that had existed up until 1918 in Germany, which Trott rejected by arguing that something new was needed.

Trott belonged to the "Easterner" faction of the opposition, which favoured making peace with the Soviet Union first after the overthrow of Hitler and distrusted the "Anglo-Saxon" powers of the United States and Great Britain. In December 1943, Trott told Hassell that he felt the United States and the United Kingdom were too fearful of "a change of regime [in Germany] should turn out to be only a cloak hiding a continuation of militaristic Nazi methods under another label". Certain underground Social Democratic politicians complained of an increase of the appeal of the underground Communist Party and of the Soviet-sponsored Free German National Committee among the German working class. As a result, the underground SPD politicians asked their "parlour-pink" friend Trott to appeal to the United States and Britain to change their policies towards Germany. In April 1944, during a visit to Switzerland, Trott met with British and American diplomats to complain that to most anti-Nazi Germans, it seemed that "the Anglo-Saxon countries are filled with bourgeois prejudice and pharisaic theorizing", in contrast to the Soviets, who were offering "constructive ideas and plans for the rebuilding of Germany". Trott stated that after three years of war with the Soviet Union, the Wehrmacht now had considerable respect for the fighting power of the Red Army, and he claimed that the propaganda of the Free Germany Committee in Moscow, which made a distinction between the German people and the Nazi regime, was having much impact in Germany.

Wheeler-Bennett wrote that Trott was "no Red sympathizer" and what he was "endeavouring to do, in fact, was to induce London and Washington to engage in a bidding match with Moscow from the result of which Germany could not but benefit, but he certainly did not favor a Bolshevik solution". Wheeler-Bennett wrote the thinking of the Kreisau Circle was very "confused", but they "were not Communists". Wheeler-Bennett concluded: "Their thinking, it is true, turned to the East rather than the West because, in their idealistic impractical illusions, they looked for an upheaval both in Russia and in Germany. If this were to occur, the two states would have many problems in common, problems which could not be solved by the established bourgeois standards of the West, but which called for a radically new treatment which should be neither authoritarian nor democratic, but which should be guided by a return to 'the spiritual (but not the ecclesiastical) traditions of Christianity'".

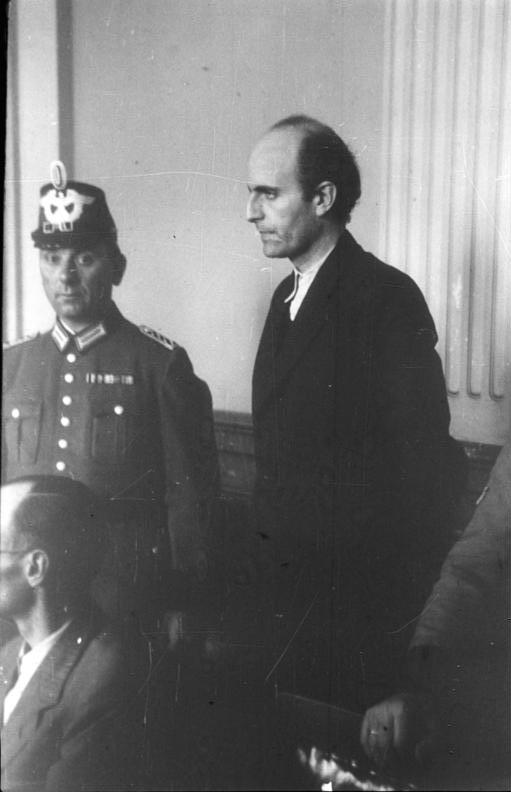
Trott zu Solz on trial at the Volksgerichtshof, 1944

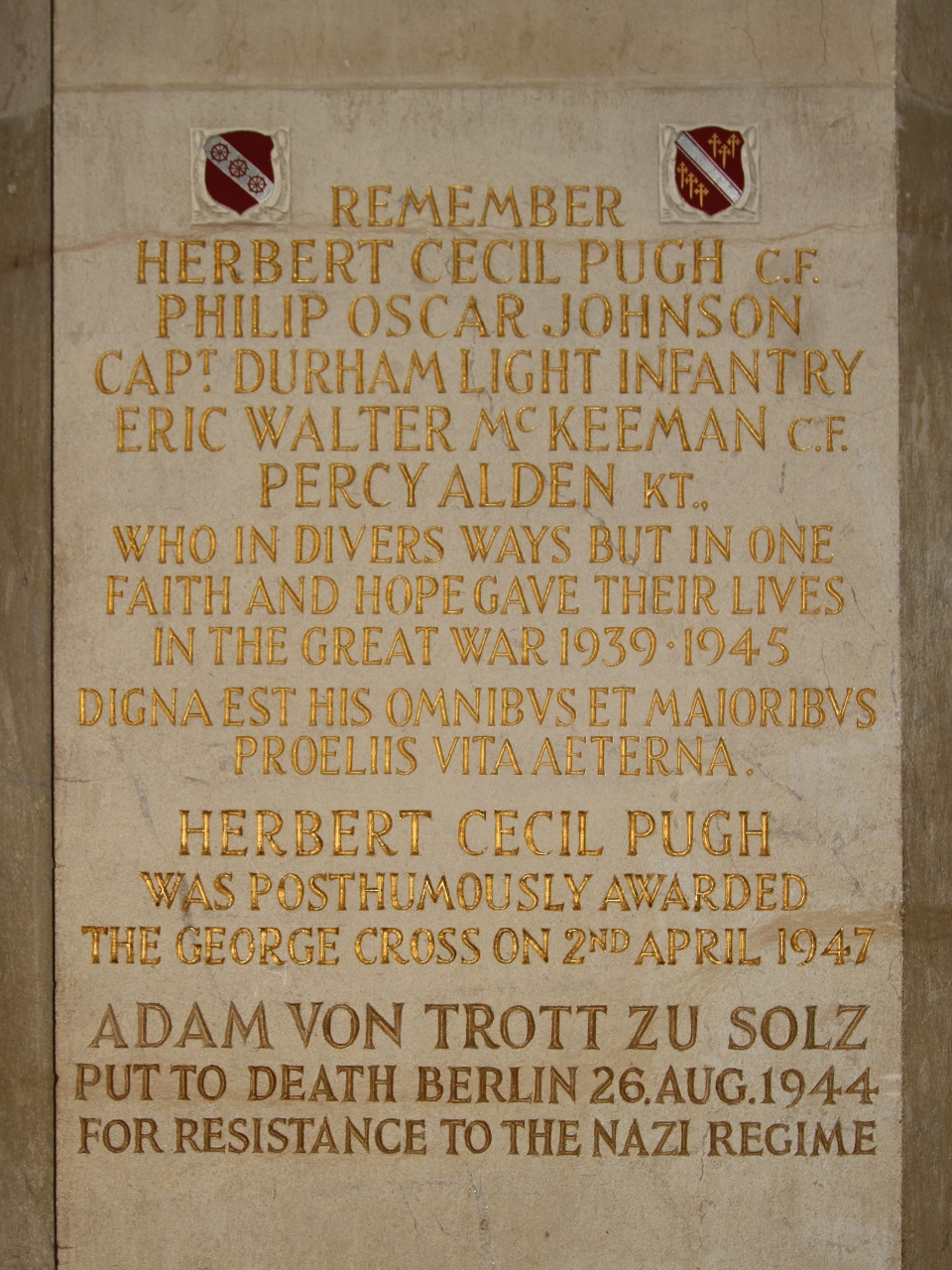
Inscription in the chapel of Mansfield College, Oxford in memory of alumni including Trott zu Solz

=== 20 July 1944 plot ===
Trott was one of the leaders of Colonel Claus von Stauffenberg's plot of 20 July 1944 to assassinate Hitler. He was arrested within days, placed on trial and found guilty. Sentenced to death on 15 August 1944 by the Volksgerichtshof (People's Court), he was hanged in Berlin's Plötzensee Prison on 26 August.

== Commemoration ==
Trott is one of five Germans who are commemorated on the World War II memorial stone at Balliol College, Oxford. His name is also recorded among the Rhodes Scholars war dead in the Rotunda of Rhodes House, Oxford.

In July 1998, the British magazine Prospect published an edited version of the lecture given by the German historian Joachim Fest at the inauguration of the Adam von Trott Meeting Room at Balliol College, Oxford. Fest said:

Few witnesses have spoken up for the resistance and few sentences have survived to describe the debates of the "Kreisauer Kreis," the urgent pleas of Stauffenberg and Tresckow, the thoughts of Haefte, Moltke, York and Leber. Von Trott's final memorandum – he said he had put his heart into it – has also been lost. Even the minutes of the hearings in the People's Court, where the conspirators were able to proclaim the principles which had governed their actions for the last time, have survived only as fragments: some were manipulated by the censor. This silence from the original sources has prolonged the isolation which surrounded the resistance from its beginnings. In fact, it has contributed to what might be called its second defeat. Commemorating the name of Adam von Trott in a meeting room at Balliol College is thus an act of justice.

The Adam von Trott Memorial Appeal at Mansfield College runs annual lectures on themes relevant to his life and work, and funds scholarships for young Germans to read for a master's degree in politics at the college.

== Clarita von Trott ==
Trott married Clarita Tiefenbacher in June 1940. He was survived by her (she had been jailed for some months) and by their two daughters, who were taken from their grandmother's house by the Gestapo after his execution and given to Nazi Party families for adoption. Their mother recovered them in 1945. Clarita died in Berlin at the age of 95 on 28 March 2013.

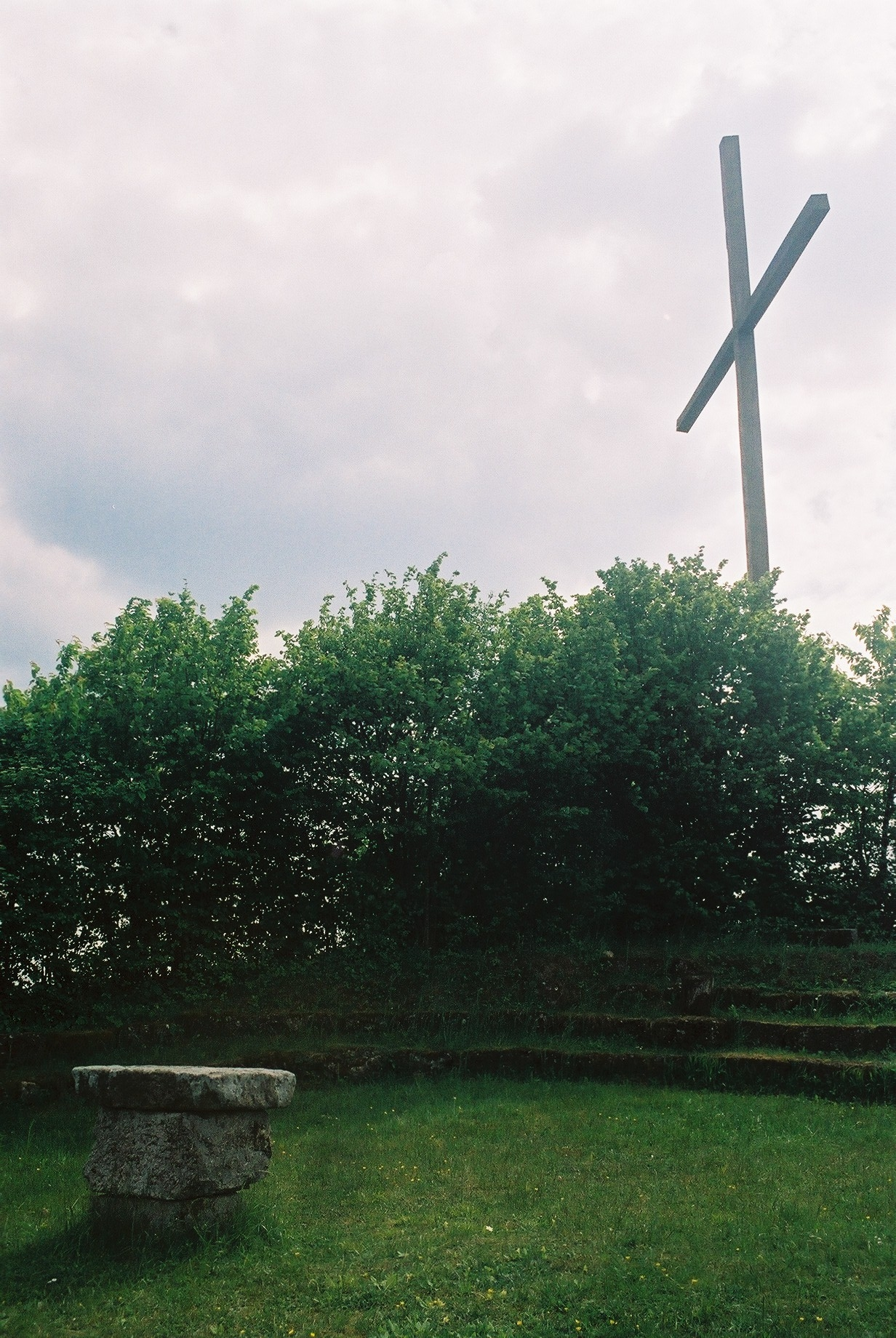
Monument to Trott zu Solz at Imshausen

== Quotations ==
- "I am also a Christian, as are those who are with me. We have prayed before the crucifix and have agreed that since we are Christians, we cannot violate the allegiance we owe God. We must therefore break our word given to him who has broken so many agreements and still is doing it. If only you knew what I know Goldmann! There is no other way! Since we are Germans and Christians we must act, and if not soon, then it will be too late. Think it over till tonight." (Trott was speaking in an attempt to recruit Lieutenant Gereon Goldmann, a German Army medic and former Roman Catholic seminarian. Goldmann had balked at violating the soldier's oath and had questioned the morality of assassinating Hitler. However, Goldmann overcame his qualms and joined the 20 July Plot as a carrier of dispatches.)

== Works ==
- Hegels Staatsphilosophie und das internationale Recht; Diss. Göttingen (V&R), 1932

== Sources ==
- Gordon, Leonard A. (1990). Brothers against the Raj: a biography of Indian nationalists Sarat and Subhas Chandra Bose. Columbia University Press. ISBN 978-0-231-07442-1.
- Hayes, Romain (2011). Subhas Chandra Bose in Nazi Germany: Politics, Intelligence and Propaganda 1941–1943. Oxford University Press. ISBN 978-0-19-932739-3.
- Klemperer, Klemens von, ed. (1988). A Noble Combat—The Letters of Shiela Grant Duff and Adam von Trott zu Solz, 1932–1939. Clarendon Press. ISBN 0-19-822908-9.
- Klemperer, Klemens von (1994). German Resistance Against Hitler: The Search for Allies Abroad 1938-1945. Oxford University Press. ISBN 978-0-19-151334-3.
- Kuhlmann, Jan (2003). Subhas Chandra Bose und die Indienpolitik der Achsenmächte. Berlin; Tübingen: Verlag Hans Schiler. ISBN 978-3-89930-064-2.
- Liang, Hsi-Huey (1999). ""China, the Sino-Japanese Conflict, and the Munich Crisis". In Igor Lukes; Erik Goldstein (eds.). The Munich Crisis, 1938 Prelude to World War II. Frank Cass. pp. 342–369. ISBN 0-7146-8056-7.
- MacDonogh, Giles (1990). A good German: Adam von Trott zu Solz. Quartet Books. ISBN 978-0-7043-0215-0.
- Mommsen, Hans (2003). Alternatives to Hitler German Resistance Under the Third Reich. Princeton University Press. ISBN 0-691-11693-8.
- Rowse, A. L. (1961). All Souls And Appeasement – A Contribution to Contemporary history. London/New York: Macmillan & Co.
- Sykes, Christopher (1968). Troubled loyalty: a biography of Adam von Trott zu Solz. London: Collins. ISBN 9780072368970.
- Watt, D.C. (1989). How War Came The Immediate Origins of World War II. London: Pantheon.
- Weinberg, Gerhard (1980). The Foreign Policy of Hitler's Germany Starting World War Two 1937–1939. University of Chicago Press: Chicago. ISBN 0391038265.
- Wheeler-Bennett, John W. (1953). The Nemesis of Power – The German Army in Politics, 1918–1945. London/New York: Macmillan & Co.
- Wheeler-Bennett, John W. (1976). Friends, Enemies and Sovereigns. London: Macmillan. ISBN 0333181689.
