= Paul von Breitenbach =

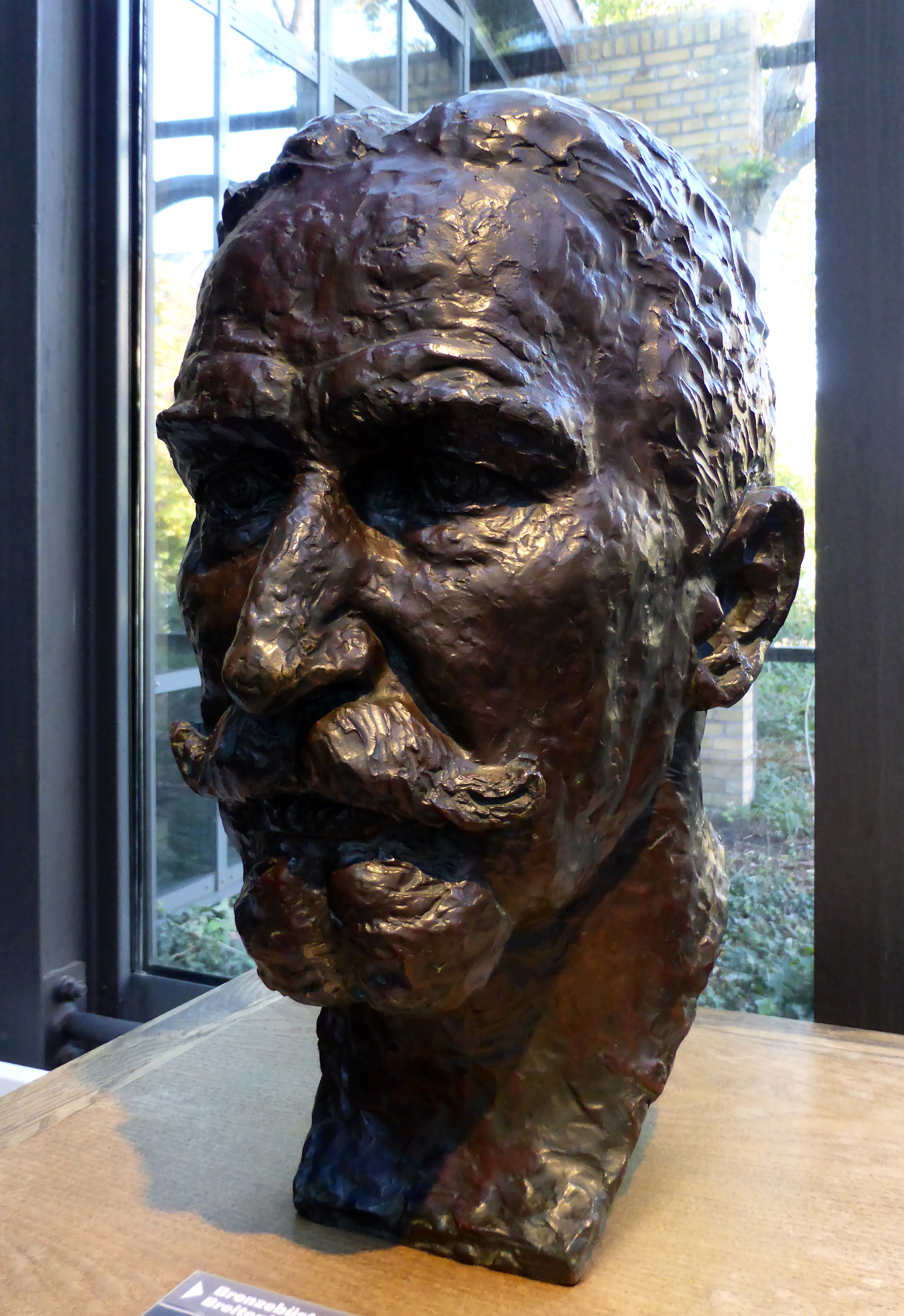
Paul von Breitenbach

Paul Justin von Breitenbach (16 April 1850 – 10 March 1930) was a Prussian politician and railway planner.

Breitenbach was central to the building of the underground in Berlin, specifically the line between the city center and Berlin-Dahlem (today U3). The Breitenbachplatz in Dahlem was named after him in 1913.

== Life ==
Breitenbach was born in Danzig (Gdańsk) in the Province of Prussia. His father was a lawyer: Paul was one of seven recorded siblings. After attendind the Gymnasium (secondary school) he moved on to study law in Leipzig 1869 and continued in Berlin. In 1881 he moved to the town of Altona near Hamburg.

== Career ==
1872 and 1873 he was Gerichtsreferendar (Assistant) in Danzig, and then Gerichtsassessor at the local court in Berlin. In 1878 he entered the Prussian state railways administration, first in Hanover, then from 1880 on in Breslau (Wrocław). In July 1884 he came to Berlin to work for the state-owned Berlin-Hamburg railway.

From 1893-95, Breitenbach was the director of the Eisenbahn-Betriebsamt (railway traffic office), first in Hanover, later in Hamburg. In 1896 he was a commissioner to the Prussian Minister for Public Works in Mainz. In 1897 he became president of the Royal Prussian and Grand Duchy of Hesse Railway Division (Königliche Preußische und Großherzogliche Hessische Eisenbahndirektion), the Prussian and Hessian railway management in Mainz.

In 1903 Breitenbach moved to Cologne, taking up the post as president of the Königliche Eisenbahndirektion. From there, the Reich Chancellor, Bernhard von Bülow, made Breitenbach the Minister of Public Works in 1906. He remained there until 1916. During this time, he was also the head of the Imperial Office for the Management of the Imperial Railways in Alsace-Lorraine (Reichsamt für die Verwaltung der Reichseisenbahnen in Elsaß-Lothringen).

In 1909 he was ennobled by William II, German Emperor, and, in 1913, he received the Order of the Black Eagle.

From May 1916 until November 1917, Breitenbach was the vice president of the government of Prussia. After the German Revolution, on 11 November 1918, he retired. He died in Bückeburg.
