= Louis-Georges Rabot =

Former Director-General for Agriculture in the European Commission (1913–1978)

- Born: 1913
- Died: June 1978
- Employer: European Commission

Louis-Georges Rabot (1913 – June 1978) was a French and European civil servant who served as the first Director-General for Agriculture in the European Commission from 1958 to 1978. As such, he was one of the most important people in the development of the EU's Common Agricultural Policy, which was introduced in 1962.

Before joining the European Commission, Rabot worked at the French Ministry of Agriculture from 1944 to 1957, and most recently served as director of the international relations directorate at the ministry. He was appointed secretary-general for agriculture and alimentation in the Organisation for Economic Co-operation and Development in 1955. He became the Director-General for Agriculture in the European Commission on the insistence of the French government in 1958.

In July 1978, he was succeeded by Claude Villain as director-general.
