= Brandenburg cabinet =

Brandenburg Cabinet
- Cabinet of the Kingdom of Prussia
- 1848–1850
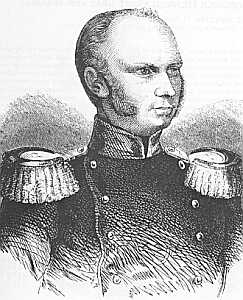
- Minister President Brandenburg
- Date formed: November 8, 1848
- Date dissolved: November 6, 1850 (1 year, 11 months and 4 weeks)

People and organisations
- King: Frederick William IV
- Minister President: Friedrich Wilhelm Brandenburg

History
- Predecessor: Pfuel cabinet
- Successor: Ladenberg cabinet

The Brandenburg Cabinet formed the Prussian State Ministry appointed by King Frederick William IV from November 8, 1848, to November 6, 1850.

== History ==
With this cabinet, Frederick William IV appointed a clear conservative, anti-revolutionary government. The Prussian National Assembly was initially moved to Brandenburg an der Havel and dissolved on December 5, 1848. The King then imposed a constitution on his own authority. The assumption of office of this cabinet marks the beginning of the "New Era" in Prussia.

== Cabinet members ==
Portfolio	Minister	Took office	Left office	Party
Minister President	Friedrich Wilhelm Brandenburg	November 8, 1848 (Note: Interim Foreign Minister from November 8, 1848, to February 22, 1849, and April 30, 1849, to July 21, 1849.)	November 6, 1850	N/A
Minister of Foreign Affairs	Heinrich Friedrich von Arnim-Heinrichsdorff-Werbelow	February 22, 1849	April 30, 1849	N/A
Minister of Foreign Affairs	Alexander von Schleinitz	July 21, 1849	September 26, 1850	N/A
Minister of Foreign Affairs	Joseph von Radowitz	September 26, 1850	November 3, 1850	N/A
Minister of Foreign Affairs	Otto Theodor von Manteuffel	November 3, 1850 (Note: Interim from November 3, 1850.)	November 6, 1850	N/A
Minister of Finance	Ludwig Samuel Kühne	November 8, 1848 (Note: Interim from November 8, 1848 to February 23, 1849.)	February 23, 1849	N/A
Minister of Finance	Rudolf von Rabe	February 23, 1849	November 6, 1850	N/A
Minister of Spiritual, Educational and Medical Affairs	Adalbert von Ladenberg	November 8, 1848	November 6, 1850	N/A
Minister of Justice	Gustav Wilhelm Kisker	November 8, 1848	November 11, 1848	N/A
Minister of Justice	Wilhelm Rintelen	November 11, 1848	April 10, 1849	N/A
Minister of Justice	Ludwig Simons	April 10, 1849	November 6, 1850	N/A
Minister of Trade, Commerce and Public Works	Adolf von Pommer Esche	November 8, 1848 (Note: Interim from November 8, 1848 to December 4, 1848.)	December 4, 1848	N/A
Minister of Trade, Commerce and Public Works	August von der Heydt	December 4, 1848	Incumbent	N/A
Minister of Interior Affairs	Otto Theodor von Manteuffel	November 8, 1848	November 6, 1850	N/A
Minister of War	Karl Adolf von Strotha	November 8, 1848	February 27, 1850	N/A
Minister of War	August von Stockhausen	February 27, 1850	November 6, 1850	N/A
Minister of Agriculture, Domains and Forestry	Otto Theodor von Manteuffel (Note: Interim Agriculture Minister while serving as Interior Minister.)	November 8, 1848	November 6, 1850	N/A

== See also ==
- Prussian State Ministry
