= Pfuel cabinet =

Prussian state ministry from September to November 1848

Pfuel Cabinet
- Cabinet of the Kingdom of Prussia
- 1848–1848
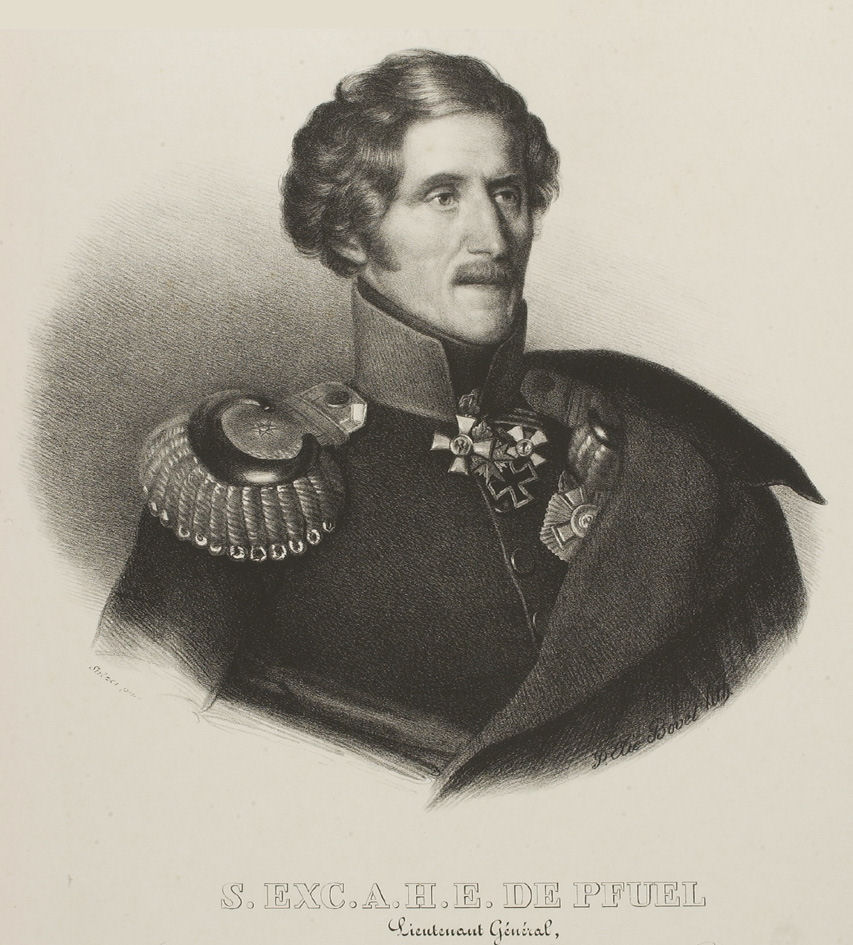
- Minister President Pfuel
- Date formed: 21 September 1848
- Date dissolved: 1 November 1848 (1 month, 1 week and 4 days)

People and organisations
- King: Frederick William IV
- Minister President: Ernst von Pfuel

History
- Predecessor: Auerswald cabinet
- Successor: Brandenburg cabinet

The Pfuel Cabinet, appointed by King Frederick William IV, formed the Prussian State Ministry from 21 September to 1 November 1848. The cabinet represented the last attempt to reach a constitutional agreement between the crown and the Prussian National Assembly. After the government resigned, the ministers continued in their positions until the Brandenburg cabinet was formed on 8 November 1848.

== Cabinet members ==
Office	Name	Notes
Minister President	Ernst von Pfuel	
Foreign Affairs	August Heinrich Hermann von Dönhoff	Interim
Finance	Gustav von Bonin	
Spiritual, Educational and Medical Affairs	Adalbert von Ladenberg	Interim
Justice	Gustav Wilhelm Kisker	
Trade, Commerce and Public Works	Gustav von Bonin	as Finance Minister
Interior Affairs	Franz August Eichmann	
War	Ludwig von Jenichen (1–8 November 1848)	
Agriculture	Franz August Eichmann	

== See also ==
- Prussian State Ministry
