= Rudolf von Auerswald =

Prussian politician (1795–1866)

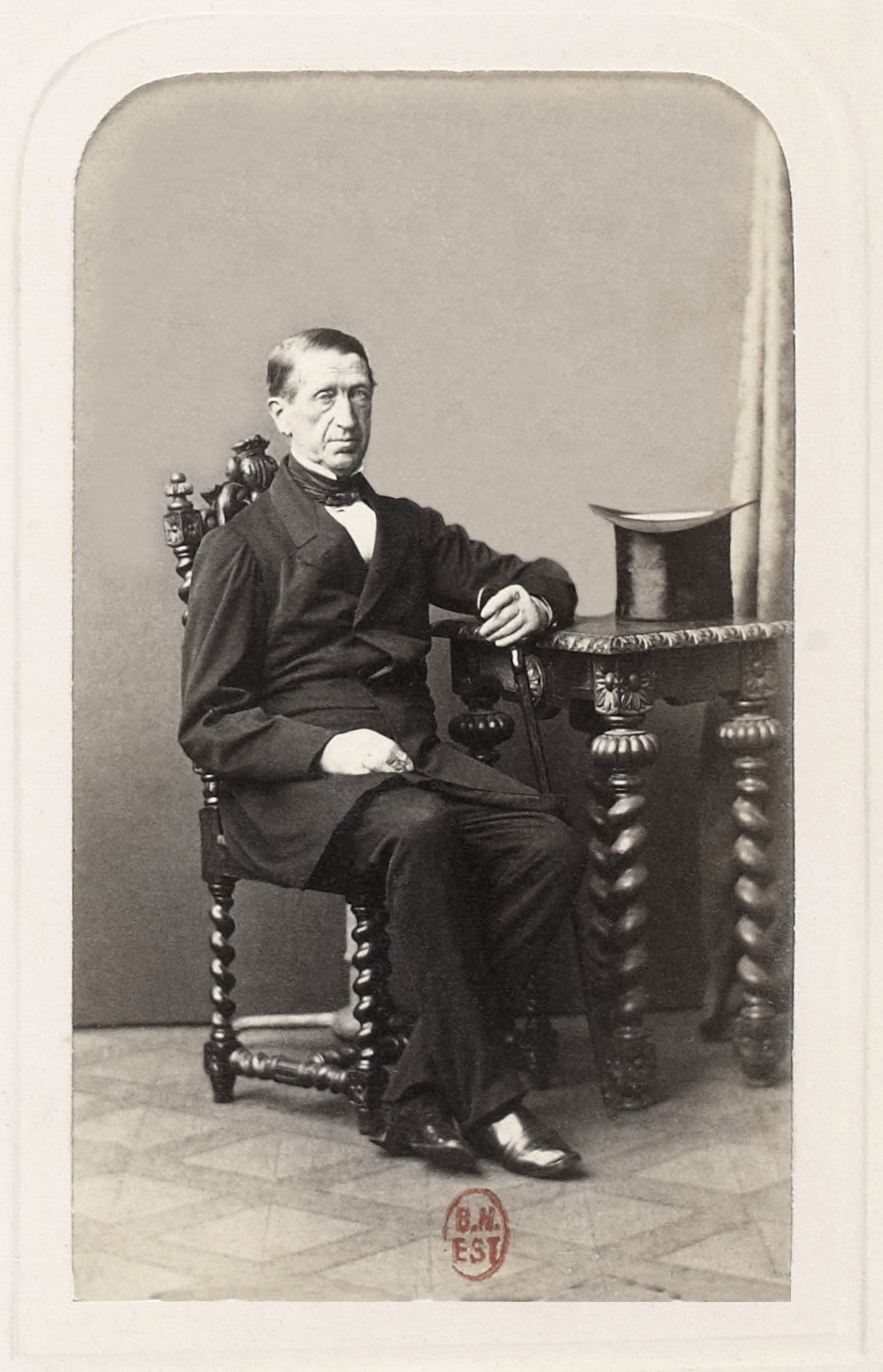
- Auerswald in 1862

3rd Minister President of Prussia
- In office 25 June 1848 – 8 September 1848
- Monarch: Frederick William IV
- Preceded by: Gottfried Ludolf Camphausen
- Succeeded by: Ernst von Pfuel

Foreign minister of Prussia
- In office 25 June – 21 September 1848
- Preceded by: Alexander von Schleinitz
- Succeeded by: August von Dönhoff

Personal details
- Born: 1 September 1795 Marienwerder, West Prussia, Kingdom of Prussia
- Died: 15 January 1866 (aged 70) Berlin, Kingdom of Prussia

Rudolf Ludwig Cäsar von Auerswald (1 September 1795 – 15 January 1866) was a German official who served as Prime Minister of Prussia during the Revolution of 1848. Later, during the ministry of Karl Anton, Prince of Hohenzollern, he led the government in all but name.

== Biography ==
Auerswald was born in Marienwerder in West Prussia (today, Kwidzyn in Poland). He was a member of a Meissen family of nobility, first mentioned in 1263, from Auerswalde, now part of Lichtenau, Saxony. His father was the official Hans Jakob von Auerswald, while his brothers were the general Hans Adolf Erdmann von Auerswald (1792–1848) and the politician Alfred von Auerswald (1797–1870).

A friend of Crown Prince William, much of Auerswald's youth was spent in Königsberg. After the completion of his education, he entered the 1st Leibhusarenregiment of the Royal Prussian Army. In 1812 as part of Napoleon's invasion of Russia, Auerswald participated in campaigns in Livonia and Courland under the command of Ludwig Yorck von Wartenburg. He also served, from 1813 to 1815, during the wars against Napoleon. Auerswald remained in the military until 1821, when he was discharged as a Rittmeister of cavalry.

Auerswald married his cousin, Countess Adela Dohna-Lauck, in 1817. After his discharge from the military, he acquired an estate in the Heiligenbeil District of East Prussia, where he was appointed Landrat (district administrator) in 1824. Auerswald became General-Landschaftsrath of the Province of Prussia in 1835 and Oberbürgermeister (lord mayor) of Königsberg in 1835.

Auerswald was a member of the knighthood of the East Prussian provincial diet, sometimes in the role of parliamentary marshal (Landtagsmarschall). During a diet paying homage to King Frederick William IV of Prussia, Auerswald was one of the politicians who reminded the new king of the 1815 promise of his predecessor, Frederick William III, to grant a constitution. Auerswald was named the Regierungspräsident of Regierungsbezirk Trier in 1842.

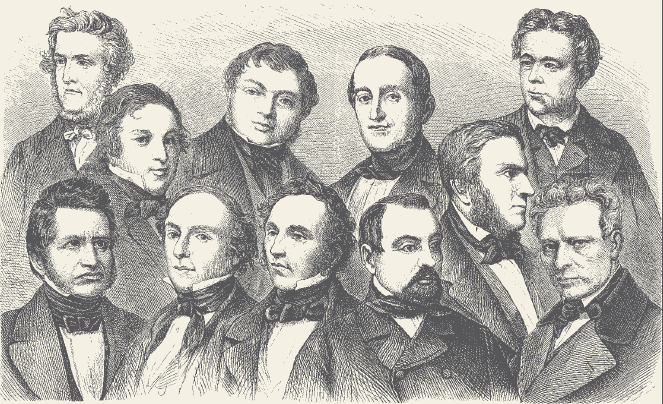
Eleven liberals: Back (l-r): Carl Mittermaier, David Hansemann, Maximilian von Schwerin-Putzar, Rudolf von Auerswald, Franz Leo Benedikt Waldeck, Friedrich Römer; Front row (l-r): Friedrich Christoph Dahlmann, Ludolf Camphausen, Hermann von Beckerath, Hermann Schulze-Delitzsch and Karl Welcker

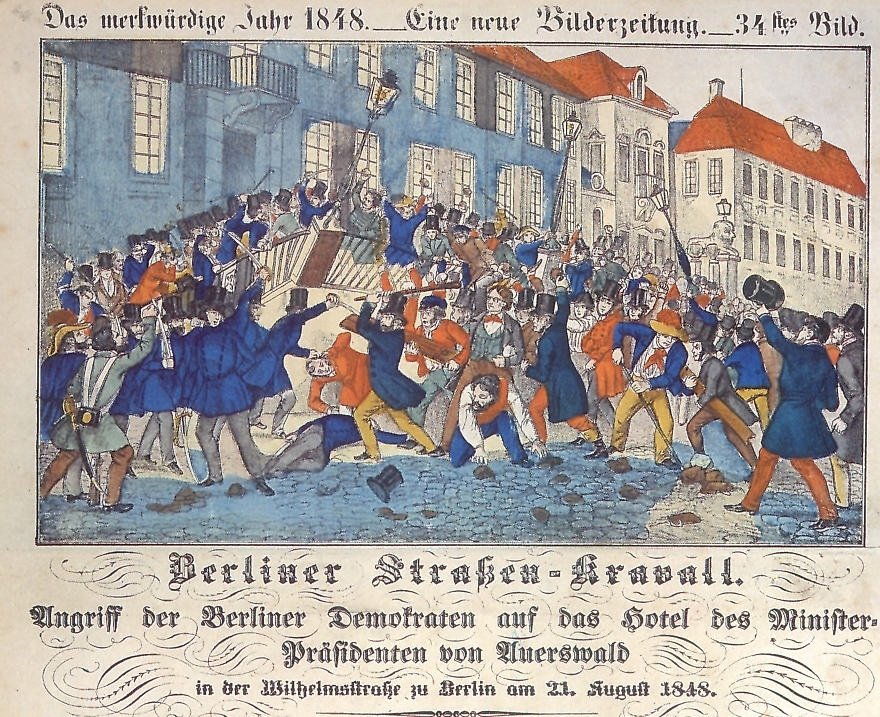
Berlin democrats attacking Prime Minister Auerswald's Wilhelmstraße hotel on 21 August 1848 (contemporary drawing)

After the outbreak of the March Revolution in 1848, Minister-president Ludolf Camphausen named Auerswald the Oberpräsident of the Province of Prussia at Königsberg. After Camphausen resigned, Auerswald succeeded him as minister-president on 25 June, as well as foreign minister. A constitution for the Kingdom of Prussia was proposed during Auerswald's term; its model was the liberal Belgian Constitution of 1831, which had strongly influenced Rhenish liberalism. However, it was not accepted by the Prussian National Assembly, which created its own constitutional committee instead. Auerswald's ministry collapsed on 8 September when the National Assembly called for the government to demand the resignation of conservative members of the military.

After his resignation, Auerswald returned to his post as Oberpräsident in Königsberg. After the dissolution of the National Assembly, the imposition of the constitution of the Kingdom of Prussia and the vote for a new parliament of Prussia led Auerswald to return to national politics. He served as president of the First Chamber (later the Prussian House of Lords) until 1850. Auerswald also participated in the Erfurt Parliament. In 1850, he was appointed Oberpräsident of the Rhine Province, but was forced to resign a year later for remarks critical of the conservative government. Auerswald then spent almost two years out of public office, traveling to Paris, Italy, and North Africa.

Auerswald became a member of the Second Chamber (the Prussian House of Representatives) in 1853 as part of the liberal opposition, owing to his friendship with Crown Prince William. After William's assumption of the Prussian regency and the end of the Manteuffel government, William named Karl Anton, Prince of Hohenzollern, as minister-president. Auerswald served as a minister without portfolio, although he led the government in all but name. Hopes for a more liberal era ended, however, in the face of resistance from the civil service, the court of Regent William and, especially, the House of Representatives.

The military budgetary crisis of 1860 brought Auerswald in opposition to his own liberal party, but he sought a middle ground between William and parliament. The inability to form a compromise caused a splintering of the liberals in 1861. The lack of a liberal majority led to the resignation of Auerswald and a number of ministers in March 1862. The next government was led by Otto von Bismarck.

Auerswald resigned from politics completely. Despite his liberal views and the defeat of the Prussian liberals, he was not disgraced, and a court position as Oberburggraf of Marienburg (Malbork) was created for him. Auerswald died in Berlin, Brandenburg.

== See also ==
- Auerswald cabinet
