= Ladenberg cabinet =

Ladenberg Cabinet
- Cabinet of the Kingdom of Prussia
- 1850–1850
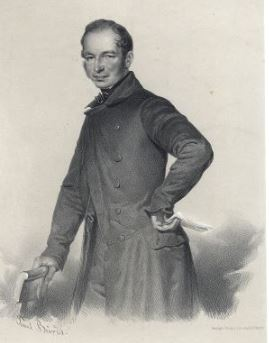
- Minister President Ladenberg
- Date formed: 9 November 1850
- Date dissolved: 4 December 1850 (3 weeks and 4 days)

People and organisations
- King: Frederick William IV
- Minister President: Adalbert von Ladenberg

History
- Predecessor: Brandenburg cabinet
- Successor: Manteuffel cabinet

The Ladenberg Cabinet formed the Prussian State Ministry appointed by King Frederick William IV from 9 November 1850 to 4 December 1850, after the death of Friedrich Wilhelm Brandenburg.

== Cabinet members ==
Office	Name	Notes
Minister President	Adalbert von Ladenberg	Interim
Foreign Affairs	Otto Theodor von Manteuffel	Interim
Finance	Rudolf von Rabe	
Spiritual, Educational and Medical Affairs	Adalbert von Ladenberg	
Justice	Ludwig Simons	
Trade, Commerce and Public Works	August von der Heydt	
Interior Affairs	Otto Theodor von Manteuffel	
War	August von Stockhausen	
Agriculture	Otto Theodor von Manteuffel	Interim

== See also ==
- Prussian State Ministry
