= Auerswald cabinet =

Auerswald Cabinet
- Cabinet of the Kingdom of Prussia
- 1848–1848
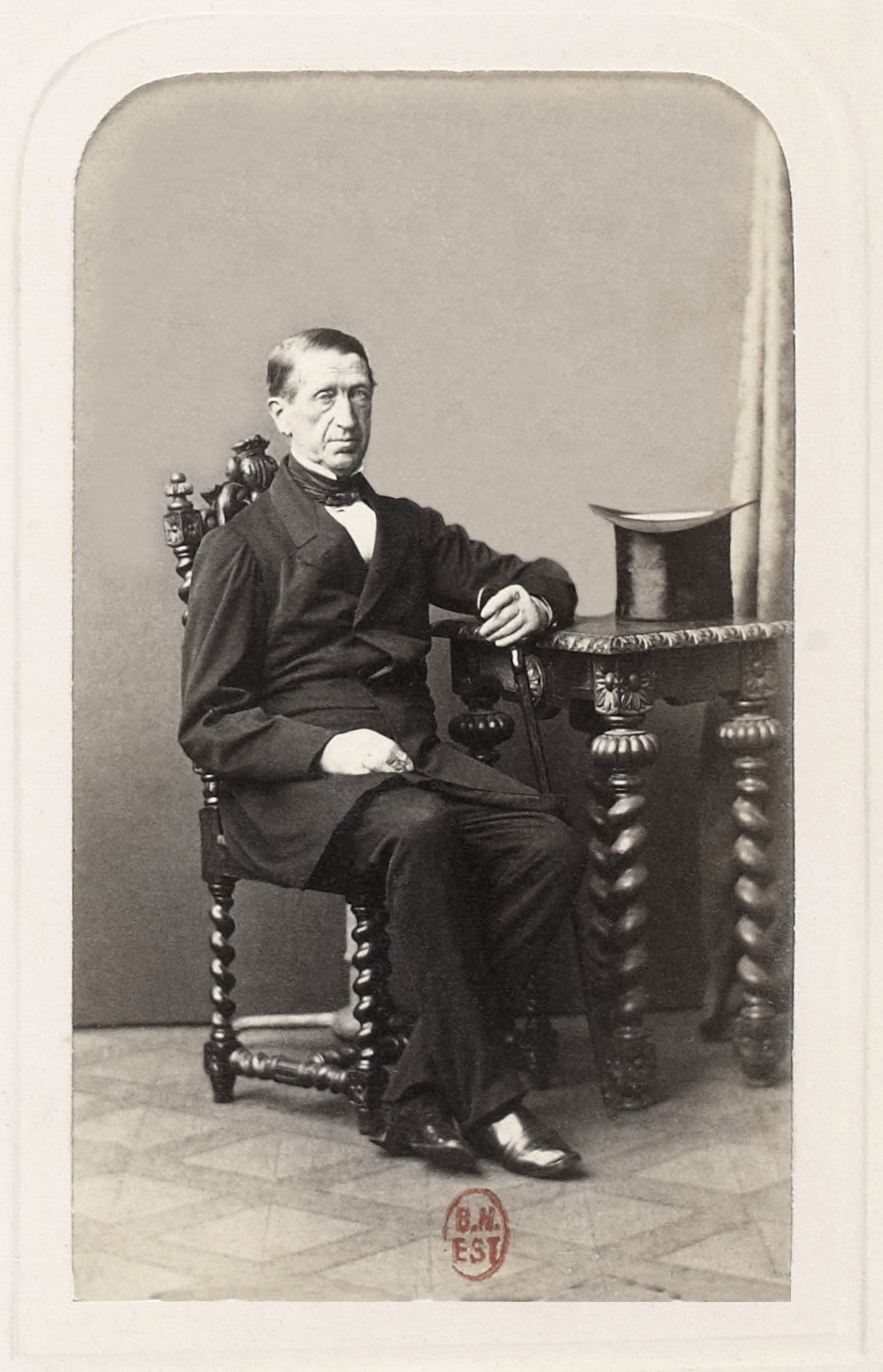
- Minister President Auerswald
- Date formed: June 25, 1848
- Date dissolved: September 21, 1848 (2 months, 3 weeks and 6 days)

People and organisations
- King: Frederick William IV
- Minister President: Rudolf von Auerswald

History
- Predecessor: Camphausen cabinet
- Successor: Pfuel cabinet

The Auerswald Cabinet formed the Prussian State Ministry appointed by King Frederick William IV from June 25 to September 21, 1848. The March government came into power with the aim of successfully ending the liberal reforms and efforts to create a constitution for Prussia initiated by the Camphausen government. She was also unable to bridge the differences between the left-wing majority in the Prussian National Assembly and the King on the constitutional question and resigned after the defeat in the vote on the implementation of Stone's proposal to combat reactionary efforts in the military.

== Cabinet members ==
Office	Name	Notes
Minister President	Rudolf von Auerswald	
Foreign Affairs	Rudolf von Auerswald	
Finance	David Hanseman	
Spiritual, Educational and Medical Affairs	Karl Rodbertus (June 25, 1848 – July 3, 1848); Adalbert von Ladenberg (interim from July 3, 1848)	
Justice	Karl Anton Maerker	
Trade, Commerce and Public Works	Karl August Milde	
Interior Affairs	Friedrich von Kühlwetter	
War	Ludwig Roth von Schockenstein	
Agriculture	Julius Gierke	

== See also ==
- Prussian State Ministry
