= August Heinrich Hermann von Dönhoff =

Prussian politician (1797–1874)

Foreign minister of Prussia
- In office 21 September – 8 November 1848
- Monarch: Frederick William IV
- Preceded by: Rudolf von Auerswald
- Succeeded by: Friedrich Wilhelm von Brandenburg

Personal details
- Born: 10 October 1797 Potsdam, Kingdom of Prussia
- Died: 1 April 1874 (aged 76) Friedrichstein Palace, East Prussia, German Empire

August Heinrich Hermann von Dönhoff (10 October 1797 in Potsdam – 1 April 1874 at Friedrichstein Palace (East Prussia)) was a Prussian diplomat.

== Career ==
Dönhoff participated as a volunteer in the campaign of 1815, studied in Königsberg, Göttingen and Heidelberg in 1816-1819 and then travelled to Italy. He began his diplomatic career in 1821 at the Prussian Foreign Ministry in Berlin, was then employed in the embassies in Paris in 1823, in Madrid in 1825, and in London in 1828, where he played a significant role in the conference on Belgium. In 1833 he was made an envoy in Munich, and in 1842 became the envoy to the Bundestag in Frankfurt am Main.

In May 1848 he resigned, but was made Foreign Minister of Prussia in September 1848 in the government of Ernst von Pfuel, a position he only held for a short time however. Then in February 1849 he was elected by the second electoral district of Gumbinnen to the first chamber of the Prussian Parliament, which sent him in 1850 to Erfurt, into the Staatenhaus (the chamber of the Erfurt Union parliament that represented the individual states). He was once again elected a member of the Prussian first chamber in the summer of 1850, and joined the moderate right-wing Partei Jordan. In 1851 he became a member of the Landtag of the province of Prussia, and participated in its session from 1851 to 1852 in Berlin. When the Prussian first chamber became the Prussian House of Lords, the King made him a hereditary member. In 1861 he became the grand-master of the wardrobe at court. He died in April 1874.

His aunt Sophie von Dönhoff was the wife of Frederick Wilhelm II.
