= Friedrich Wilhelm, Count Brandenburg =

German general and politician (1792–1850)

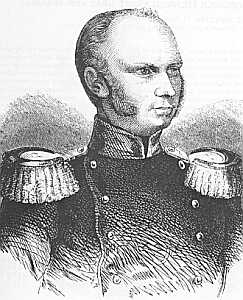
- Friedrich Wilhelm Graf von Brandenburg

Minister President of Prussia
- In office 2 November 1848 – 6 November 1850
- Monarch: Frederick William IV
- Preceded by: Ernst von Pfuel
- Succeeded by: Otto Theodor von Manteuffel

Foreign minister of Prussia
- In office 8 November – 4 December 1848
- Monarch: Frederick William IV
- Preceded by: August von Dönhoff
- Succeeded by: Hans von Bülow
- In office 30 April – 21 July 1849
- Preceded by: Heinrich Friedrich von Arnim-Heinrichsdorff-Werbelow
- Succeeded by: Alexander von Schleinitz

Personal details
- Born: 24 January 1792 Berlin, Kingdom of Prussia
- Died: 6 November 1850 (aged 58) Berlin
- Spouse: Aurora von Massenbach (m. 1818)
- Children: 8
- Parent(s): Frederick William II of Prussia; Sophie von Dönhoff

Friedrich Wilhelm, Count von Brandenburg (24 January 1792 – 6 November 1850) was a morganatic son of King Frederick William II of Prussia and politician who served as Minister President of Prussia from 1848 until his death during the reign of his nephew Frederick William IV.

== Early life ==
Born in the Prussian capital Berlin, he was the son of King Frederick William II of Prussia (1744–1797) from his morganatic marriage with Sophie von Dönhoff (1768–1838). He and his younger sister Julie (1793–1848) received the comital title von Brandenburg in 1794, and were raised with the sons of Hofmarschall Valentin von Massow. His sister married Duke Frederick Ferdinand of Anhalt-Köthen in 1816.

== Career ==
On 18 April 1806, Friedrich Wilhelm joined the Prussian Army by entering the Gardes du Corps regiment and from the next year participated in the Napoleonic War of the Fourth Coalition. In 1812 he achieved the rank of Rittmeister in the staff of Ludwig Yorck von Wartenburg, leading the Prussian auxiliary forces in support of the French invasion of Russia. In 1839 he was elevated to Lieutenant general of the VI Army Corps. By 1848, he had distinguished himself in several battles and was a cavalry general.

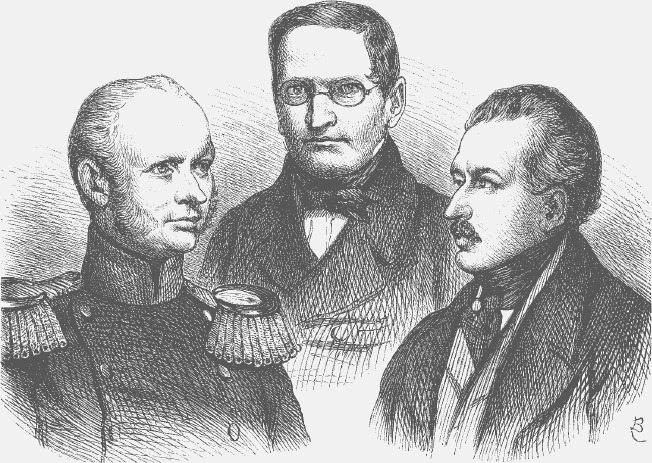
Ministers Brandenburg, Manteuffel, Radowitz

During the German revolutions of 1848–49, in November 1848, his half-nephew King Frederick William IV called him back to Berlin to succeed Ernst von Pfuel as Prussian minister president. The appointment reflected the king's intention to quell the ongoing uprisings. Jointly with Interior Minister Otto Theodor von Manteuffel, he had the Prussian National Assembly dissolved on 5 December, while on the same day the King unilaterally decreed a Constitution that kept the monarch firmly in control but that also included a catalog of fundamental rights and a parliament with a second chamber elected under universal manhood suffrage.

In October 1850, he traveled to the Warsaw Conference to meet with Czar Nicholas and sound out the Russian stance in the Austria-Prussia rivalry. Though he had initially supported the implementation of the Prussian-led Erfurt Union, he shied away from an armed conflict with Austria as State Chancellor Prince Felix of Schwarzenberg was able to strengthen the alliance with the Russian Empire isolating the Prussian side. After his return, Friedrich Wilhelm spoke out against mobilising the Prussian Army as advocated by Foreign Minister Joseph von Radowitz. Shortly afterwards, he took seriously ill and died, it is said from the humiliation of the Czar's abandonment of the Erfurt policy. He was buried in the crypt of Berlin Cathedral.

== Personal life ==
On 24 May 1818 Count von Brandenburg married Mathilde Aurora von Massenbach (1795–1885) in Potsdam. They had eight children:

- Friedrich (1819–1892), who was a Prussian general.
- Wilhelm (1819–1892), who was a Prussian general.
- Friedrich Wilhelm Gustav (1820–1909), who was Prussian envoy in Brussels and Lisbon.
- Wilhelmine Charlotte Friederike Julie Alexandrine (1821–1902), honorary lady in Heiligengrabe.
- Luise Julie (1823–1884), honorary lady in Heiligengrabe.
- Friederike Wilhelmine Elisabeth Mathilde (1825–1900), who married Maj. Erdmann Alexander Georg von Pückler in 1847.
- Friederike Wilhelmine Georgine Elisabeth (1828–1893)
- Alexandra Friederike Wilhelmine Marianne (1834–1885), who was a lady-in-waiting of the Empress Augusta.

Count von Brandenburg died on 6 November 1850 in Berlin.

== See also ==
- Brandenburg cabinet
