= Constitution of Prussia (1848) =

First constitution of the Kingdom of Prussia, promulgated by Frederick William IV in 1848

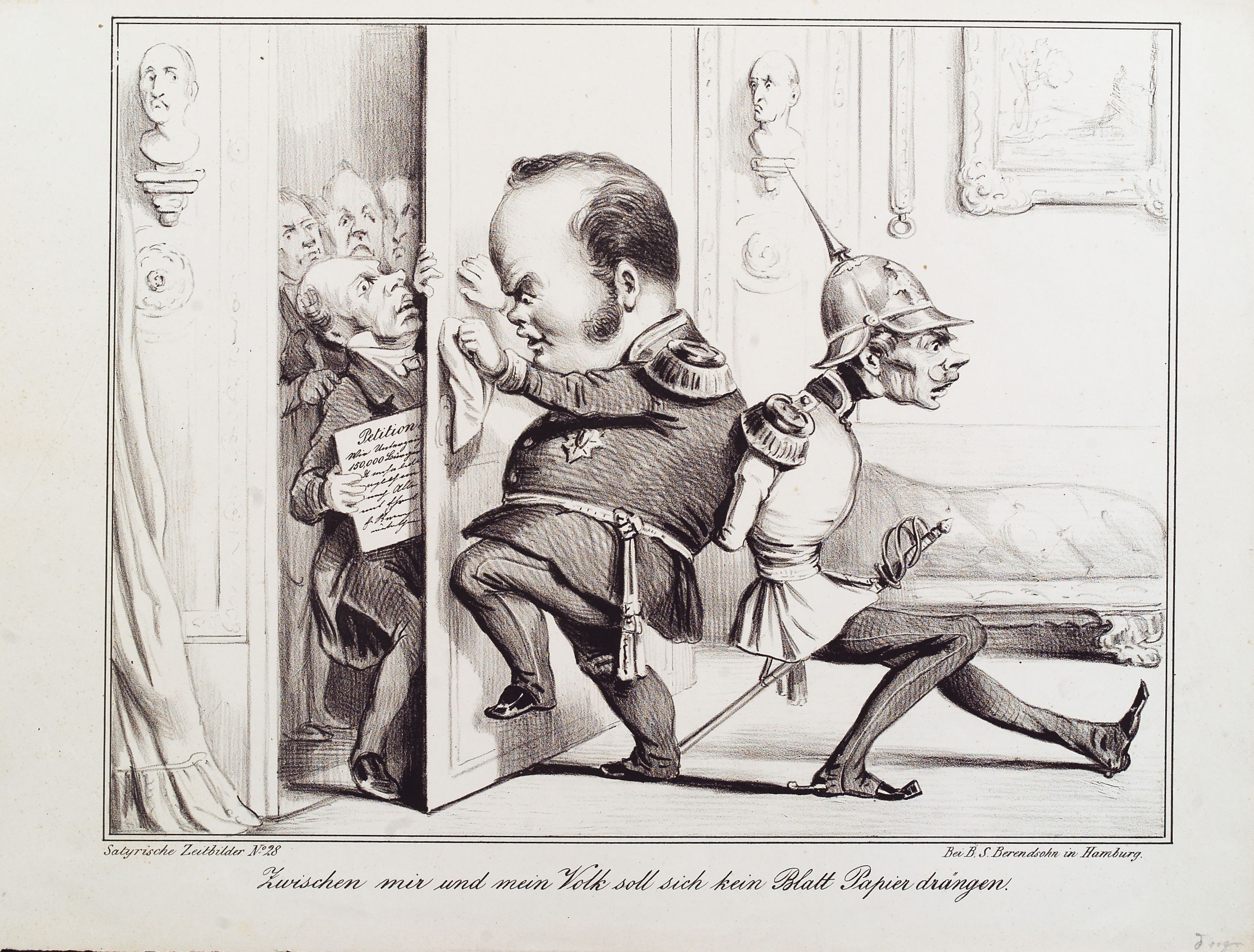
Caricature in the Satyrische Zeitbilder No. 28 of 1848 showing King Frederick William IV and Marshal Friedrich von Wrangel, commander-in-chief of the Prussian army, trying to close the door on delegates carrying the Constitution. The caption reads, "No sheet of paper shall come between me and my people."

The 1848 Constitution of Prussia was imposed on the Kingdom of Prussia by King Frederick William IV on 5 December 1848 in response to demands that arose during the German revolutions of 1848–1849. Although the Constitution was not the result of an agreement between the King and the Prussian National Assembly as originally intended, it included a list of fundamental rights, the introduction of jury courts, limitations on the monarch's powers and a mandate to ensure legal certainty.

In spite of the liberal clauses in the Constitution, Prussia was still far from a democratic state. The king had an absolute veto over laws, which restricted the separation of powers. It was possible for the monarch to circumvent the judiciary, and the military could be described as a state within the state. All adult male citizens regardless of class had the right to vote, but the three-class franchise that weighted votes based on the amount of taxes paid significantly limited the political voice of the middle and lower classes.

Although amended many times, the basic framework of the 1848 Prussian Constitution remained in place until 1918, encompassing the periods when Prussia was part of the North German Confederation (1866–1871) and the German Empire (1871–1918).

== Historical framework ==
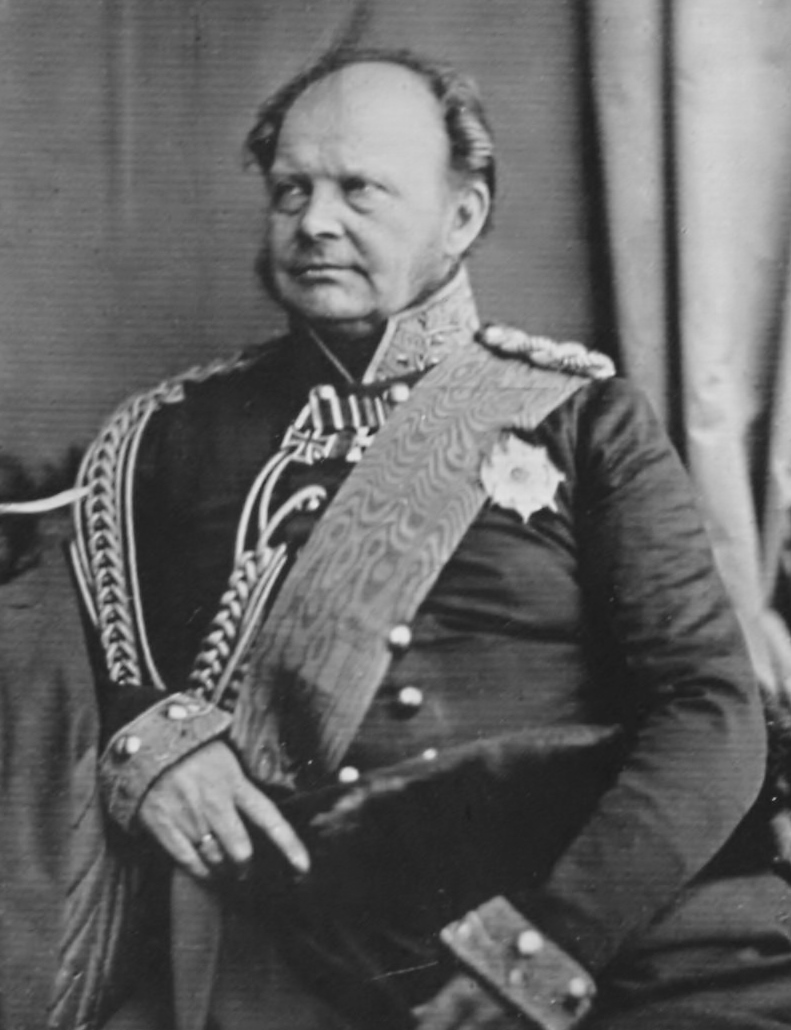
King Frederick William IV in 1847

Article 13 of the 1815 Constitution of the German Confederation stipulated that each member state of the Confederation should have its own constitution "based on the Landstände ('estates' or 'diets' of the land). The drafting of a constitution for Prussia was delayed due to the opposition of the Prussian kings Frederick William III, whose constitutional promises of 1810 and 1815 remained unfulfilled, and Frederick William IV, who invoked his divine right.

The Constitution of 1848 was a reaction to the events of the revolutions of 1848–1849 in Germany in general and Berlin in particular. Until mid-March 1848, Prussia – in contrast to other German states and especially to France – was "caught up in the revolutionary movement only in subregions". In order to prevent a revolution, the King initially pursued a policy of small concessions to the liberal spirit of the times, including the promise made on 6 March 1848 to periodically convene the State Parliament.

On 18 March Berlin's democrats called for a large demonstration. Under the pressure of events, Frederick William IV granted freedom of the press, issued an edict for an "accelerated convening of the United State Parliament", and called for far-reaching liberal reforms. In spite of the concessions, the demonstration turned violent, and when Prussian soldiers intervened, a barricade battle ensued. The King was forced to announce on 19 March that after the barricades were removed, "all streets and squares are to be immediately cleared of troops".

The Kingdom of Prussia in 1818 (dark blue). Its boundaries were essentially the same when the 1848 Constitution was imposed by King Frederick William IV.

In a proclamation of 22 March, the King promised far-reaching concessions. He instructed the Prussian National Assembly to submit a draft constitution for discussion. The Assembly was elected indirectly under the same electoral law that was used for the Prussian representatives to the Frankfurt Parliament: all men above the age of 24 in full possession of their civic rights and who were not on poor relief could vote for electors who in turn chose the representatives for the assembly. There was, however, little cooperation between the National Assembly and the Royal Prussian Ministry because of the different ideas that the two sides held. On 26 July the National Assembly nevertheless submitted its draft constitution, the so-called "Charte Waldeck", which among other things called for restricting the royal veto. It would have meant Prussia's transition to a constitutional monarchy, and, as "the King declare[d] to the Minister President ... 'he would never accept [it] under any conditions'".

Over the following months as the strength of the revolution waned, the influence of the reactionary forces around the King increased, as was shown by the appointment against the will of the National Assembly of conservative Count Friedrich Wilhelm of Brandenburg as successor to Minister President Ernst von Pfuel. On 9 November the National Assembly was adjourned "for its own safety" and moved to Brandenburg an der Havel.

On 5 December, after his government, especially Interior Minister Otto Theodor von Manteuffel, had significantly revised the previous drafts, King Frederick William IV unilaterally imposed a constitution that, to the surprise of the population, adopted many liberal positions and closely followed the Waldeck Charter. The National Assembly was then dissolved. After the election of the new Parliament, it and the King by mutual agreement amended parts of the 1848 document and re-issued it as the Prussian Constitution of 1850.

== Provisions in the constitutional text ==
Note: in the references to the constitutional articles below, the first number refers to the 1848 Constitution, the second to the 1850 version. In some cases there are differences of detail between the articles, and there is not always an article in the1850 Constitution that corresponds to any in the first document.

=== Fundamental rights (Title II) ===
The fundamental rights of the Prussian Constitution of 1848 were exclusively civil rights. The conditions for acquiring and losing citizenship were determined by law – that is, not part of the Constitution itself (Art. 3 / 3). Article 9 / 10 prohibited the loss of civic rights by a judge's decision after a crime had been committed ("civil death").

The following rights – many with certain limited restrictions – were guaranteed:

- equality before the law, with privileges of status banned (Art. 4 / 4);
- the inviolability of the home and secrecy of correspondence (Art. 6 / 6 );
- freedom of speech and the press, with censorship forbidden (Art. 24–26 / 27–28);
- freedom of assembly indoors without notification; restrictions on open-air assemblies subject to law (Art. 27 / 29);
- the inviolability of property, limited only by deprivation or restriction for reasons of public welfare, with compulsory compensation payable to the injured party (Art. 8 / 9);
- unconditional right to a "legal judge"; only ordinary courts could impose punishments, in accordance with an existing law (Art. 7 / 7);
- general, free and compulsory education in public schools (Art. 18–19 / 21–22);
- free choice and practice of religion, as well as the right to unite in religious or other societies. The state guaranteed all civic rights regardless of the individual's religion, but the practice of religion could not interfere with civic duties. All religious societies (with special emphasis on the Protestant and Roman Catholic Churches in the constitutional text) exercised their rights, such as filling ecclesiastical posts, autonomously (Art. 11–15 / 12–18).

In the event of "war or insurrection ... on a temporary and district basis", personal liberty, the inviolability of the home, the secrecy of correspondence, the right to a lawful judge, freedom of expression, freedom of the press, freedom of assembly, and the right of association in societies could be suspended on the basis of Article 110 / 111.

=== Legislature and chambers (Title V) ===
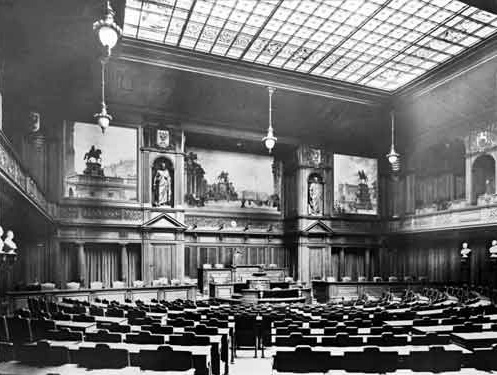
Meeting chamber of the Prussian House of Lords, circa 1900

The 180 members of the first (upper) chamber of the Prussian Parliament, later called the House of Lords (Preußisches Herrenhaus), were men who had been citizens for at least five years and were over the age of 40. They were indirectly elected for 6-year terms by male Prussian citizens who were at least thirty years old and paid an "annual class tax of at least eight thalers, or proved ownership of real estate worth at least 5,000 thalers, or had an annual income of five hundred thalers". Provincial, district and county representatives served as electors (Art. 63 / _).

The second (lower) chamber, the House of Representatives (Abgeordnetenhaus), consisted of 350 members who had to be at least 30 years old and to have been Prussian citizens for at least one year. Every "independent" (Art. 67 / 70) male Prussian citizen who did not receive poor relief was entitled to vote for them. An "Election Implementation Act" (Art. 73 / _) was to determine additional details of the election. The legislative period lasted three years (Art. 70 / 73). The deputies acted as "representatives of the whole people" (Art. 82 / 83).

The members of both chambers had a free mandate, meaning that they voted "according to their free conviction" (Art. 82 / 83). At the same time, they were obliged to "swear allegiance and obedience to the King and the Constitution" (Art. 107 / 108).

Legislation was the responsibility of the king and both chambers (Art. 60 / 62). Because the king took part in legislation, the principle of separation of powers was realized only to a limited extent, since he simultaneously held executive power (Art. 43 / 45) and had the right to appoint the judiciary (Art. 86 / 87).

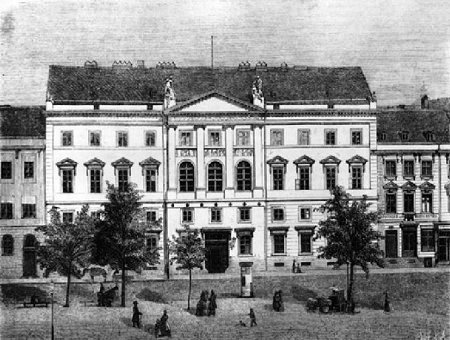
Palais Hardenberg in Berlin. It was the seat of the Prussian House of Representatives until 1899.

Interdependence of powers (the right of one branch to intervene in another in order to exercise effective checks and balances) existed between the legislative and executive branches only to a limited degree, since ministers, although answerable to Parliament (Art. 58 / 60) were not dependent on it through appointment or dismissal. Per article 105 / 63, when the chambers were not in session, the king could "in urgent cases, under the responsibility of the whole Ministry of State [which was dependent on the king by dismissal (Art. 43 / 45)], issue decrees having the force of law", but the decree "must be submitted to the chambers for approval at their next meeting [which the king could postpone for 60 days by dissolving one or both chambers]" (Art. 49 / 51).

The king had to convene both chambers simultaneously. They were "opened, adjourned (for 30 days and only once per session), and closed" by the king alone; in addition, he could dissolve both chambers, or one chamber at any time, and have them reelected after a maximum of 40 days and reconvened after a maximum of 60 days (Art. 49 / 51). The chambers were required to be convened in November of each year (Art. 75 / 76).

Legislative initiative rested with the king and the two chambers (Art. 60 / 62). The same bill could be proposed only once per session (Art. 61 / 64). After being convened, the chambers decided on their own bills at the initiative of the president of the chamber or at least 10 members in a secret session, or they voted, according to the principle of absolute majority, on bills proposed by the king or the other chamber. To hold a vote, a majority of the members of a chamber had to be present (Art. 79 / 80). To enact a law, all three parties (the king and both chambers) had to agree (Art. 60 / 62). Both chambers and the king thus had what amounted to the right to veto new laws by withholding consent. The Constitution itself was amendable "through the ordinary channels of legislation" (Art. 106 / 107).

The chambers separately decided on the course of business and the rules of procedure as well as the election of the chamber's president, vice-president and secretary, and on decisions concerning members (Art. 77 / 78). They could also address writs to the king (Art. 80 / 81) and form commissions of inquiry (Art. 81 / 82).

To be valid, a law that was passed had to have been "promulgated in the form prescribed by law" (Art. 105 / 63 and 106). Promulgation of laws was the king's responsibility (Art. 43 / 45). Theoretically, by delaying a law's promulgation, the king could indefinitely postpone its binding force.

=== Executive and administration (Titles III, IV) ===
The supreme executive body was the king, who swore an oath to the Constitution at the beginning of his reign (Art. 52 / 54). The oath characterized post-1848 Prussia as a constitutional monarchy, although the preamble followed the absolutist claim to power: "We Frederick William, by the grace of God". The king had immunity: "The person of the king is inviolable" (Art. 41 / 43). The king had the right, without the involvement of either legislative chamber, "to declare war, make peace, and establish treaties with foreign governments" (Art. 46 / 48). The consent of the chambers was required for rule over a foreign country and for the conclusion of commercial treaties or other contracts that had an impact on or obligated the state or its citizens (Art. 46 / 48). Foreign policy was thus largely removed from parliamentary control. The king alone had the right to mint coins (Art. 48 / 50). The throne passed to the king's eldest son (Art. 51 / 53). Unless "provision has been made for both by a special law" beforehand, both chambers determined the regency and guardianship of the king in the event of his minority (under the age of 18) or his incapacity to govern (Art. 54–56 / 56–58).

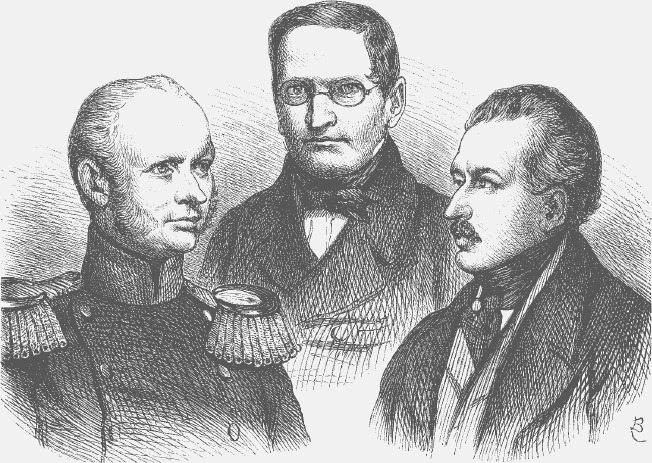
Three key ministers under King Frederick William IV: Count Friedrich Wilhelm von Brandenburg, Baron Otto Theodor von Manteuffel, both of whom served as minister president, and Joseph von Radowitz, who became foreign minister in 1851.

Subordinate to the king were his ministers, over whose appointment, dismissal and number he could freely determine (Art. 43 / 45). Ministers were answerable to the chambers of Parliament and were obliged to provide information on appeals they received (Art. 80 / 81). Their presence could be requested by a chamber at any time, (Art. 58 / 60) and they were required to be heard by the chambers if they themselves requested it (Art. 58 / 60). They could be "indicted by resolution of a chamber for the crimes of constitutional violation, bribery or treason" (Art. 59 / 61). The Supreme Court decided on the charges.

The state's financial management and budget were subject to extensive parliamentary control. The budget was determined by law one year in advance (Art. 98 / 99). Since taxes and duties could be levied only by inclusion in the state budget or by law (Art. 99 / 100), their levying was constitutional only with the consent of the king and both chambers. The raising of state bonds and state guarantees also required the consent of the three legislative bodies (Art. 102 / 103). "Preferential treatment" in taxation was not permitted (Art. 100 / 101). The Chief Chamber of Accounts (Ober-Rechnungskammer) examined the budget for the previous year and submitted it to the chambers, which had to accept the government's actions and give subsequent approval in the event of a budget overrun (Art. 103 / 104). The consent of both chambers was thus required for all important state budgetary decisions.

The territorial authorities of Prussia were provinces, districts, counties and municipalities. They formed the foundations for subsidiarity (handling issues at the most immediate local level) in the Prussian state. The "assemblies consisting of elected representatives" "decide on the internal and special affairs of the provinces, districts, counties and municipalities", i.e. they could decide their own affairs independently. Under what conditions "the decisions of the municipal, district, county, and provincial assemblies [were] subject to the approval of a higher representative body or the state government" was determined by statute. Local authorities had to account for their budgets to the state government. The administration of the local police in cities under 30,000 inhabitants was also subject to the municipality (Art. 104 / 105).

Like the heads of the territorial authorities, with the exception of municipalities, whose heads were "elected by the members of the municipality" (Art. 104 / _), all positions in the civil service were generally filled by the king (Art. 45 / 47). Civil servants "shall swear allegiance and obedience to the King and the Constitution" (Art. 107 / 108). Consideration was to be given to the civil service status of public servants, and they were to be "afforded adequate protection against arbitrary deprivation of office and income" (Art. 96 / 98). Civil servants who were employed prior to the enactment of the Constitution were to be protected in the same manner. All civil servants were to be prosecuted in court for "violations of the law committed by exceeding their official powers". No prior authorization was required (Art. 95 / 97), which made civil servants equal to any citizen in cases of legal prosecution.

=== Judiciary (Title VI) ===
Judicial power was exercised in the name of the king (Art. 85 / 86). He had the right to appoint all judges, whose terms were for life, but he did not have the right to dismiss them. Once in office, judges were therefore independent in their decisions. They could be removed from office, transferred or retired by the decision of a judge on grounds established by law (Art. 86 / 87). Also determined by law were the requirements for working as a judge, such as the necessary education (Art. 89 / 90), and the exceptions to Articles 87 / 88, which stated that a judge could not hold another salaried state office.

The king was vested with the right to issue pardons and mitigate sentences without involving the courts (Art. 47 / 49). The pardon or mitigation of sentences of impeached ministers required the consent of the impeaching chamber (Art. 47 / 49).

The organization and regulations of the jurisdictions and the competencies of the individual courts were not regulated in the Constitution but with reference to corresponding laws (Art. 88 / 89). The two existing supreme courts were combined into one (Art. 91 / 92).

In principle, unless otherwise determined by a public judgment due to danger to state security and order, criminal and civil trials proceeded in public (Art. 92 / 93). Juries were to be used in cases of serious crimes, political offenses and press offenses (Art. 93 / 94).

=== Military and citizen army ===
War ensign of Prussia

The Prussian army consisted of "the standing army, the Landwehr [a citizens' militia] and the Bürgerwehr" (home guard) (Art. 33 / 35). All Prussian men were subject to military service (Art. 32 / 34).

The armed forces remained under the command of the king, who had "supreme command over the army" (Art. 44 / 46); there was no parliamentary control over it. During "war and in service", it was subject to "military criminal jurisdiction", and when not, while retaining military criminal jurisdiction, it was subject to the "general criminal laws" (Art. 36 / 37).The general laws thus had only limited validity in the military, and basic rights were restricted. The fundamental rights to personal liberty, inviolability of the home, secrecy of correspondence, freedom of assembly and free association in societies applied to the military, but only to the extent that those rights did not conflict with "military disciplinary regulations" (Art. 32 / 39). The use of the army domestically for the "suppression of internal unrest and the execution of the laws" was regulated in a law; deployments had to be ordered by civil authorities (Art. 34 / 36). The standing army was not allowed to "deliberate". The Landwehr could not discuss military orders and instructions even when not called to service (Art. 37 / 38).

=== Provisions on land ownership (fiefs and entailments) ===
Fiefs and entailments, two legal forms of organizing land ownership, were banned in the Prussian Constitution after criticism of entailments in particular had "awakened with the rise of liberalism". Existing fiefs and entailments were dissolved (Art. 38 / 40). The "right to freely dispose of landed property" was subject to "no restrictions other than those of general legislation" (Art. 40 / 42). The "fiefs of the throne" and "the royal house and princely entail" were an exception to the prohibition of such legal relationships. They were to be "ordered by special laws" (Art. 39 / 41). Many rights of the former landlords were abolished without compensation, including judicial lordship (Gerichtsherrlichkeit), manorial police, hereditary servitude and "tax and trade charters" (Art. 40 / 42).

=== Transitional provisions ===
All laws, ordinances, taxes, duties and authorities compatible with the Constitution remained in force (Art. 108–109 / 109–110). "Immediately after the first meeting of the chambers", a revision of the Constitution was to take place through the ordinary channels of legislation (Art. 112 / _). Articles 111 / 118 concerned a possible constitution for all of Germany. In the event that it should require changes to the Prussian Constitution, "the king shall order them and ... communicate them to the chambers". The chambers were to "pass a resolution on whether the provisional amendments [as ordered by the king] were in accordance with the German Constitution" (Art. 111 / 118). The initiative for a constitutional amendment in support of a German constitution thus lay solely with the king, and not, as with any other constitutional amendment, with all three legislative bodies.

=== The three-class franchise ===
The 1848 Constitution spoke of an "Election Implementation Law" that would "determine the details of the execution of the elections to both chambers" (Art. 73 / _). "Whether another mode of election, namely that of the division according to certain classes ... is not preferable" was also posited for consideration for the time at which the Constitution was revised (Art. 67 / _). For the second chamber (lower house), instead of a law passed by the three legislative bodies, the King issued the "Ordinance on Conducting the Election of Deputies to the Second Chamber of 30 May 1849". To justify his action, he referred to Article 105 / 63 of the Constitution, which allowed emergency decrees with the force of law: "If the Houses are not in session, decrees with the force of law may be issued in urgent cases under the responsibility of the entire Ministry of State, but they shall be submitted immediately to the Houses for approval at their next session." His justification for the introduction of suffrage ranked according to tax classes (the three-class franchise) was the distinction between the "powers of citizenship", which he said are "partly physical or material, partly mental". The greater the civic power, the higher weight of the electoral vote should be. Another reason he put forth was that "the poorer members of society tend to have the greater sum of physical powers, the richer members the higher measure of intellectual force, and thus the weight, which one apparently attaches to material fortune, in fact comes with the higher intelligence."

== Comparison with the demands of the March Revolution ==
The "Mannheim Petition" had summarized the basic demands that nearly all liberal and democratic-minded revolutionaries included in their programs. The key points were an armed people, jury courts, a German parliament and freedom of the press, all of which were to be guaranteed in a constitution. These demands, possibly supplemented by freedom of assembly, were the core demands of the March Revolution.

The simple existence of a constitution, even one with absolutist claims to rule, showed that Prussia had taken a major step towards the principle that governmental authority is derived from a body of law. The king's power was limited by a Constitution that contained progressive clauses concerning such fundamental rights as freedom of the press and freedom of assembly. Those and other basic rights could, however, be suspended in the event of an emergency. The new Constitution did meet the revolutionary demand for jury courts: juries decided in cases of serious crimes and political or press offenses. An armed populace was not adopted in the Constitution, although a citizens' militia and general conscription were introduced, not independently, however, but subject to military orders. Their existence to a certain extent counterbalanced the power of the standing army. As for the demand for a national parliament for all of Germany, when the Frankfurt Parliament offered King Frederick William IV the German crown on 3 April 1849, he refused it. Amendments to the Prussian Constitution in support of a German constitution were also subject to his initiative.

The Constitution made concessions to liberal demands on many points. The democratic shortcomings of the Constitution lay primarily in the inadequate separation and control of powers, the king's right to issue emergency decrees, the undermining of the judiciary by the king, his ability to dissolve the chambers of Parliament and in their mode of election.

== 1850 revision ==
The first Parliament under the 1848 Constitution revised it as required in Article 112. The 1850 Constitution came into force on 31 January 1850 and lasted (with a considerable number of changes) until 1918. It expired with the November Revolution of 1918 and was replaced by the new, democratic 1920 Constitution of the Free State of Prussia.
