= Heinrich Alexander von Arnim =

Prussian statesman (1798–1861)

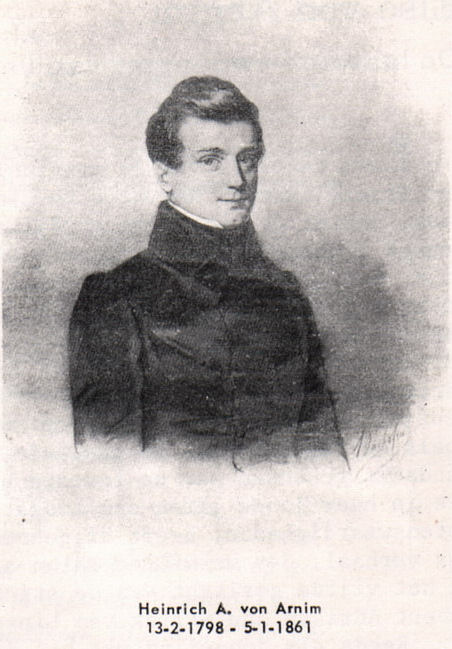

Foreign minister of Prussia
- In office 21 March – 19 June 1848
- Monarch: Frederick William IV
- Preceded by: Adolf Heinrich von Arnim-Boitzenburg
- Succeeded by: Alexander von Schleinitz

Personal details
- Born: 13 February 1798 Berlin, Kingdom of Prussia
- Died: 5 January 1861 (aged 62) Düsseldorf, Kingdom of Prussia

Heinrich Alexander (from 1841 Freiherr) von Arnim(-Suckow) (born 13 February 1798 in Berlin; died 5 January 1861 in Düsseldorf) was a Prussian statesman.

== Life ==
Arnim received his education in the Pädagogium in Halle, then in 1814 joined the cavalry of the Landwehr of the Uckermark and fought with five brothers in the War of the Sixth Coalition. He joined the Prussian civil service in 1820, he was at first an embassy attaché in Switzerland, then a legation secretary in Munich, Copenhagen and Naples and was made chargé d'affaires in Darmstadt in 1829. There, he successfully worked towards the creation of the Zollverein, after which he was made an Expert Councillor (Vortragender Rat) in the Foreign Ministry in 1834. However, Frederick William IV, with whom he was in close personal contact, made him an envoy in Brussels in 1840, and in Paris in 1846.

In these positions he earned much credit through resolutely defending German trade interests, namely by bringing about the Belgo-Prussian trade agreement of 1 September 1844 and through the determination with which he confronted the prevailing protectionist attitudes, publicly and officially as well as through his work Mein handelspolitisches Testament (translation: My Legacy in Trade Policy) (Berlin 1844).

After the end of the July Monarchy (February 1848), he hurried to Berlin and on 17 March handed the King a memorandum, in which he advocated liberal reforms and the pursuing of a German national policy. He was behind the King's momentous declaration of support for the German cause (21 March). On the same day he took office as Foreign Minister of Prussia in the government that was led first by Adolf Heinrich von Arnim-Boitzenburg, then by Gottfried Ludolf Camphausen; this government already resigned on 20 June, however.

Arnim then lived for a while as a private citizen in Neuwied and endeavored to work towards a moderate solution to the German question, through various pamphlets (Frankfurt und Berlin, Frankfurt 1848; Über die Mediatisationsfrage, Frankfurt 1849). He was a member of the first chamber of the Prussian Parliament from 1849 to 1851, and supported the German-Constitutional party. He vigorously opposed the domestic as well as the feeble foreign policy of the now victorious reactionaries in the most dynamic way possible. An even greater impression than his speeches and petitions was made by the publication of various "undelivered" speeches (Zur Politik der Epigonen in Preußen, Berlin 1850; Zur Politik der Konterrevolution in Preußen, Berlin 1851). Due to this last pamphlet Arnim was prosecuted in court at the instigation of the feudal party, and despite a stellar defence that he later published, he was convicted and sentenced to pay a fine. After that he stayed clear of the political stage, until after the downfall of the government of Otto von Manteuffel in 1858 he was elected by a Berlin constituency to the Landtag. His sickliness however prevented him from devoting his whole energy to the new era of Prussian public life that was then just beginning. He died on 5 January 1861 in Düsseldorf. A broad body of knowledge, worldly wisdom and frankness secured him a significant personal reputation from early on.

== Sources ==
- Jochen Lengemann: Das Deutsche Parlament (Erfurter Unionsparlament) von 1850. Ein Handbuch: Mitglieder, Amtsträger, Lebensdaten, Fraktionen, Urban und Fischer, Jena 2000, pp. 64–66. ISBN 343731128X
- Bernd Haunfelder: "Biographisches Handbuch für das Preußische Abgeordnetenhaus 1849–1867", in: Handbücher zur Geschichte des Parlamentarismus und der politischen Parteien. Bd. 5, Droste, Düsseldorf 1994, p. 48. ISBN 3770051815
- Heinz Gollwitzer: "Arnim-Suckow, Alexander Heinrich Freiherr von". In: Neue Deutsche Biographie. (NDB). Band 1. Duncker & Humblot, Berlin 1953, ISBN 3428001826, pp. 368–369 (online at deutsche-biographie.de).
- Carl Wippermann: "Arnim-Suckow, Alexander Freiherr von". In: Allgemeine Deutsche Biographie (ADB). Band 1, Duncker & Humblot, Leipzig 1875, pp. 571–574 (online at de.wikisource)
