= Otto von Manteuffel =

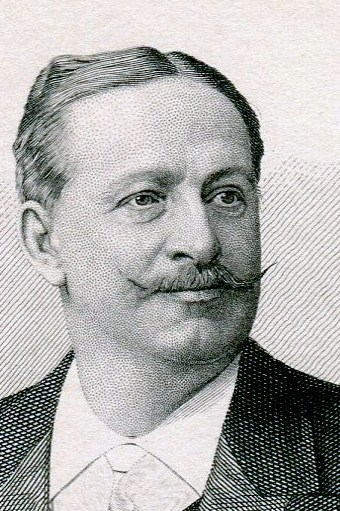

Member of the Reichstag
- In office 1877–1898

Member of the Prussian House of Lords
- In office 1883–1913

Personal details
- Born: 29 November 1844; Berlin, Prussia
- Died: 4 March 1913 (aged 68); Berlin, Germany
- Political party: German Conservative Party

Otto Karl Gottlob Freiherr von Manteuffel (29 November 1844 – 4 March 1913) was a German landowner and politician who served as a member of the Reichstag for the German Conservative Party between 1877 and 1898.

== Biography ==
Born in Berlin in 1844, Manteuffel was the son of the Prussian Prime Minister Otto Theodor von Manteuffel and his wife Berta (née von Stammer), and the nephew of Prussian Minister of Agriculture Karl Otto von Manteuffel. He studied law at the University of Göttingen and the Martin Luther University Halle-Wittenberg.

He took part in the Austro-Prussian War as a lieutenant in the 12th Hussar Regiment. From 1872 to 1889 Manteuffel was a Landrat in Luckau. He was also a member of the Brandenburg provincial parliament and the Lower Lusatian Municipal Parliament. Manteuffel was also a member of the General Synod and the Provincial Synod for Brandenburg. He was chairman of the Evangelical Aid Society and general director of the Land-Fire Association for Kurmark and Lower Lusatia. In 1872 he married Helene Johanne Luise Isidore von Brandenstein adH Zöschen (1847–1934) in Merseburg. The couple did not have any children.

From 1877 to 1898 Manteuffel was a member of the Reichstag for the German Conservative Party. Between 1892 and 1897 he was parliamentary group leader. From 1883 he was also a member of the House of Lords Prussian House of Lords; in 1891 he was its first vice-president.

Manteuffel played a central role in the German Conservative Party, especially after the Tivoli Party Congress in 1892, at which anti-Semitic program points were decided, among other things. He was chairman of the German Conservative Party until 1911. Manteuffel was also chairman of the Brandenburg Provincial Parliament and the Lower Lusatian Municipal Parliament in 1894. In 1896 his land holdings around Krossen, Drahnsdorf, Falkenhayn and Schäcksdorf near Luckau included were at least 2,000 hectares in size.

Between 1896 and 1912 he was the Landesdirektor of Brandenburg province. In 1904 he was appointed as a Geheimrat. From 1908 to 1911 Manteuffel was president of the Prussian House of Lords. He was also chairman of the Conservative Association of Tax and Economic Reformers.
