= Heinrich Friedrich von Arnim-Heinrichsdorff-Werbelow =

German general and politician (1792–1850)

Foreign minister of Prussia
- In office 24 February – 30 April 1849
- Monarch: Frederick William IV
- Preceded by: Hans von Bülow
- Succeeded by: Friedrich Wilhelm von Brandenburg

Personal details
- Born: 23 September 1791 Werbelow/Uckermark, Kingdom of Prussia
- Died: 18 April 1859 (aged 67) Berlin, Kingdom of Prussia

Heinrich Friedrich Graf von Arnim-Heinrichsdorff-Werbelow (23 September 1791 – 18 April 1859) was a Prussian statesman.

== Early life ==
Arnim was born on 23 September 1791 in Werbelow in the Kingdom of Prussia. He was the son of the Privy Councilor Heinrich August von Arnim (1760–1834) and Christine Ulrike Bernhardine von Borcke-Stargordt (1773–1818), and a was grandson of Werner Friedrich Abraham von Arnim.

== Career ==
Arnim participated in the War of the Sixth Coalition and then embarked on a diplomatic career. After working as legation secretary in Stockholm and in Paris, he was the Prussian envoy in Brussels from 1831, from 1841 in Paris and in Vienna from 1845 to 1848, where he acted entirely in accordance with Metternich's politics. He became an important advisor to king Frederick William IV of Prussia during the revolution of 1848. He encouraged the King to grant concessions to liberals and support German unification under Prussian leadership.

On 24 February 1849 he was appointed Foreign Minister of Prussia, And pursued a revolutionary foreign policy, reversing ties with the reactionary states of Russia and Austria. He sought with little success to gain French and British support for the creation of the German national state, and for the restoration of Polish independence. He resigned on 3 May 1849, as he did not agree with the German policy of the foreign ministry. From 1851 to 1857 he was once again Prussian ambassador to Vienna, he cultivated good relations with Austria as much as possible, which he saw as an indispensable ally of Prussia. He was a member of the Prussian House of Lords from 1857 until his death.

== Personal life ==
Arnim-Heinrichsdorff-Werbelow died in Berlin, unmarried, on 18 April 1859.
