= Marie von Schleinitz =

German salonnière (1842–1912)

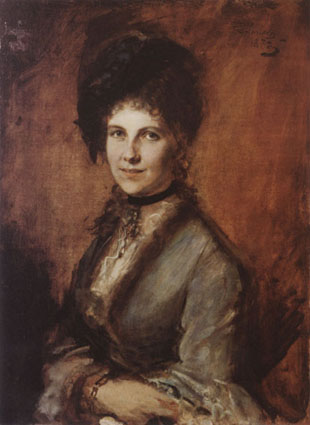
- Marie von Schleinitz; painting by Franz von Lenbach, 1873
- Born: 22 January 1842; Rome, Papal State
- Died: 18 May 1912 (aged 70); Berlin, Kingdom of Prussia, German Empire
- Occupation: Salonnière
- Known for: Supporter of Richard Wagner

Marie ("Mimi") Baroness (from 1879: Countess) von Schleinitz (from 1886: Schleinitz-Wolkenstein) (22 January 1842, Rome – 18 May 1912, Berlin) was an influential salonnière of the early German Reich in Berlin and one of the most important supporters of Richard Wagner.

== Life ==
=== Youth ===
Marie – nicknamed "Mimi" – was born in Rome as daughter of Ludwig August von Buch, Prussian ambassador to the Holy See. Her father died in 1845, and her mother, Marie von Nimptsch (1820–1897), married Prince Hermann Anton von Hatzfeldt zu Trachenberg (1808–1874) in 1847. By this marriage, the economic situation of mother and daughter, which until then had not been comfortable, improved due to the wealth of the Hatzfeldt family. Marie was trained as a pianist from her early youth; taught by such virtuosos as Carl Tausig, she developed a remarkable musical talent. Her acquaintance with Franz Liszt, who also showed interest in the advancement of her musical abilities, dates from this period.

=== Marriages ===
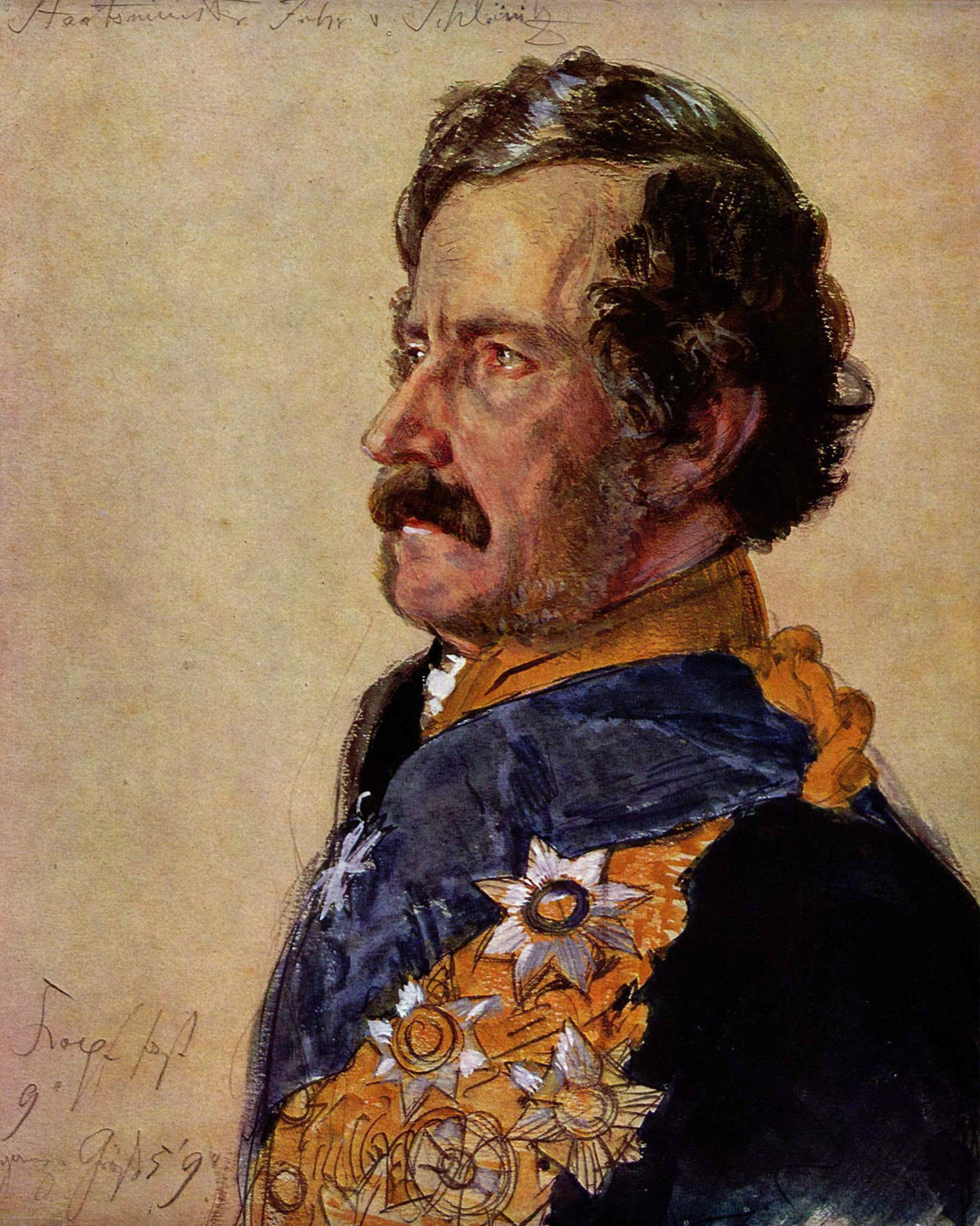
Count Alexander von Schleinitz, von Schleinitz's first husband; portrait by Adolph Menzel, 1865

In 1865 von Schleinitz married Baron Alexander von Schleinitz (1807–1885), then Prussian minister of the royal household. Her husband was thirty-five years older than her. In 1879 they were made Count and Countess by emperor William I, German Emperor. They had no children.

Her first husband died in 1885. In 1886 von Schleinitz married Count Anton von Wolkenstein-Trostburg (1832–1913), Austrian ambassador first in Berlin, then in Saint Petersburg, and finally (from 1894) in Paris. Henceforth, she called herself "Countess Schleinitz-Wolkenstein". In summertime, they retired to the country estate of the Wolkenstein family, the castle Ivano in the south of the County of Tyrol. After her second husband's retirement in 1904, they resettled in Berlin, where both died shortly before the breakout of World War I.

=== Richard Wagner ===
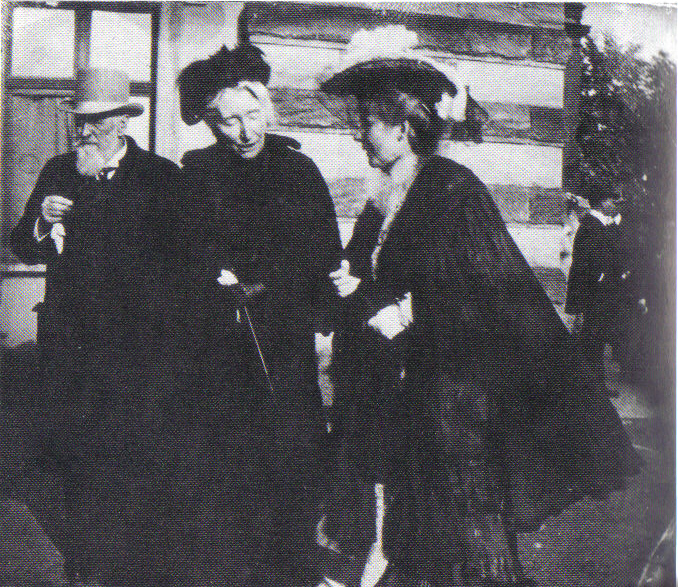
Cosima Wagner with Count and Countess Wolkenstein at the Bayreuth Festival, 1880s

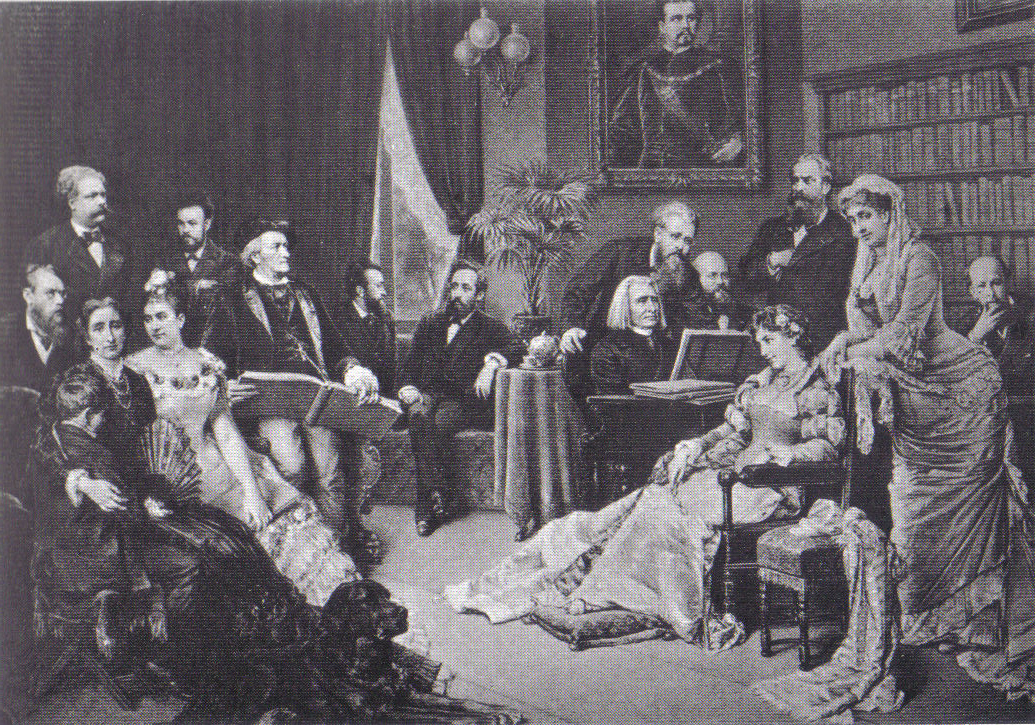
Richard Wagner at Villa Wahnfried with his closest friends, about 1880; painting by Georg Papperitz. On the right, sitting, is von Schleinitz.

Marie von Schleinitz became a passionate fan of Richard Wagner (1813–1883) beginning from the early 1860s, when she made his acquaintance of at a concert in Breslau. As the wife of the Prussian minister of the royal household, von Schleinitz used her social influence that was connected with her new rank to support and publicise Wagner's career among the leading circles of Prussian society. She supported him at the Prussian court; Emperor William I, granted him the opening of the Bayreuth Festival in 1876. von Schleinitz helped found the "Bayreuther Patronatsverein" (Bayreuth Patronage Club) in 1870, whose purpose was financing the diverse projects of Wagner, among them the building of the Bayreuth Festspielhaus, which was completed in 1876.

Marie von Schleinitz and Wagner were close personal friends from their first meeting, and exchanged many letters. After Wagner's remarriage in 1870, von Schleinitz became an intimate friend of Wagner's second wife, Cosima Wagner, whose daughter Daniela, later Mrs. Henry Thode, she introduced into Berlin society in the 1880s. Wagner died in 1883.

=== Literary salon ===
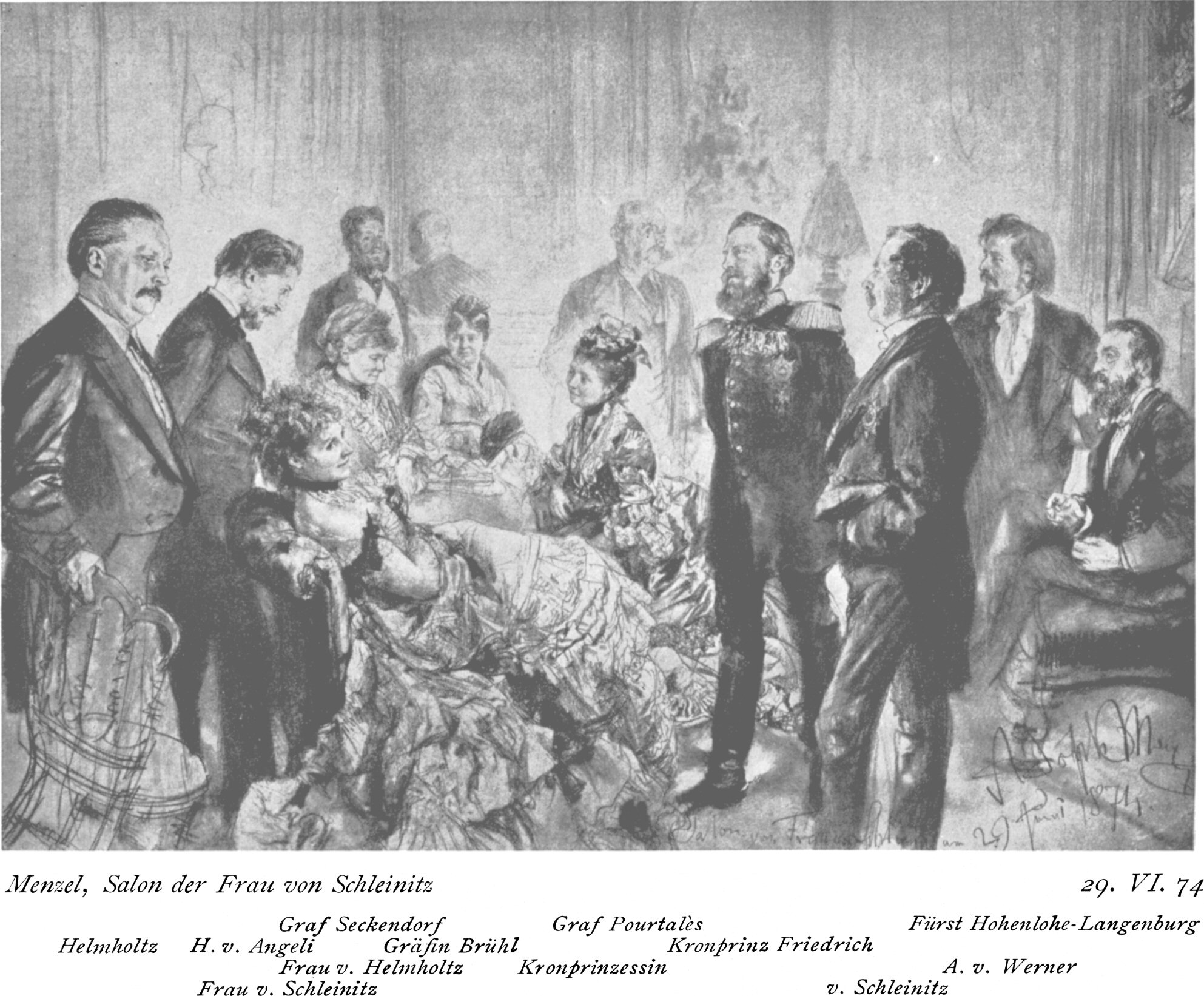
Soirée at the Schleinitz salon; drawing by Menzel, 1875. From left to right: Hermann von Helmholtz, Heinrich von Angeli, von Schleinitz, Anna von Helmholtz, count Götz von Seckendorff, countess Hedwig von Brühl, crown princess Victoria, count Wilhelm Pourtalès, crown prince Friedrich, Alexander von Schleinitz, Anton von Werner, prince Hermann of Hohenlohe-Langenburg.

From the beginning of her marriage, von Schleinitz hosted a literary salon at the ministerial residence of her husband at No. 77 Wilhelmstrasse in Berlin. She placed particular emphasis on the cultural and intellectual orientation of her salon, which contributed to her later fame as the only aristocratic woman in Berlin involved in modeling the cultural shape of the capital of the recently created German Empire. She mixed aristocratic and bourgeois elements in her salon, which was a novelty in the then still quite feudal society of Prussia. Until then, nobles, officers, and civil officials had scarcely come into contact with intellectuals, scholars, and businessmen.

In consequence of her second marriage to Wolkenstein, von Schleinitz gave up her salon in Berlin and accompanied her new husband on his several diplomatic missions. After his retirement from service in 1904, she reopened her house in Berlin, where she received personal friends and members of the political and cultural life of the Reich until her death in 1912.

=== Bismarck ===
Besides her friendship to Wagner, von Schleinitz was known for her rivalry with Otto von Bismarck (1815–1898). The Prussian prime minister and later Chancellor of Germany, who maintained a conservative, authoritarian rule over Prussia and Germany, was unsympathetic to von Schleinitz due to her liberal mentality. Bismarck was an enemy of her husband, who had been one of the protagonists of the so-called "new era" from 1858 to 1862, when William I and his wife Augusta followed a moderate strategy of modernization and liberalization of the Prussian state. Alexander von Schleinitz was a favorite of the liberal-minded queen Augusta. Nevertheless, von Schleinitz made several unsuccessful attempts to reconcile Bismarck with her husband and herself.

== Historical role ==
Marie von Schleinitz stands as a symbolic figure of the liberal-aristocratic opposition against Bismarck's conservative politics during the foundation of the German Reich, as well as for a short, intense blossoming of culture and intellectuality in Germany historically located between the downfall of romanticism and the beginning of modernity. Schleinitz's and her friend Anna von Helmholtz's salons (Helmholtz's salon mainly hosted scientists) were the two most influential Berlin salons in the Empire. Although Schleinitz herself was interested in music and literature much more than in politics, the alliance between the two salons, according to Petra Wilhelmy, almost amounted to an attempt of building an inner empire, binding the cultivated birth-aristocracy and the intellectual elite under liberal auspices. According to historian Michael Freund, "The greats of the country, emperors and kings, crown princes, generals, diplomats and statesmen met at Frau von Schleinitz's; But respect was also shown to leading representatives of intellectual life. Anyone who was admitted to Frau von Schleinitz's exclusive salon had passed the admission exam for Prussia's higher society".

== Sources ==
=== Schleinitz family ===
- Otto Freiherr von Schleinitz (ed.): Aus den Papieren der Familie v. Schleinitz. Mit einer Vorbemerkung von Fedor von Zobeltitz. Berlin 1904.

=== Wagner family ===
- Cosima Wagner: Die Tagebücher. 2 vols., München 1976 f.
- Richard Wagner: Schriften und Dichtungen. 16 vols., Fritzsch, Leipzig 1911.
- Richard-Wagner-Stiftung Bayreuth (ed.): Richard Wagner: Sämtliche Briefe. 13 vols., Leipzig 2000–2003.

=== Other primary sources ===
- Otto von Bismarck: Gedanken und Erinnerungen, ed. Ernst Friedlaender, Stuttgart 1959.
- Bernhard von Bülow: Denkwürdigkeiten. 4 vols., Berlin 1930 f.
- Hans von Bülow: Briefe und Schriften. 8 vols., ed. Marie von Bülow, Leipzig 1895–1911.
- Marie von Bunsen: Zeitgenossen, die ich erlebte. Leipzig 1932.
- Philipp zu Eulenburg: Aus fünfzig Jahren. Paetel, Berlin 1923, p. 58 f.
- Anna von Helmholtz: Anna von Helmholtz. Ein Lebensbild in Briefen, ed. Ellen von Helmholtz-Siemens, 2 vols., Berlin 1929.
- Harry Graf Kessler: Gesichter und Zeiten (= Gesammelte Schriften, vol. 1). Frankfurt/Main 1988.
- Lilli Lehmann: Mein Weg. vol. 1, Leipzig 1913.
- Maximiliane von Oriola: Maxe von Arnim, Tochter Bettinas, Gräfin Oriola, 1818–1894. Ein Lebens- und Zeitbild aus alten Quellen geschöpft, ed. Johannes Werner, Leipzig 1937.
- Hildegard von Spitzemberg: Tagebuch, ed. Rudolf Vierhaus, Göttingen 1960.
- Fedor von Zobeltitz: Chronik der Gesellschaft unter dem letzten Kaiserreich. 2 vols., Hamburg 1922.
