= Alexander von Schleinitz =

Alexander Gustav Adolf von Schleinitz
- Alexander von Schleinitz (portrait study by Adolph Menzel, 1865)

Prussian Minister of the Royal Household
- In office 12 October 1861 – 19 February 1885
- Monarch: William I
- Preceded by: Ludwig von Massow
- Succeeded by: Otto Graf zu Stolberg-Wernigerode

Foreign Minister of Prussia
- In office 19 June – 25 June 1848
- Monarch: Frederick William IV
- Preceded by: Heinrich Alexander von Arnim
- Succeeded by: Rudolf von Auerswald
- In office 21 July 1849 – 26 September 1850
- Monarch: Frederick William IV
- Preceded by: Friedrich Wilhelm von Brandenburg
- Succeeded by: Joseph von Radowitz
- In office 6 November 1858 – 12 October 1861
- Monarchs: Frederick William IV; William I
- Preceded by: Otto Theodor von Manteuffel
- Succeeded by: Albrecht von Bernstorff

Personal details
- Born: 29 December 1807 Blankenburg am Harz, Kingdom of Westphalia
- Died: 19 February 1885 (aged 77) Berlin, German Empire
- Spouse: Marie von Buch (after 1865)

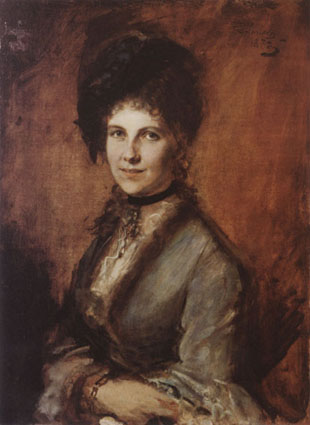
Countess Marie von Schleinitz, Alexander's wife. Painting by Franz von Lenbach, 1873

Alexander Gustav Adolf Graf von Schleinitz (29 December 1807 in Blankenburg am Harz – 19 February 1885 in Berlin) was the Foreign Minister of Prussia from 1858 to 1861 and minister for the royal household from late 1861 to his death.

== Life ==
=== Early years ===
He came from an old aristocratic family from the Margraviate of Meissen that was elevated to the rank of Reichsfreiherr already in the 16th century; his father was the Regierungspräsident of Blankenburg, and later minister of state in the Duchy of Brunswick, Karl Ferdinand Freiherr von Schleinitz (1756–1837); his mother was Barbara von Hochstetter (1768–1819). He was the brother of the minister of state of Brunswick, Wilhelm von Schleinitz (1794–1856), and of the Prussian Regierungspräsident Julius von Schleinitz (1806–1865).

Schleinitz studied in Göttingen and Berlin, and joined the Prussian civil service in 1828. In 1835 he became an embassy attaché, in 1841 he was made an Expert Councillor (Vortragender Rat) in the foreign ministry. In July 1848 he replaced Heinrich Alexander von Arnim as Foreign Minister, thus joining the government of Gottfried Ludolf Camphausen. However, after a few days he resigned from his post, and subsequently represented Prussia at the court of Hannover.

=== Political career ===
In May 1849 he negotiated the peace treaty with Denmark, and in July 1849 once again took up the position of Foreign Minister in the government of Friedrich Wilhelm, Count Brandenburg. However, since his German patriotic views were not compatible with the way Prussian politics was developing, he retired from public service on 26 September 1850 as a Wirklicher Geheimer Rat, and from then lived near Koblenz in close contact with the court of the Prince of Prussia, and at Schloss Gebesee in Thuringia.

After the Prince-Regent, the later King and Emperor Wilhelm I, assumed control of the government, Schleinitz, who was one of the King's closest confidants, once again took over the Foreign Ministry, in the Prince-Regent's government of the "New Era" that was called together in November 1858. The main tenets of his foreign policy were the attempt to form an alliance with Britain and Austria, the maintenance of the balance of power in Europe and a strengthening of Prussia's role in Germany. The domestic problems of the liberal government moved him to leave the government in October 1861 and take over the Ministry of the Royal Household, where he remained to his death in 1885. From then onwards he was the arch-enemy of Otto von Bismarck, who became Prime Minister of Prussia in 1862. Prussian Liberals, as well as Bismarck himself at times saw the Household Ministry as a "Counter-Government" of Queen Augusta, to the King's conservative government.

On the occasion of the Emperor's and Empress' golden wedding anniversary, Schleinitz and his wife were elevated to the rank of Graf (Count) on 11 June 1879.

== Marriage ==
From 1865, Alexander von Schleinitz was married to Marie von Buch (1842–1912), who was 35 years younger than he was. As Gräfin Schleinitz she became the most important salonière of the time in Berlin. Along with "Mimi", as she was known, he championed Richard Wagner and the Bayreuth Festival.

They had no children. Their joint grave, which has not been preserved, is in the Trinity Church Cemetery No. 1 in Berlin.

== Honours and awards ==
- Kingdom of Prussia:
  - Knight of Honour of the Johanniter Order, 11 August 1841
  - Knight of the Royal Crown Order, 1st Class, 18 October 1861; with Enamel Band of the Red Eagle Order and Oak Leaves, 1865
  - Grand Cross of the Red Eagle, with Oak Leaves, 30 December 1864
  - Grand Commander's Cross of the Royal House Order of Hohenzollern, 5 October 1867
  - Iron Cross (1870), 2nd Class
  - Knight of the Black Eagle, 3 April 1872; with Collar, 1873
- Hohenzollern: Cross of Honour of the Princely House Order of Hohenzollern, 1st Class
- Anhalt: Grand Cross of the Order of Albert the Bear, 18 December 1865
- Baden: Grand Cross of the Zähringer Lion, 1850
- Kingdom of Bavaria: Knight of St. Hubert, 1860
- Brunswick: Grand Cross of the Order of Henry the Lion
- (Saxe-Coburg and Gotha) (Duchy of Saxe-Altenburg) (Saxe-Meiningen) Ernestine duchies: Grand Cross of the Saxe-Ernestine House Order, in Diamonds, March 1850
- Kingdom of Hanover: Grand Cross of the Royal Guelphic Order, 1861
- Mecklenburg: Grand Cross of the Wendish Crown, with Golden Crown
- (Duchy of Nassau) Nassau Ducal Family: Knight of the Gold Lion of Nassau
- Oldenburg: Grand Cross of the Order of Duke Peter Friedrich Ludwig, with Golden Crown and Collar, 18 February 1878
- Saxe-Weimar-Eisenach: Grand Cross of the White Falcon, 20 May 1850
- Austrian Empire: Grand Cross of the Royal Hungarian Order of St. Stephen, 1860
- Belgium: Grand Cordon of the Order of Leopold
- French Empire: Grand Cross of the Legion of Honour, November 1861
- Kingdom of Italy: Grand Cross of Saints Maurice and Lazarus
- Netherlands: Grand Cross of the Netherlands Lion
- Ottoman Empire:
  - Order of Distinction
  - Order of the Medjidie, 1st Class
  - Order of Osmanieh, 1st Class
- Kingdom of Portugal: Grand Cross of the Tower and Sword, in Diamonds
- Russian Empire:
  - Knight of St. Andrew
  - Knight of St. Alexander Nevsky, in Diamonds
- Two Sicilies: Knight of St. Januarius
