= List of ambassadors of Germany to Belgium =

List of German ambassadors to Belgium.

== Heads of Mission ==
=== Ambassadors of the German Empire ===
Name	Image	Term Start	Term End	Notes
North German Confederation
Hermann Ludwig von Balan	Hermann Ludwig von Balan	1868	1871	
/ / German Empire
Hermann Ludwig von Balan	Hermann Ludwig von Balan	1871	1874	
Wilhelm von Perponcher-Sedlnitzky		1874	1875	
Gustav von Brandenburg		1876	1886	
Friedrich Johann von Alvensleben		1886	1901	Envoy
Nikolaus von Wallwitz		1901	1909	Envoy
Hans von Flotow		1910	1912	Envoy
Claus von Below-Saleske		1912	1914	Envoy
Otto Landsberg		1920	1923	
Friedrich von Keller		1924	1928	
Alfred Horstmann		1928	1931	
Hugo Graf von Lerchenfeld		1931	1933	
Raban Adelmann von Adelmannsfelden		1934	1936	
Herbert von Richthofen		1936	1938	
Vicco von Bülow-Schwante		1938	1940	
Werner von Bargen		1940	1943	

=== Ambassadors of the Federal Republic of Germany ===
Name	Image	Term Start	Term End	Notes
Federal Republic of Germany
Anton Pfeiffer		1950	1954	
Carl Friedrich Ophüls		1955	1958	
Kurt Oppler		1959	1963	
Herbert Siegfried		1963	1966	
Georg Federer		1966	1968	
Reinhold Renauld von Ungern-Sternberg		1968	1973	
Peter Limbourg		1973	1980	
Horst Blomeyer-Bartenstein		1980	1983	
Christian Feit		1983	1986	
Renate Finke-Osiander		1987	1991	
Hans von Stein		1991	1993	
Rolf Hofstetter		1996	2000	
Peter von Butler		2000	2004	
Johann Christoph Jessen		2004	2007	
Reinhard Bettzuege		2007	2011	
Eckart Cuntz	Eckart Cuntz	2011	2015	
Rüdiger Lüdeking		2015	2018	
Martin Kotthaus		2018	Present	

== Ambassador of German states (before 1871) ==
=== Bavarian envoys ===
1824: Establishment of diplomatic relations

Name	Image	Term Start	Term End	Notes
Kingdom of Bavaria
Franz Oliver von Jenison-Walworth	Franz Oliver von Jenison-Walworth	1824	1826	
Vacant		1826	1847	
Maximilian von Marogna		1847	1867	
Friedrich von Quadt-Wykradt-Isny		1867	1868	
Maximilian von Gise		1868	1869	
Carl Johann Friedrich von Niethammer		1869	1871	
1872-1914: Represented by the Bavarian ambassador in Paris

1914: Dissolution of the embassy

=== Prussian envoys ===
1831: Establishment of diplomatic relations

Name	Image	Term Start	Term End	Notes
Kingdom of Prussia
Heinrich Friedrich von Arnim-Heinrichsdorff-Werbelow		1831	1841	
Alexander von Arnim-Suckow	Alexander von Arnim-Suckow	1841	1845	
Rudolf von Sydow		1845	1847	
Theodor Franz Christian von Seckendorff		1847	1852	
Adolf von Brockhausen		1852	1858	
Heinrich Alexander von Redern		1859	1863	
Hermann Ludwig von Balan	Hermann Ludwig von Balan	1864	1868	

From 1867: Ambassador of the North German Confederation

=== Saxon envoys ===
Name	Image	Term Start	Term End	Notes
Kingdom of Saxony
Albin Leo von Seebach		1852	1862	
Richard von Könneritz	Richard von Könneritz	1862	1863	
Oswald von Fabrice	Oswald von Fabrice	1864	1874	

== See also ==
- Belgium–Germany relations
