= Ernst von Pfuel =

Prussian general (1779–1866)

Ernst Heinrich Adolf von Pfuel
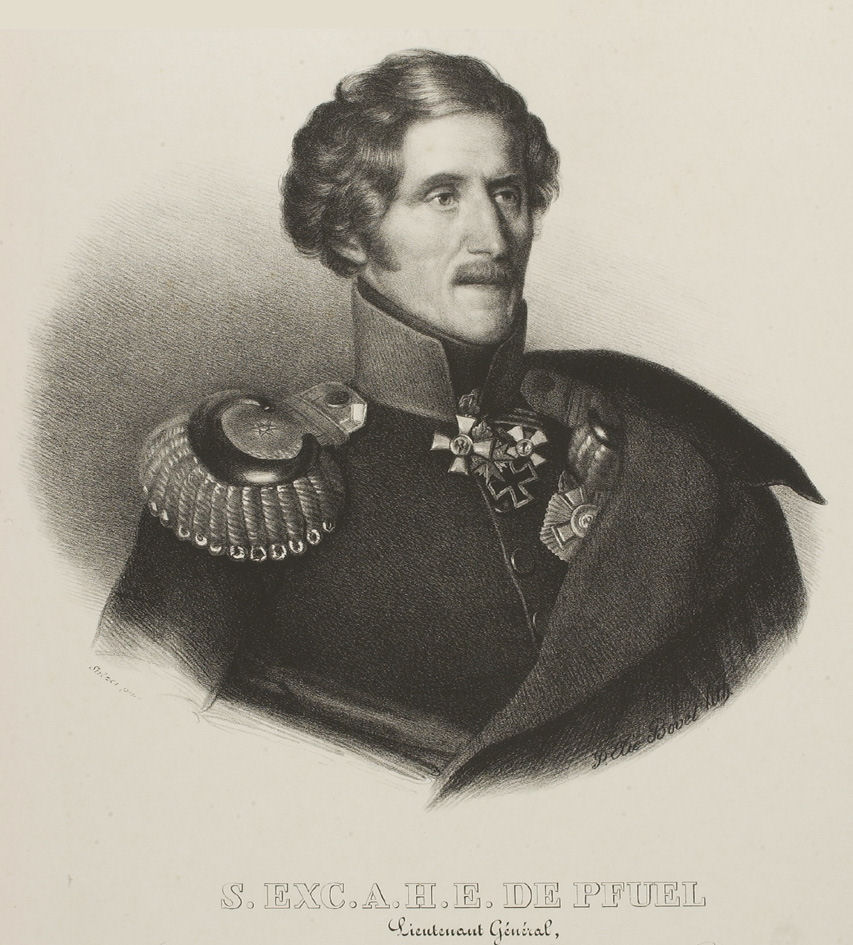

4th Minister President of Prussia
- In office 21 September 1848 – 1 November 1848
- Monarch: Frederick William IV
- Preceded by: Rudolf von Auerswald
- Succeeded by: Friedrich Wilhelm, Count Brandenburg

Personal details
- Born: 3 November 1779 Jahnsfelde, Prussia
- Died: 3 December 1866 (aged 87) Berlin, Prussia

Military service
- Allegiance: (Kingdom of Prussia) Prussia
- Branch/service: Prussian Army
- Battles/wars: Napoleonic Wars

Ernst Heinrich Adolf von Pfuel (3 November 1779 – 3 December 1866) was a Prussian general who served as Minister of War and later Minister President of Prussia.

== Biography ==
A member of the noble Pfuel family, Ernest Pfuel was born in Jahnsfelde, Prussia (present-day Müncheberg, Germany), the son of General Ludwig von Pfuel and Johanna Christiane Sophie Krantz. He studied at the Prussian War College. Pfuel served as commander of Cologne and the Prussian sector of Allied-occupied Paris in 1814-1815, during the Napoleonic Wars, and was promoted to general major in 1825. In 1831, he was appointed Frederick William III's commissioner to Neuchâtel, a Swiss canton and a principality of the King of Prussia, where he suppressed revolutionary activities. Pfuel served as governor of Neuchâtel from 1832 until 1848, when a republican revolution ended Prussian rule.

After a brief period as governor of Berlin, Pfuel replaced Karl Wilhelm von Willisen as the Royal Special Commissioner of King Frederick William IV during the German Revolution of 1848. He was a member of the Prussian National Assembly of 1848 and later that year served as Prussian Minister of War from 7 September to 2 November, as well as Minister President of Prussia.

Pfuel was a close friend of Heinrich von Kleist. He was also an innovator of the breaststroke swimming technique, and the founder of the world's first military swimming-school, in 1810 in Prague. From 1816 he was a member of the Gesetzlose Gesellschaft zu Berlin. He died in Berlin on 3 December 1866, aged 87.

== See also ==
- Pfuel cabinet
