= Joseph von Radowitz =

Prussian general and statesman (1797–1853)

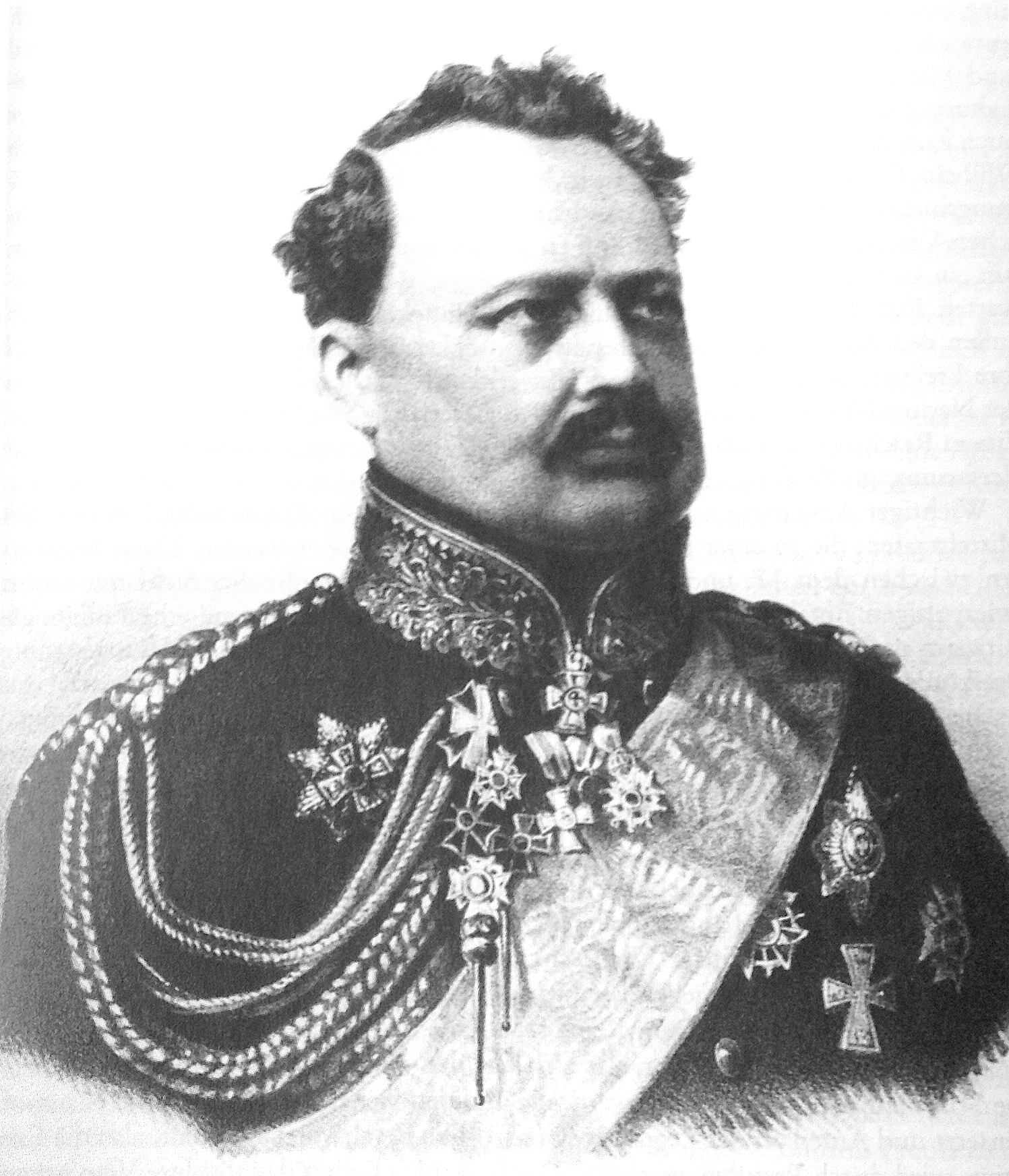

Foreign minister of Prussia
- In office 26 September – 2 November 1850
- Monarch: Frederick William IV
- Preceded by: Alexander von Schleinitz
- Succeeded by: Otto Theodor von Manteuffel

Personal details
- Born: 6 February 1797 Blankenburg am Harz, Principality of Brunswick-Wolfenbüttel
- Died: 25 December 1853 (aged 56) Berlin, Kingdom of Prussia
- Spouse: Countess Maria Auguste Karoline Luise von Voß
- Children: 5

Joseph Maria Ernst Christian Wilhelm von Radowitz (6 February 1797 – 25 December 1853) was a conservative Prussian statesman and general famous for his proposal to unify Germany under Prussian leadership by means of a negotiated agreement among the reigning German princes.

== Early years ==
Radowitz was born to Roman Catholic nobility in Blankenburg am Harz, in Brunswick-Wolfenbüttel. His family being of Serb-Hungarian origin. He received a military education in France and fought in Napoleon's army. As a young lieutenant in the Westphalian artillery, Radowitz was wounded and taken prisoner at the battle of Leipzig (1813), subsequently entered the Hanoverian service, and in 1823 that of Prussia. His promotion was rapid, and in 1830 he became chief of the general staff of the artillery.

== Prussian envoy ==
In 1836, Radowitz went as Prussian military plenipotentiary to the federal diet at Frankfurt, and in 1842 was appointed envoy to the courts of Karlsruhe, Darmstadt and Nassau. He had early become an intimate friend of the crown prince (afterwards King Frederick William IV), and the Prussian constitution of February 1847 was an attempt to realize the ideas put forward by him in his Gespräche aus den Gegenwart der Staat und Kirche, published under the pseudonym "Waldheim" in 1846.

== Promoting Prussian unionist policy ==
In November 1847 and March 1848 Radowitz was sent by Frederick William to Vienna to attempt to arrange common action for the reconstruction of the German Confederation. In the Frankfurt Parliament he was leader of the conservative Right; and, after its break-up, he was zealous in promoting the Unionist policy of Prussia, which he defended both in the Prussian diet and in the Erfurt parliament.

== Prussian foreign minister ==
He was practically responsible for the foreign policy of Prussia from May 1848 onwards, and on 27 September 1850 he was appointed minister of foreign affairs. He resigned, however, on 2 November, owing to the king's refusal to settle the difficulties with the Austrian Empire by an appeal to arms.

== Literary pursuits ==
In August 1852, he was appointed director of military education, but the rest of his life was devoted mainly to literary pursuits. Radowitz published, in addition to several political treatises, Ikonographie der Heiligen, im Beitrag zur Kunstgeschichte (Berlin, 1834) and Devisen und Mottos des spätern Mittelalters (ii., 1850). His Gesammelte Schriften were published in 5 vols. at Berlin, 1852–53.

== Death ==
Radowitz died on 25 December 1853 in Berlin.

== Family ==
Radowitz married Countess Maria Auguste Karoline Luise von Voß (27 April 1807 – 1 October 1889) on 23 May 1828 in Berlin. They had five children:

- Marie Luise Auguste Mathilde Christiane Gerhardine Albertine (1829–1834)
- Julius Felix Joseph Maria Friedrich August Karl Wilhelm (born 1830)
- Clemens Maria Ludwig Georg Hermann Leopold Alexis (1832–1890), Prussian general
- Paul Maria Ludwig Eugen (born 1835)
- Joseph Maria Friedrich (1839–1912), Prussian diplomat

== Orders and decorations ==
- Kingdom of Prussia:
  - Knight of the Red Eagle, 1st Class with Oak Leaves
  - Grand Commander's Cross of the Royal House Order of Hohenzollern
  - Service Award Cross
- Austrian Empire: Commander of the Imperial Order of Leopold
- Baden: Grand Cross of the Zähringer Lion, 1842
- Kingdom of Bavaria:
  - Grand Cross of the Merit Order of St. Michael
  - Commander of Merit of the Bavarian Crown
- Denmark: Commander of the Dannebrog
- Kingdom of France: Knight of the Legion of Honour
- Kingdom of Hanover: Commander of the Royal Guelphic Order
- Grand Duchy of Hesse: Commander of the Ludwig Order, 1st Class
- Russian Empire: Knight of St. Anna, 2nd Class in Diamonds
- Kingdom of Saxony: Commander of the Civil Merit Order, 2nd Class
- Württemberg: Commander of the Württemberg Crown

== Sources ==
- Josef von Radowitz. Nachgelassene Briefe und Aufzeichnungen zur Geschichte der Jahre 1848–1853. W. Moring (ed.) (1922).
