= Otto Theodor von Manteuffel =

Prussian politician (1805–1882)

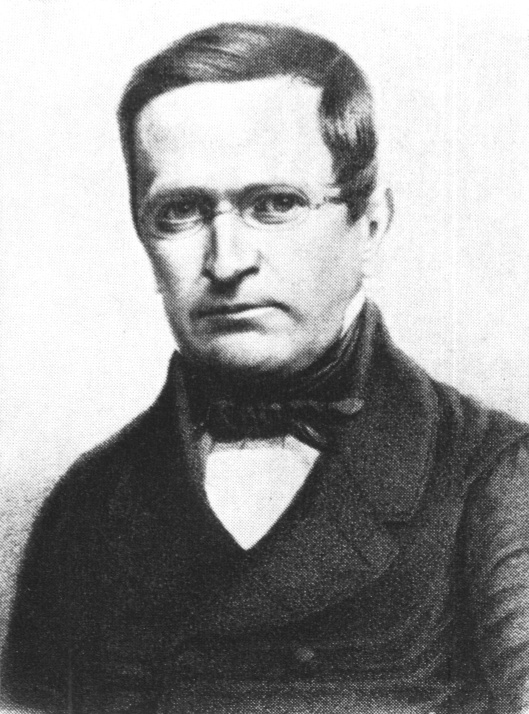

6th Minister President of Prussia
- In office 9 December 1850 – 6 November 1858
- Monarch: Frederick William IV
- Preceded by: Friedrich Wilhelm, Count Brandenburg
- Succeeded by: Karl Anton, Prince of Hohenzollern

Foreign Minister of Prussia
- In office 2 November 1850 – 6 November 1858
- Monarch: Frederick William IV
- Preceded by: Joseph von Radowitz
- Succeeded by: Alexander von Schleinitz

Personal details
- Born: 3 February 1805 Lübben (Spreewald), Brandenburg, kingdom of Prussia
- Died: 26 November 1882 (aged 77) Gut Krossen, German Empire

Otto Theodor Freiherr von Manteuffel (3 February 1805 – 26 November 1882) was a conservative Prussian statesman, serving nearly a decade as prime minister.

== Early life ==
Born into an aristocratic family in Lübben (Spreewald), Manteuffel attended the Landesschule Pforta from 1819. In 1824–1827, he studied jurisprudence and cameralism at the University of Halle, where he joined the Corps Saxonia Halle, a duelling Studentenverbindung in the Kösener Senioren-Convents-Verband ("KSCV").

== Career ==
In 1830, Manteuffel commenced his clerkship in law. He became a Landrat (local administrator) of the district of Luckau in 1833; in 1841, he was promoted to Oberregierungsrat (a senior administrative position) in Königsberg, and in 1843 he was made vice-president of the government in Stettin. In 1844, the Prince of Prussia, who was then the head of the Ministry of State, appointed him there as an expert councillor (vortragender Rat). Soon thereafter he was also made a member of the royal Council of State. He worked in the field of finance until in 1845 he was made Director at the Ministry of the Interior. The Vereinigte Landtag of 1847 (an assembly of the members of Prussia's provincial legislatures) gave him an opportunity to demonstrate his parliamentary skills, whereupon Manteuffel showed himself a champion of the bureaucratic political system and an opponent of constitutional liberalism.

On November 8, 1848, Manteuffel entered the cabinet of Friedrich Wilhelm, Count Brandenburg, receiving the portfolio of the Ministry of the Interior. For the next ten years, he held various positions in the government and was high in the favor of King Friedrich Wilhelm IV.

Manteuffel had a major part in drafting the Prussian constitution of 5 December 1848. But it was also he who contributed to the announcement of 7 January 1850, which repealed significant provisions of that constitution; he also defended it in Parliament. During his career in the post-revolution Prussian government, Manteuffel proved an important reformer whose changes were of crucial historical importance. He conceived of the purpose of government as being a mediating entity for the "conflicting interests" within Prussian civil society. In pursuing this mediation position, Manteuffel often came into conflict with the conservative and ultra-conservative members of the parliamentary government, whom he found unwilling to fully embrace the new constitutional order. He stressed that gone were the days in which the Prussian state should act, in his own words, 'like the landed estate of a nobleman.' He faced this opposition head on. However, Manteuffel's efforts to impose a more structured decision making apparatus within the royal palace was halted by the ultra-conservatives who, due to their high aristocratic status, traditionally had the most direct contact with the king.

There was a greater degree of success to be found in Manteuffel's other efforts, however. One of these was directed at creating a less regulated economy. In 1856, as Minister-President, he oversaw government policy removing state controls over the "flow of credit to financial institutions" and limiting supervisory powers within the iron and coal industries. Manteuffel also enjoyed success in his efforts to give the Prussian state a much more hands-off stance toward the press. This was a necessary step due to the increased antagonism between these two entities in recent years. Switching from a policy of outright censorship, after 1848 the Prussian state began imposing hefty penalties on publications which printed material damaging to state interests. Responding to increasing pressure to find a different press policy, Manteuffel decided to diminish the confrontational nature of the government stance. The government no longer directly censored or attacked the press but instead joined the printed debate through the placement of "government friendly-articles in key journals." This was a major shift in the relationship between press and state in Prussia. Instead of imposing regulations from above, the government operated in the arena of the press itself. Manteuffel was thus very much aware of the need to face rather than repress the power of the press which, in his words, '[had] grown with the expanded participation of the people in public affairs.'

When he was temporarily entrusted with managing foreign affairs after the Count of Brandenburg died, he took part in the negotiations for the Agreement of Olmütz in November 1850, and surrendered the constitutional rights of Kurhessen and Holstein to the Austrian restoration zeal. "The strong man takes a step back"; these were the words with which he sought to calm the members of the recently re-established Bundestag who were unhappy with these measures. On 19 December 1850 he was permanently appointed Prussian Prime Minister and Foreign Minister, in which function he took part in the negotiations for the Treaty of Paris of 1856. He remained in this post until October 1858, when the king gave up the throne, and the Prince of Prussia (afterwards Emperor William the Great) became regent.

On 6 November, he and the entire cabinet were dismissed. He thereupon withdrew to his estate in Lausitz, and after being elected by Görlitz entered the Prussian House of Representatives, but did not participate in the proceedings in any spectacular way. From 1864 he was a member of the Prussian House of Lords.

== Honors ==
On 6 February 1850, he was made an honorary citizen of Berlin, and the Manteuffelstraße in Kreuzberg was named after him. In the southern part of Wlhelmshaven, another Manteuffelstraße was opened on 17 June 1869 in the presence of King Wilhelm I. By the street lay the Manteuffelplatz (Exerzierplatz). He was also an honorary citizen of Danzig, Brandenburg an der Havel, Stettin and all the towns of the Niederlausitz.

He died at Gut Krossen in Luckau in Niederlausitz.

=== Orders and decorations ===
- Kingdom of Prussia:
  - Grand Cross of the Red Eagle, with Oak Leaves, Crown, and Scepter, 18 January 1851
  - Grand Commander's Cross of the Royal House Order of Hohenzollern, 23 August 1851
  - Knight of the Black Eagle, 29 March 1856; with Collar, 1857; in Diamonds, 1858
  - Commander of Honour of the Johanniter Order, 1856
- Kingdom of Saxony: Knight of the Rue Crown, 1851
- Grand Duchy of Hesse: Grand Cross of the Ludwig Order, 27 June 1851
- Electorate of Hesse: Knight of the Golden Lion, 12 August 1851
- Belgium: Grand Cordon of the Order of Leopold (civil), 14 April 1852
- Denmark: Knight of the Elephant, 11 June 1852
- Baden:
  - Grand Cross of the Zähringer Lion, 1852
  - Knight of the House Order of Fidelity, 1853
- Kingdom of Bavaria: Knight of St. Hubert, 1853
- Ascanian duchies: Grand Cross of the Order of Albert the Bear, 25 January 1854
- Oldenburg: Grand Cross of the Order of Duke Peter Friedrich Ludwig, with Golden Crown, 21 March 1854
- (Saxe-Coburg and Gotha) (Duchy of Saxe-Altenburg) (Saxe-Meiningen) Ernestine duchies: Grand Cross of the Saxe-Ernestine House Order, March 1854
- United Mexican States: Grand Cross of the National Order of Our Lady of Guadalupe, 1855
- Württemberg: Grand Cross of the Württemberg Crown, 1856

== See also ==
- Manteuffel cabinet

== Notes ==
=== References ===
- Clark, Christopher (2006). Iron Kingdom: The Rise and Downfall of Prussia, 1600–1947. Cambridge, MA: Harvard University Press. ISBN 9780674023857.
- Schurz, Carl, Lebenserinnerungen bis zum Jahre 1850: Selections, edited with notes and vocabulary by Edward Manley, Norwood, Massachusetts: Allyn and Bacon, 1913. This is a German reader. The text is in German and the notes are in English.
- Wippermann, Karl (1884). "Manteuffel, Otto Theodor von". Allgemeine Deutsche Biographie (in German). 20: 260–272.
