= Prussian House of Lords =

Upper house of the Kingdom of Prussia

Coordinates: 52°30′33″N 13°22′53″E

Prussian House of Lords Preußisches Herrenhaus
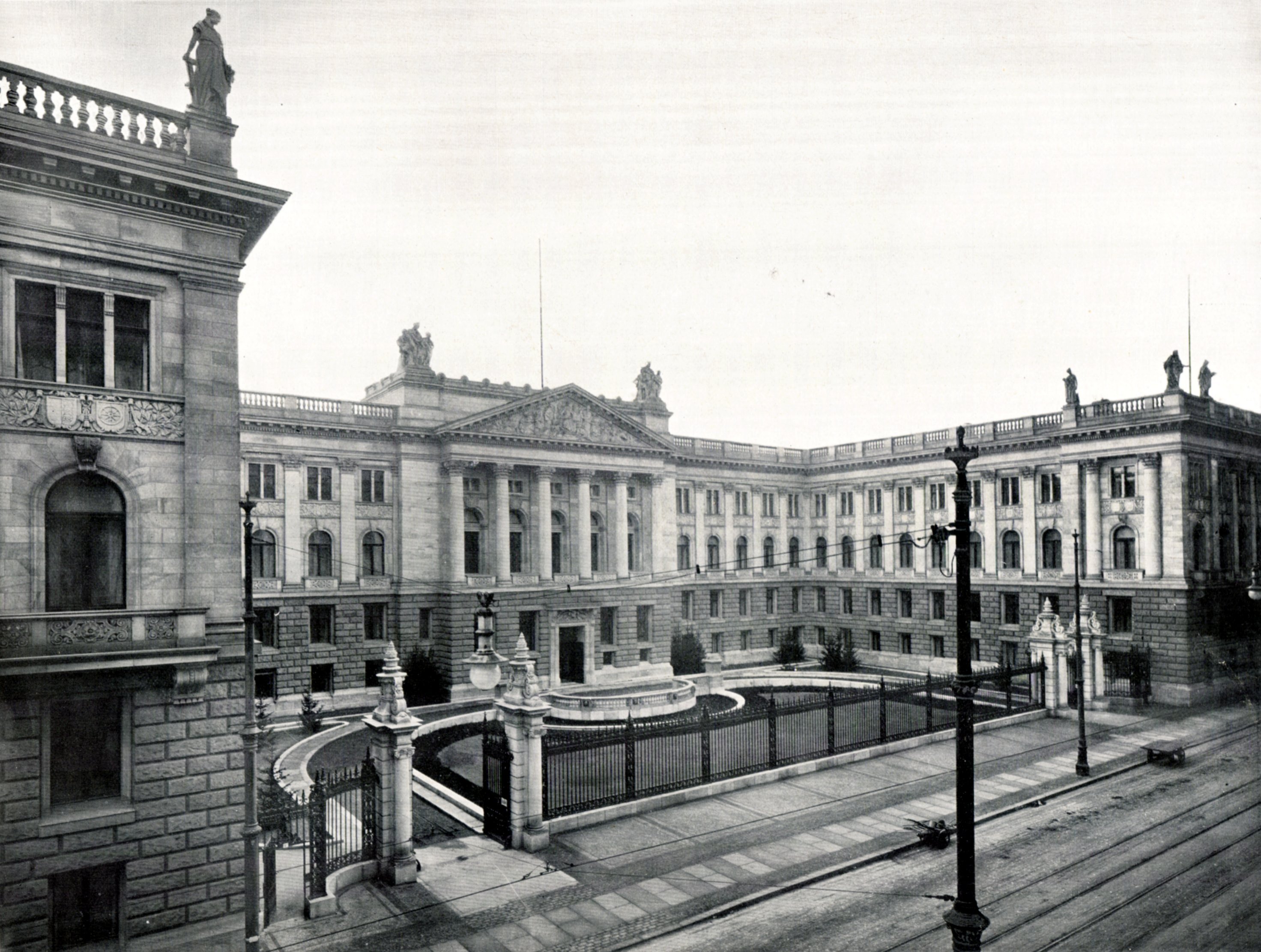
- Courtyard on Leipziger Straße, c. 1900

Type
- Type: Upper house

History
- Established: 31 January 1850
- Disbanded: 15 November 1918
- Preceded by: Prussian estates; Prussian National Assembly
- Succeeded by: Prussian State Council

Constitution
- Constitution of Prussia (1848); Constitution of Prussia (1850)

The Prussian House of Lords (German: Preußisches Herrenhaus) in Berlin was the upper house of the Landtag of Prussia (German: Preußischer Landtag), the parliament of Prussia from 1850 to 1918. Together with the lower house, the House of Representatives (German: Abgeordnetenhaus), it formed the Prussian bicameral legislature. The building is now used as the seat of the German Bundesrat at Leipziger Straße.

== Kingdom of Prussia ==
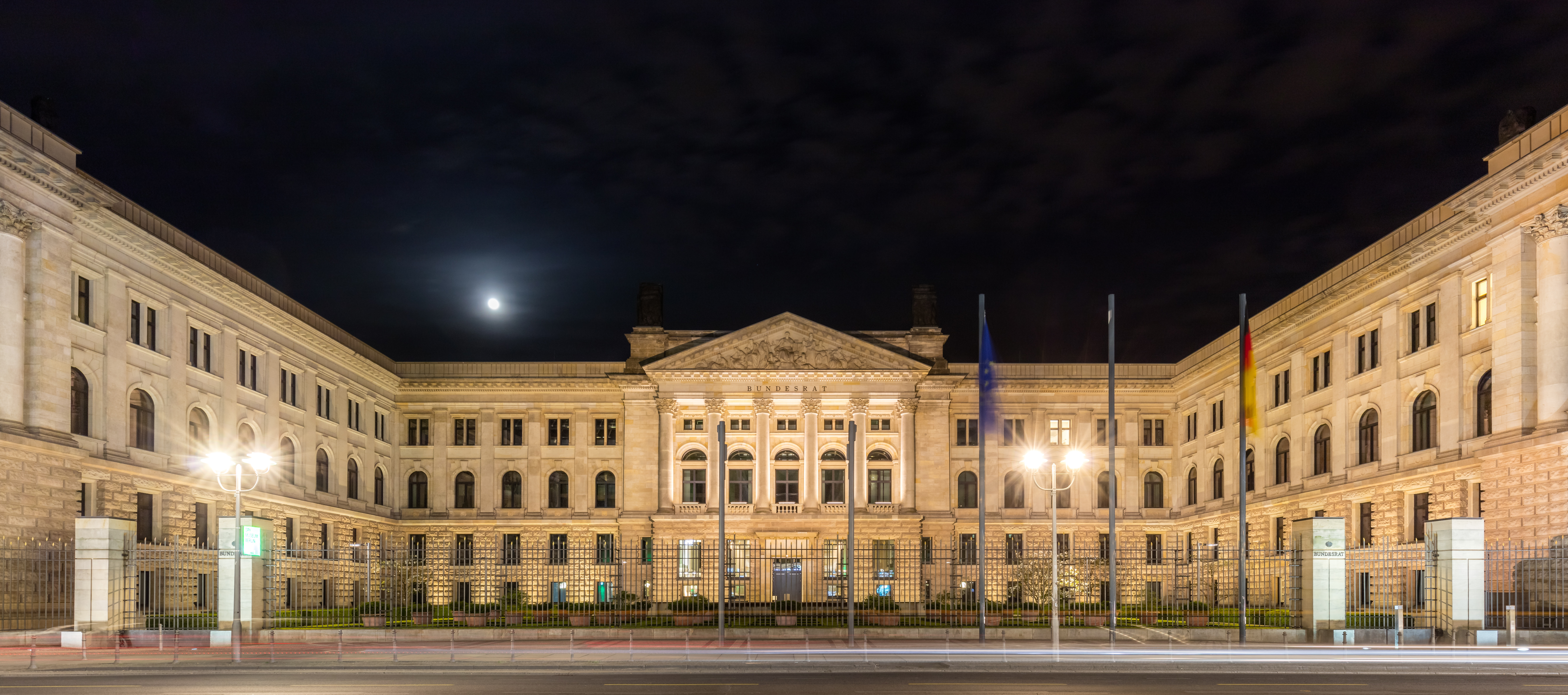
View by night

Modeled on the House of Lords of the United Kingdom, the Herrenhaus was created following the 1848 revolution with the adoption of the Constitution of the Kingdom of Prussia imposed by King Frederick William IV on 5 December 1848.

A member of the House of Lords was known as a pair (see also pairie), or officially as a member of the Prussian House of Lords (Mitglied des preußischen Herrenhauses, or MdH). The House consisted of hereditary peers, life peers appointed by the king of Prussia, peers by virtue of position, representatives of cities and universities, etc. The majority of members were nobles, although the House also had commoners as members, especially among the representatives of cities and universities. The breakdown was as follows:

- Princes of the royal house of Hohenzollern who had reached their majority
- Members with hereditary right:
  - The head of the princely house of Hohenzollern
  - The heads of the former German states of the Holy Roman Empire in royal Prussian lands—these were primarily mediatized princely houses (so-called Standesherren, incumbents of state countries), such as Arenberg, Bentheim-Steinfurt, Croÿ, Isenburg (also Ysenburg), Salm-Horstmar, Salm-Salm, Sayn-Wittgenstein-Berleburg, Sayn-Wittgenstein-Hohenstein, Solms-Hohensolms-Lich, Solms-Rödelheim-Assenheim, Stolberg-Wernigerode, and Wied.
  - Other members with hereditary right—these were primarily princes and counts from lands annexed by Prussia over the centuries, such as the duke of Schleswig-Holstein, Counts of Westphalen, and the landgrave of Hessen-Philippsthal.
- Life members:
  - Holders of the four great court appointments (große Hofämter) of the kingdom—these were the state steward (Landhofmeister), the chancellor (Kanzler), the lord marshal (Obermarschall), and the lord burgrave (Oberburggraf).
  - Members entrusted by the king—these were both nobles and commoners, and included select generals and admirals, senior government officials, business leaders, and philanthropists.
  - Members called by presentation—these were primarily holders of noble estates, the university representatives, and the lord mayors of cities given the right of presentation.

== Free State ==
With the German Revolution of 1918–1919 and the fall of the Hohenzollern monarchy resulting from World War I, the Prussian House of Lords was dissolved on 15 November 1918 by the revolutionary Executive Council of Workers' and Soldiers' Councils (Vollzugsrat des Arbeiter- und Soldatenrats). Under to the 1920 constitution of the Free State of Prussia it was replaced by the Staatsrat (state council) of representatives delegated by the Landtag assemblies of the Provinces. The Cologne mayor Konrad Adenauer served as president of the state council from 1921 until the Nazi Machtergreifung in 1933.

== Meeting place ==
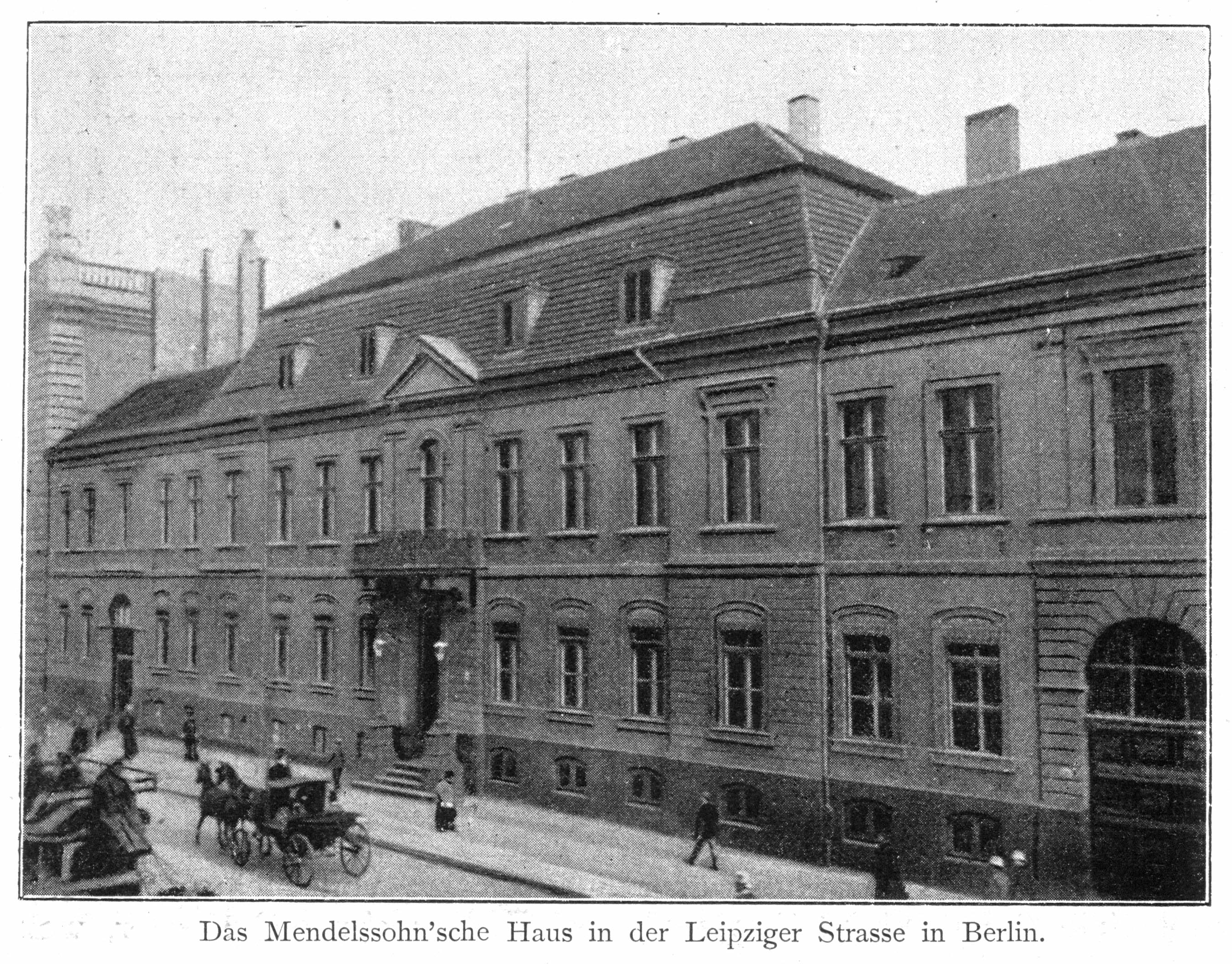
Former Mendelssohn residence, Leipziger Str. 3, before 1898

Starting in 1856, the House of Lords met at a Baroque city palace on Leipziger Straße No. 3, near Leipziger Platz, formerly owned by the merchant Johann Ernst Gotzkowsky (1710–1775) and seat of the Royal Porcelain Factory from 1763. It had been acquired by Abraham Mendelssohn Bartholdy (1776–1835), father of Felix and Fanny Mendelssohn, in 1825. In the summer of 1826, young Felix Mendelssohn wrote his A Midsummer Night's Dream overture, which premiered at his father's house.

After the Prussian state had purchased the building in 1856, it also served for the meetings of the Reichstag of the North German Federation from 1867 to 1870. Upon German unification in 1871, the neighbouring building on Leipziger Straße No. 4 was rebuilt as the seat of the Reichstag of the German Empire, before it moved into the new Reichstag building in 1894. Both the Leipziger Str. No. 3 and 4 buildings were demolished in 1898 to make space for a new building for the House of Lords.

The Neo-Renaissance Herrenhaus building, designed by the architect Friedrich Schulze, was completed in 1904. Schulze had had also built the adjacent Abgeordnetenhaus on Prinz-Albrecht-Straße from 1892 to 1898. Both structures were connected by a common functional wing in the rear, which allowed deputies to move freely between both chambers. Since 1993, the Abgeordnetenhaus building is the seat of the Berlin state parliament.

Seat of the Prussian state council from 1921 to 1933, the former Herrenhaus building from 1933 served for Hermann Göring's Preußenhaus foundation. The former debating chamber saw the inauguration of the People's Court (Volksgerichtshof) in 1934 and with the erection of neighbouring Ministry of Aviation the next year it was refurbished as the prestigious Haus der Flieger lobby of Göring's headquarters.

Heavily damaged by Allied bombing and the Battle of Berlin, the building was restored after the war and from 1946 served for the East German Academy of Sciences. Since 2000, it is the site of the parliamentary sessions of the Federal Council (Bundesrat) of Germany.

== See also ==
- List of presidents of the State Council of Prussia
- Members of the Prussian House of Lords
