= List of foreign ministers of Prussia =

This article lists foreign ministers of Prussia.

== History ==
After the creation of the German Empire in 1871, the imperial chancellor was normally also foreign minister of the Kingdom of Prussia. However, during the chancellorship of Prince Hohenlohe (1894–1900), the position was held by the state secretaries for foreign affairs. The main building of the office was at Wilhelmstrasse.

== Foreign ministers (1768–1918) ==
Name	Portrait	Took office	Left office	Notes
Ewald Friedrich von Hertzberg	Ewald Friedrich von Hertzberg	1768	1791	
August Friedrich Ferdinand von der Goltz		1808	1814	
Karl August von Hardenberg	Karl August von Hardenberg	1814	1818	
Christian Günther von Bernstorff	Christian Günther von Bernstorff	1818	1832	
Friedrich Ancillon	Jean Pierre Frédéric Ancillon	1832	1837	
Heinrich Wilhelm von Werther		1837	1841	
Mortimer von Maltzan		1841	1842	
Heinrich von Bülow	Heinrich von Bülow	1842	1845	
Karl Ernst Wilhelm von Canitz und Dallwitz	Karl von Canitz und Dallwitz	1845	March 1848	
Adolf Heinrich von Arnim-Boitzenburg	Adolf Heinrich von Arnim-Boitzenburg	19 March 1848	21 March 1848	Government instability brought on by German revolutions of 1848–1849
Heinrich Alexander von Arnim	Heinrich Alexander von Arnim	21 March 1848	19 June 1848	
Alexander von Schleinitz	Alexander von Schleinitz	19 June 1848	25 June 1848	First term
Rudolf von Auerswald	Rudolf von Auerswald	25 June 1848	21 September 1848	
August Heinrich Hermann von Dönhoff		21 September 1848	8 November 1848	
Friedrich Wilhelm von Brandenburg	Friedrich Wilhelm von Brandenburg	8 November 1848	4 December 1848	First term
Hans Adolf Karl von Bülow		4 December 1848	24 February 1849	
Heinrich Friedrich von Arnim-Heinrichsdorff-Werbelow		24 February 1849	30 April 1849	
Friedrich Wilhelm von Brandenburg	Friedrich Wilhelm von Brandenburg	30 April 1849	21 July 1849	Second term
Alexander von Schleinitz	Alexander von Schleinitz	21 July 1849	1850	Second term
Joseph von Radowitz	Joseph von Radowitz	1850	1850	
Otto Theodor von Manteuffel	Otto Theodor von Manteuffel	1850	1858	
Alexander von Schleinitz	Alexander von Schleinitz	1858	1861	Third term
Albrecht von Bernstorff	Albrecht von Bernstorff	1861	1862	
Otto von Bismarck	Otto von Bismarck	1862	1890	
Herbert von Bismarck	Herbert von Bismarck	1890	1890	
Leo von Caprivi	Leo Graf von Caprivi	1890	1894	
Adolf Marschall von Bieberstein	Adolf Marschall von Bieberstein	1894	1897	
Bernhard von Bülow	Bernhard von Bülow	1897	1909	
Theobald von Bethmann Hollweg	Theobald von Bethmann Hollweg	1909	1917	
Georg Michaelis	Georg Michaelis	1917	1917	
Georg von Hertling	Georg von Hertling	1917	1918	
Max von Baden	Maximilian von Baden	1918	1918	

== See also ==
- Foreign Minister of Germany
- Foreign Minister of Bavaria
- Minister President of Prussia
- List of interior ministers of Prussia
