= Prussian National Assembly =

1848 constitutional assembly for Prussia

Prussian National Assembly Preußische Nationalversammlung
- Coat of arms of Prussia

Type
- Type: Unicameral

History
- Established: 22 May 1848
- Disbanded: 5 December 1848
- Preceded by: Estates
- Succeeded by: Landtag

Meeting place
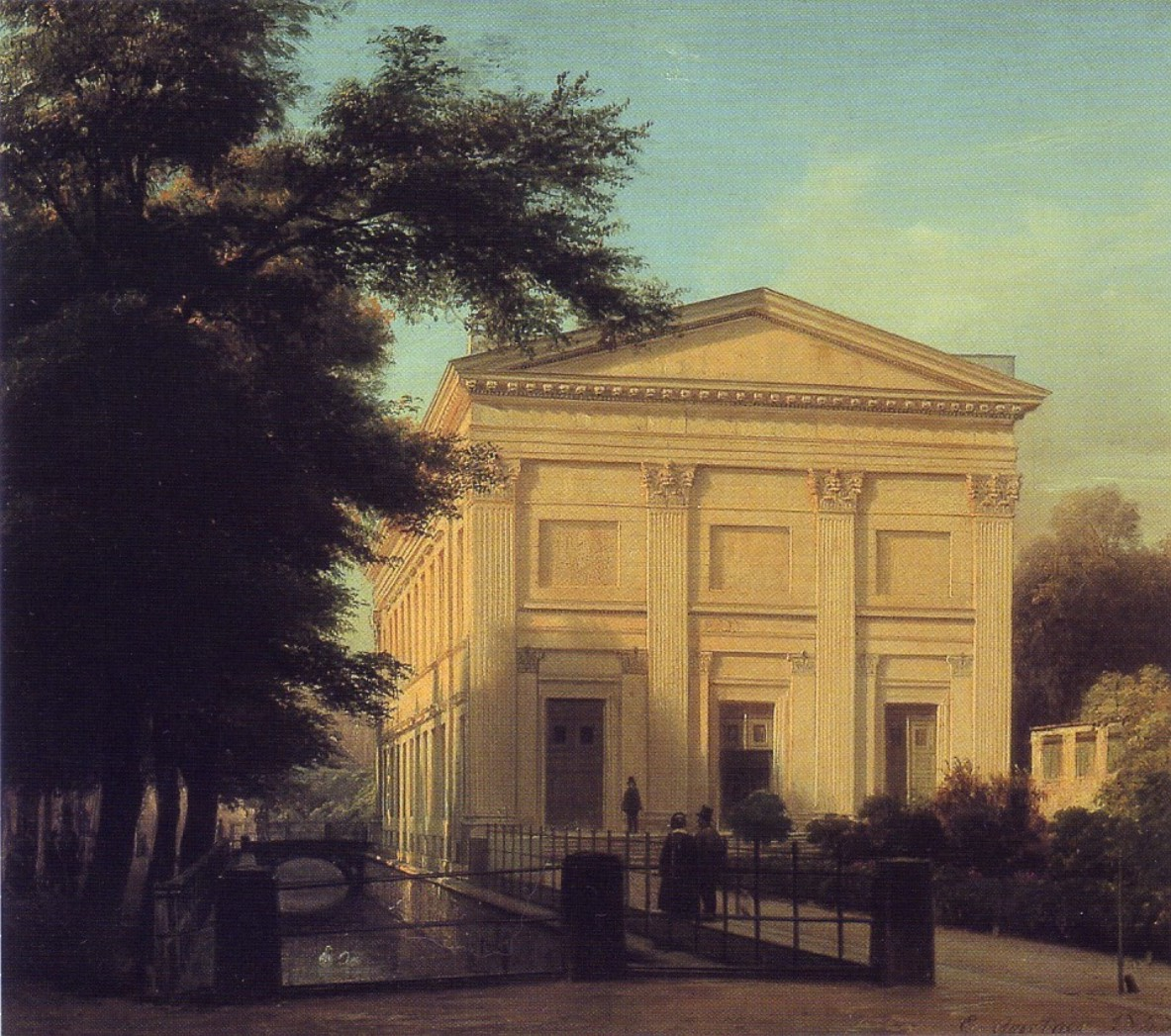
- Sing-Akademie, Berlin

The Prussian National Assembly (German: Preußische Nationalversammlung) came into being after the revolution of 1848 and was tasked with drawing up a constitution for the Kingdom of Prussia. It first met in the building of the Sing-Akademie zu Berlin (later the Maxim Gorki Theater). On 5 November 1848 the Government ordered the expulsion of the Assembly to Brandenburg an der Havel and on 5 December 1848 it was dissolved by royal decree. King Frederick William IV then unilaterally imposed the 1848 Constitution of Prussia.

== Elections and task of the National Assembly ==
The main goal of King Frederick William IV and the liberal March Ministry under Ludolf Camphausen in calling elections to the National Assembly was to steer the often spontaneous and unpredictable revolutionary movement into controllable channels by legalizing it. The reconvened United Diet decided on an "agreement [of the parliament with the king] of the Prussian constitution" as the goal of the coming National Assembly. This thus expressly forbade an independent draft by Parliament.

The electoral law provided for universal, equal, and indirect suffrage. All men over the age of 24 who had lived in their place of residence for more than six months and did not receive poor relief had the right to vote. No larger German state had a similarly broad electoral franchise as Prussia. The primary elections took place on 1 May 1848 (at the same time as those for the Frankfurt National Assembly). The electors thus determined the composition of the parliament on 8 and 10 May 1848.

== Composition ==
The composition of the parliament differed significantly from that of the Frankfurt National Assembly. Professors as well as freelance lawyers were poorly represented in Berlin; journalists, full-time publicists or writers were completely absent. Unlike in Frankfurt, Berlin's deputies included artisans, farmers (46) and large landowners (27). Judges were also more strongly represented than in Frankfurt. Similar to Frankfurt, however, public servants in the broadest sense (including teaching, administration and the judiciary) made up the largest number of members.

Overall, the National Assembly in Berlin was much more dominated by the lower middle class and less by the educated bourgeoisie than the assembly in Frankfurt. The fact that the better-known personalities in the constituencies tended to be sent to Frankfurt played a role. By contrast, the Berlin deputies were considered closer to the people.
