= List of war ministers of Prussia =

Government official in Prussia

This page lists Prussian Ministers of War.

== War ministers ==
† denotes people who died in office.

No.	Portrait	Minister	Took office	Left office	Time in office
1	Gerhard von Scharnhorst	Gerhard von Scharnhorst (1755–1813)	1 March 1808	17 June 1810	2 years, 108 days
2	Karl von Hake	Karl von Hake (1768–1835)	17 June 1810	August 1813	3 years, 1 month
3	Hermann von Boyen	Hermann von Boyen (1771–1848)	3 June 1813	26 December 1819	6 years, 206 days
4	Karl von Hake	Karl von Hake (1768–1835)	26 December 1819	20 October 1833	13 years, 298 days
5	Job von Witzleben	Job von Witzleben (1783–1837)	25 April 1835	April 1837	1 year, 341 days
6	Gustav von Rauch	Gustav von Rauch (1774–1841)	30 July 1837	28 February 1841	3 years, 213 days
7	Hermann von Boyen	Hermann von Boyen (1771–1848)	1 March 1841	6 October 1847	6 years, 219 days
8	Ferdinand von Rohr	Ferdinand von Rohr (1782–1851)	6 October 1847	2 April 1848	179 days
9	Karl von Reyher	Karl von Reyher (1786–1857)	2 April 1848	26 April 1848	24 days
10	August Wilhelm Graf von Kanitz	August Wilhelm Graf von Kanitz (1783–1852)	26 April 1848	16 June 1848	51 days
11	Ludwig Freiherr Roth von Schreckenstein	Ludwig Freiherr Roth von Schreckenstein (1789–1858)	16 June 1848	7 September 1848	83 days
12	Ernst von Pfuel	Ernst von Pfuel (1779–1866)	7 September 1848	2 November 1848	56 days
13	Karl von Strotha	Karl von Strotha (1786–1870)	2 November 1848	27 February 1850	1 year, 117 days
14	August von Stockhausen	August von Stockhausen (1791–1861)	27 February 1850	31 December 1851	1 year, 307 days
15	Eduard von Bonin	Eduard von Bonin (1793–1865)	31 December 1851	1854	3 years
16	Friedrich Graf von Waldersee	Friedrich Graf von Waldersee (1795–1864)	1854	6 November 1858	4 years
17	Eduard von Bonin	Eduard von Bonin (1793–1865)	6 November 1858	28 November 1859	1 year, 22 days
18	Albrecht von Roon	Albrecht von Roon (1803–1879)	5 December 1859	9 November 1873	13 years, 339 days
19	Georg von Kameke	Georg von Kameke (1817–1893)	9 November 1873	3 March 1883	9 years, 114 days
20	Paul Bronsart von Schellendorff	Paul Bronsart von Schellendorff (1832–1891)	3 March 1883	8 April 1889	6 years, 36 days
21	Julius von Verdy du Vernois	Julius von Verdy du Vernois (1832–1910)	8 April 1889	4 October 1890	1 year, 179 days
22	Hans von Kaltenborn-Stachau	Hans von Kaltenborn-Stachau (1836–1898)	4 October 1890	19 October 1893	3 years, 15 days
23	Walther Bronsart von Schellendorff	Walther Bronsart von Schellendorff (1833–1914) (Note: Younger brother of Paul Bronsart von Schellendorff.)	19 October 1893	14 August 1896	2 years, 300 days
24	Heinrich von Gossler	Heinrich von Gossler (1841–1927)	14 August 1896	15 August 1903	7 years, 1 day
25	Karl von Einem	Karl von Einem (1853–1934)	15 August 1903	11 August 1909	5 years, 361 days
26	Josias von Heeringen	Josias von Heeringen (1850–1926)	11 August 1909	7 June 1913	3 years, 300 days
27	Erich von Falkenhayn	Erich von Falkenhayn (1861–1922)	7 June 1913	21 January 1915	1 year, 228 days
28	Adolf Wild von Hohenborn	Adolf Wild von Hohenborn (1860–1925)	21 January 1915	29 October 1916	1 year, 282 days
29	Hermann von Stein	Hermann von Stein (1854–1927)	29 October 1916	9 October 1918	1 year, 345 days
30	Heinrich Scheuch	Heinrich Scheuch (1864–1946)	9 October 1918	2 January 1919	85 days
31	Walther Reinhardt	Walther Reinhardt (1872–1930)	2 January 1919	13 September 1919	254 days

For further succession, see List of German defence ministers.
