= 1st Division (German Empire) =

1st Division 1st Infantry Division
- 1. Division; 1. Infanterie-Division
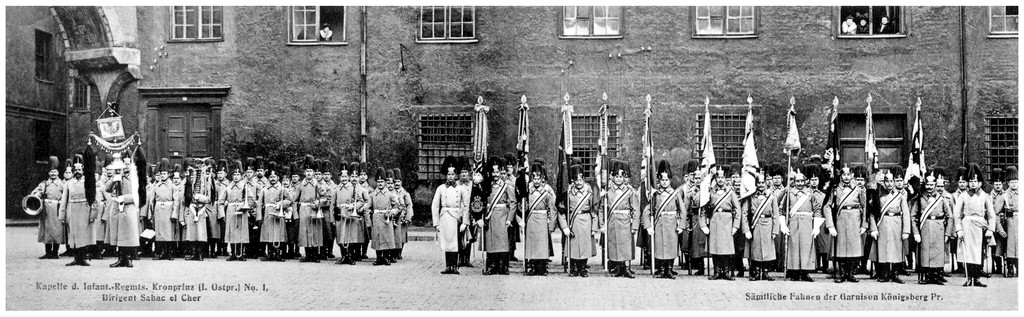
- Active: 1818–1919
- Countries: Prussia; German Empire
- Branch: Prussian Army; Imperial German Army
- Type: Infantry
- Size: Division (Approx. 10,000)
- Part of: I Army Corps (I. Armeekorps)
- Garrison/HQ: Königsberg (1818–1919)
- Engagements: Austro-Prussian War: Trutnov; Königgrätz; Franco-Prussian War: Noisseville; Gravelotte; Metz; Amiens; Hallue; St. Quentin; World War I: Stallupönen; Gumbinnen; Tannenberg; 1st Masurian Lakes; Łódź; Gorlice–Tarnów Offensive; Verdun; German spring offensive; Second Marne; Hindenburg Line

Commanders
- Notable commanders: August Wilhelm Graf von Kanitz; August von Stockhausen; Karl Friedrich von Steinmetz; Julius von Verdy du Vernois

The 1st Division (1. Division) was a unit of the Prussian/German Army. It was formed in Königsberg in March 1816 as a Troop Brigade (Truppen-Brigade). It became the 1st Division on September 5, 1818. From the corps' formation in 1820, the division was subordinated in peacetime to I Army Corps (I. Armeekorps). The 1st Division was disbanded in 1919, during the demobilization of the German Army after World War I.

The 1st Division and its regiments fought in the Austro-Prussian War against Austria in 1866, including the Battle of Königgrätz. The division then fought in the Franco-Prussian War against France in 1870–71. Its regiments saw action in the Battle of Noisseville, the Battle of Gravelotte, the Siege of Metz, the Battle of Amiens, the Battle of Hallue, and the Battle of St. Quentin, among other actions.

In World War I, the division initially served on the Eastern Front, seeing action at the battles of Stallupönen, Gumbinnen, and Tannenberg, and the First Battle of the Masurian Lakes. The division then fought in the Battle of Łódź and in the Gorlice–Tarnów Offensive of 1915. In March 1916, the 1st Infantry Division was transferred to the Western Front. One month later, it entered the Battle of Verdun. After several months' hard fighting around Fort Vaux, the division was withdrawn from the line and returned to the Eastern Front, where it arrived in August 1916. It then participated in the invasion of Romania, which had entered the war in 1916 on the Allied side. The division returned to Verdun at the end of 1917. In 1918, it took part in the German spring offensive, which the Germans referred to as the Kaiserschlacht, the Second Battle of the Marne, and the Battle of the Hindenburg Line.

== 1870 organization ==
During wartime, the 1st Division, like other German divisions, was redesignated an infantry division. The organization of the 1st Infantry Division in 1870 at the beginning of the Franco-Prussian War was as follows:

- 1st Infantry Brigade (1. Infanterie-Brigade)
  - 1st Grenadier Regiment "Crown Prince" (1st East Prussian) (Grenadier-Regiment Kronprinz (1. Ostpreußisches) Nr. 1)
  - 5th East Prussian Infantry Regiment No. 41 (5. Ostpreußisches Infanterie-Regiment Nr. 41)
- 2nd Infantry Brigade (2. Infanterie-Brigade)
  - 2nd East Prussian Grenadier Regiment No. 3 (2. Ostpreußisches Grenadier-Regiment Nr. 3)
  - 6th East Prussian Infantry Regiment No. 43 (6. Ostpreußisches Infanterie-Regiment Nr. 43)
- 1st Dragoon Regiment (Dragoner-Regiment Nr. 1)
- 1st Jäger Battalion (Jäger-Bataillon Nr. 1)

== Pre-World War I organization ==
Many regiments were renamed and assigned to different divisions during the period from 1871 to 1914. In 1914, the peacetime organization of the 1st Division was as follows:

- 1st Infantry Brigade (1. Infanterie-Brigade)
  - 1st Grenadier Regiment "Crown Prince" (1st East Prussian) (Grenadier-Regiment Kronprinz (1. Ostpreußisches) Nr. 1)
  - 41st Infantry Regiment "von Boyen" (5th East Prussian) (Infanterie-Regiment von Boyen (5. Ostpreuß.) Nr. 41)
- 2nd Infantry Brigade (2. Infanterie-Brigade)
  - 3rd Grenadier Regiment "King Friedrich Wilhelm I" (2nd East Prussian) (Grenadier-Regiment König Friedrich Wilhelm I (2. Ostpreuß.) Nr. 3)
  - 43rd Infantry Regiment "Duke Karl of Mecklenburg" (6th East Prussian) (Infanterie-Regiment Herzog Karl von Mecklenburg (6. Ostpreuß.) Nr. 43)
- 1st Cavalry Brigade (1. Kavallerie-Brigade)
  - 3rd Cuirassier Regiment "Count Wrangel" (East Prussian) (3. Kürassier-Regiment Graf Wrangel (Ostpreuß.)
  - 1st Lithuanian Dragoon Regiment "Prince Albrecht of Prussia" (Dragoner-Regiment Prinz Albrecht von Preußen (Litthau.) Nr. 1)
- 1st Field Artillery Brigade (1. Feldartillerie-Brigade)
  - 16th Field Artillery Regiment (1st East Prussian) (Feldartillerie-Regiment (1. Ostpreuß.) Nr. 16)
  - 52nd Field Artillery Regiment (2nd East Prussian) (Feldartillerie-Regiment (2. Ostpreuß.) Nr. 52)

== August 1914 organization ==
On mobilization in August 1914, at the beginning of World War I, most divisional cavalry, including brigade headquarters, was withdrawn to form cavalry divisions or split up among divisions as reconnaissance units. Divisions received engineer companies and other support units from their higher headquarters. The 1st Division was again renamed the 1st Infantry Division. Its initial wartime organization (major units) was as follows:

- 1st Infantry Brigade (1. Infanterie-Brigade)
  - 1st Grenadier Regiment "Crown Prince" (1st East Prussian) (Grenadier-Regiment Kronprinz (1. Ostpreußisches) Nr. 1)
  - 41st Infantry Regiment "von Boyen" (5th East Prussian) (Infanterie-Regiment von Boyen (5. Ostpreuß.) Nr. 41)
- 2nd Infantry Brigade (2. Infanterie-Brigade)
  - 3rd Grenadier Regiment "King Friedrich Wilhelm I" (2nd East Prussian) (Grenadier-Regiment König Friedrich Wilhelm I (2. Ostpreuß.) Nr. 3)
  - 43rd Infantry Regiment "Duke Karl of Mecklenburg" (6th East Prussian) (Infanterie-Regiment Herzog Karl von Mecklenburg (6. Ostpreuß.) Nr. 43)
- 8th Uhlan Regiment "Count zu Dohna" (East Prussian) (Ulanen-Regiment Graf zu Dohna (Ostpreußisches) Nr. 8)
- 1st Field Artillery Brigade (1. Feldartillerie-Brigade)
  - 16th Field Artillery Regiment (1st East Prussian) (Feldartillerie-Regiment (1. Ostpreuß.) Nr. 16)
  - 52nd Field Artillery Regiment (2nd East Prussian) (Feldartillerie-Regiment (2. Ostpreuß.) Nr. 52)
- 1st Company, 1st Engineer Battalion "Prince Radziwill" (East Prussian) (1./Pionier-Bataillon Prinz Radziwill (Ostpreuß.) Nr. 1)

== Late World War I organization ==
Divisions underwent many changes during the war, with regiments moving from division to division, and some being destroyed and rebuilt. During the war, most divisions became triangular - one infantry brigade with three infantry regiments rather than two infantry brigades of two regiments (a "square division"). An artillery commander replaced the artillery brigade headquarters, the cavalry was further reduced, the engineer contingent was increased, and a divisional signals command was created. The 1st Infantry Division's order of battle on February 19, 1918, was as follows:

- 1st Infantry Brigade (1. Infanterie-Brigade)
  - 1st Grenadier Regiment "Crown Prince" (1st East Prussian) (Grenadier-Regiment Kronprinz (1. Ostpreußisches) Nr. 1)
  - 3rd Grenadier Regiment "King Friedrich Wilhelm I" (2nd East Prussian) (Grenadier-Regiment König Friedrich Wilhelm I (2. Ostpreuß.) Nr. 3)
  - 43rd Infantry Regiment "Duke Karl of Mecklenburg" (6th East Prussian) (Infanterie-Regiment Herzog Karl von Mecklenburg (6. Ostpreuß.) Nr. 43)
  - 31st Machine Gun Sharpshooter Detachment (MG-Scharfschützen-Abteilung Nr. 31)
- 3rd Squadron, 8th Uhlan Regiment "Count zu Dohna" (East Prussian) (3.Esk./Ulanen-Regiment Graf zu Dohna (Ostpreußisches) Nr. 8)
- Artillery Commander No. 1 (Artillerie-Kommandeur 1)
  - 16th Field Artillery Regiment (1st East Prussian) (Feldartillerie-Regiment (1. Ostpreuß.) Nr. 16)
  - 1st Battalion, 10th Lower Saxon Foot Artillery Regiment (I.Bataillon/Niedersächsiches Fußartillerie-Regiment Nr. 10)
- Staff, 110th Engineer Battalion (Stab Pionier-Bataillon Nr. 110)
  - 3rd Company, 1st Engineer Battalion "Prince Radziwill" (East Prussian) (2./Pionier-Bataillon Prinz Radziwill (Ostpreuß.) Nr. 1)
  - 271st Engineer Company (Pionier-Kompanie Nr. 271)
  - 1st Mortar Company (Minenwerfer-Kompanie Nr. 1)
- Divisional Signals Commander No. 1 (Divisions-Nachrichten-Kommandeur 1)

== Notable commanders ==
- August Wilhelm Graf von Kanitz (1839–1842) - later Prussian Minister of War (1848)
- August von Stockhausen (1848) - later Prussian Minister of War (1850–1851)
- Karl Friedrich von Steinmetz (1857–1863) - later a Generalfeldmarschall
- Julius von Verdy du Vernois (1883–1887) - military theorist, Prussian Minister of War (1889–1890)
