= Kanitz =

Kanitz may refer to:

== People ==
- August Kanitz (1843–1896), Hungarian botanist
- August Wilhelm Graf von Kanitz (1783–1852), Prussian Lieutenant General and Minister of War
- Ernest Kanitz (1894–1978), composer; see Houston Bright
- Felix Philipp Kanitz (1829–1904), Austro-Hungarian naturalist, geographer, ethnographer, and author
- Gerhard von Kanitz (1885–1949), German politician
- Hans von Kanitz (1841–1913), German politician
- Katrin Kanitz, German pair skater
- Miklos Kanitz (1939–2006), Hungarian-Canadian Holocaust survivor
- Otto Felix Kanitz (1894–1940), Austrian socialist, journalist and educator
- Steffen Kanitz (born 1984), German politician
- Stephen Kanitz (1946–2025), Brazilian business consultant, lecturer, academic and writer

== Other uses ==
- Kanitz v. Rogers Cable Inc.
- German name of Dolní Kounice, Czech Republic
- German name of Olszewo Węgorzewskie, Poland
