= Bronsart von Schellendorff =

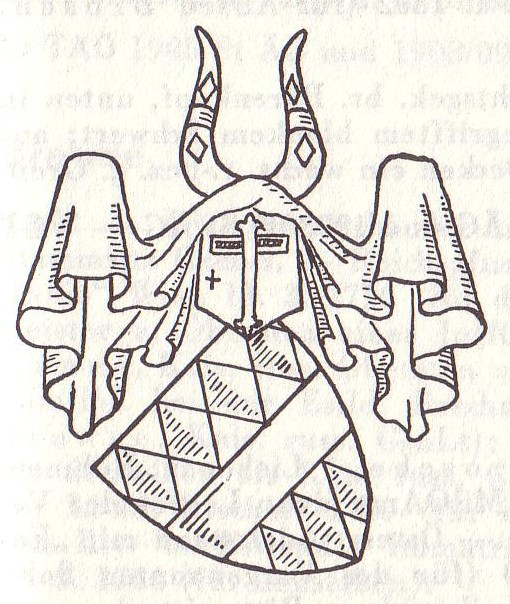
Coat of Arms of the german family Bronsart von Schellendorff

Bronsart von Schellendorff or Bronsart von Schellendorf is a surname. Notable people with the surname include:

- Fritz Bronsart von Schellendorf (1864–1942), German officer and politician
- Hans Bronsart von Schellendorff (1830–1913), classical musician and composer who studied under Franz Liszt
- Heinrich-Walter Bronsart von Schellendorff (1906–1944), highly decorated Generalmajor in the Wehrmacht during World War II
- Huberta Bronsart von Schellendorff (1892–1978), German biologist and astronomer
- Ingeborg Bronsart von Schellendorf, (born 1840), Swedish-German composer
- Paul Bronsart von Schellendorff (1832–1891), Prussian general and writer
- Walther Bronsart von Schellendorff (1833–1914), Prussian Minister of War
