= Camphausen cabinet =

Camphausen Cabinet
- Cabinet of the Kingdom of Prussia
- 1848–1848
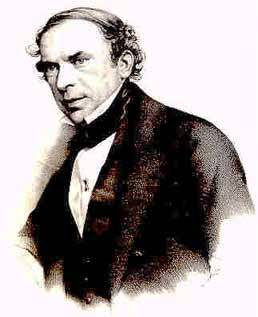
- Minister President Camphausen
- Date formed: March 29, 1848
- Date dissolved: June 20, 1848 (2 months, 3 weeks and 1 day)

People and organisations
- King: Frederick William IV
- Minister President: Gottfried Camphausen

History
- Predecessor: Arnim-Boitzenburg cabinet
- Successor: Auerswald cabinet

The Camphausen Cabinet formed the Prussian State Ministry appointed by King Frederick William IV from March 29 to June 20, 1848. This is a March government set up in the course of the March Revolution, which came into power with the aim of liberal reforms and the creation of a constitution for Prussia. With her mediating course, she came into conflict with both the King and the Prussian National Assembly and had to resign after the failed storming of the armory in Berlin. The ministers continued their work until the Auerswald cabinet was formed on June 25, 1848.

== Cabinet members ==
Office	Name	Notes
Minister President	Gottfried Ludolf Camphausen	
Foreign Affairs	Heinrich Alexander von Arnim (March 29 – June 19, 1848); Alexander von Schleinitz (from June 19, 1848)	
Finance	David Hanseman	
Spiritual, Educational and Medical Affairs	Maximilian von Schwerin-Putzar	
Justice	Wilhelm Bornemann	
Trade, Commerce and Public Works	Robert von Patow (interim from April 17, 1848)	
Interior Affairs	Alfred von Auerswald	
War	Karl von Reyher (interim March 29 - April 26, 1848); August von Kanitz (April 26 - June 16, 1848); Ludwig Roth von Schockenstein (from June 16, 1848)	

== See also ==
- Prussian State Ministry
