= Gerhard von Kanitz =

German politician

Gerhard Graf von Kanitz
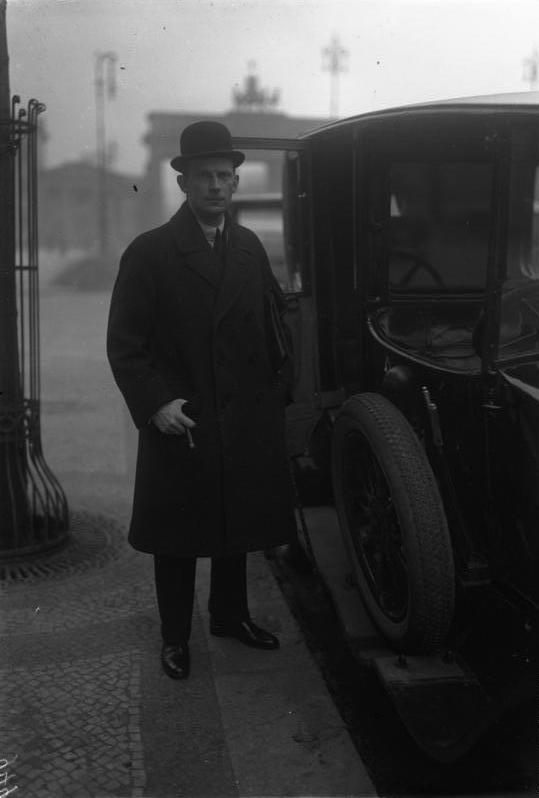
- Gerhard von Kanitz in 1925

Prussian National Assembly
- In office 1919–1921
- Constituency: East Prussia

Reichstag (Weimar Republic)
- In office 1921–1924
- Constituency: East Prussia

Minister of Food and Agriculture
- In office 6 October 1923 – 19 January 1926

Landtag of Prussia
- In office 1928–1932
- Constituency: East Prussia

East Prussian Landtag
- In office 1929–1933
- Constituency: Pr. Holland

Personal details
- Born: 9 April 1884 Podangen, East Prussia, German Empire (Podągi, Poland)
- Died: 13 June 1949 (aged 64) Frankfurt–Sossenheim, Germany
- Party: German National People's Party (DNVP); German People's Party (DVP)
- Spouse: Valeska von Tiele-Winckler (1893–1949)

Gerhard Theodor Alexander Graf von Kanitz (9 April 1884 – 13 June 1949) was a German politician of the German National People's Party (DNVP) and the German People's Party (DVP). He was a member of several Prussian and German Parliaments and served as Weimar Germany's Minister of Food and Agriculture from 1923 to 1926

== Biography ==
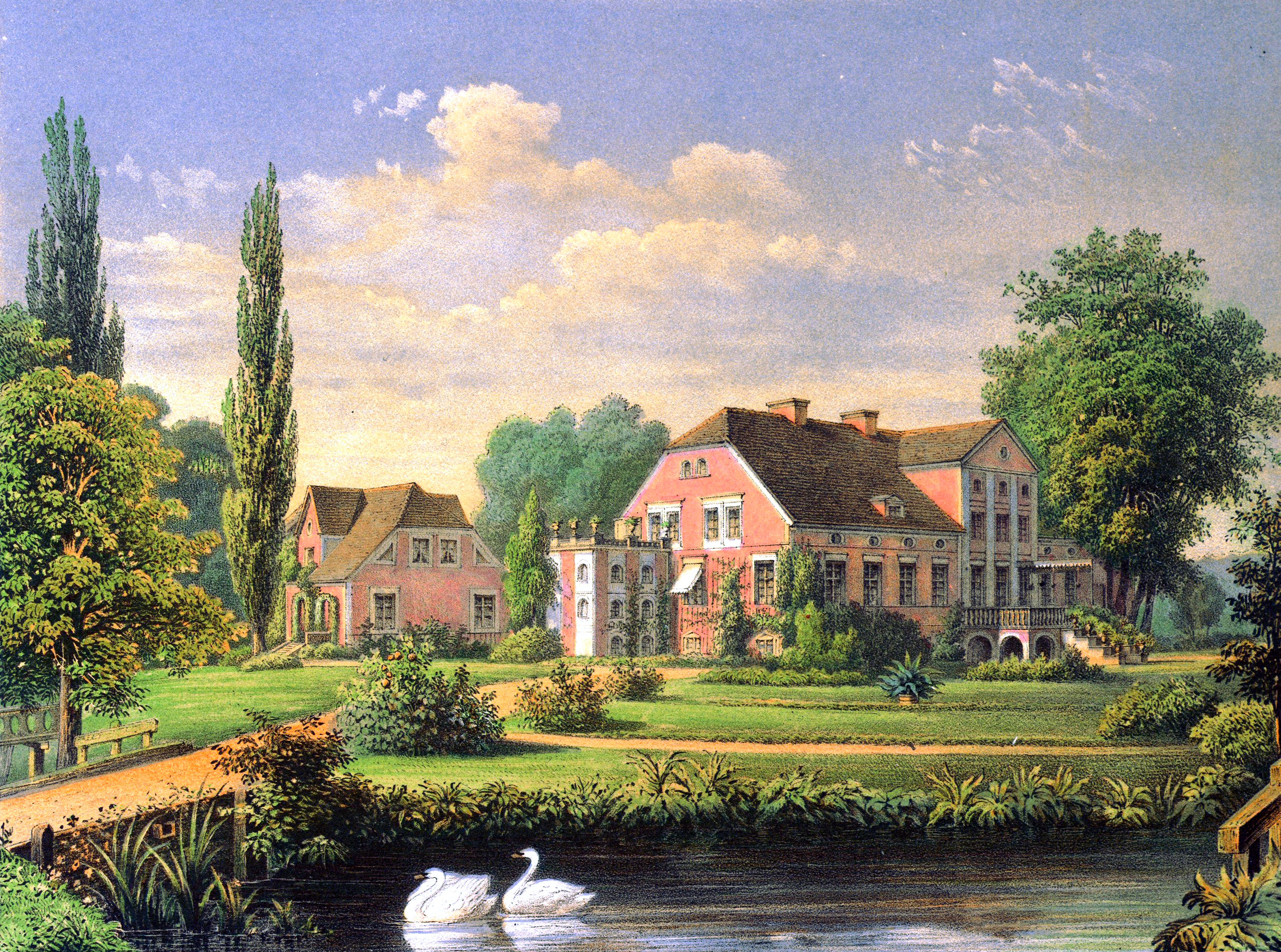
Castle Podangen, Alexander Duncker

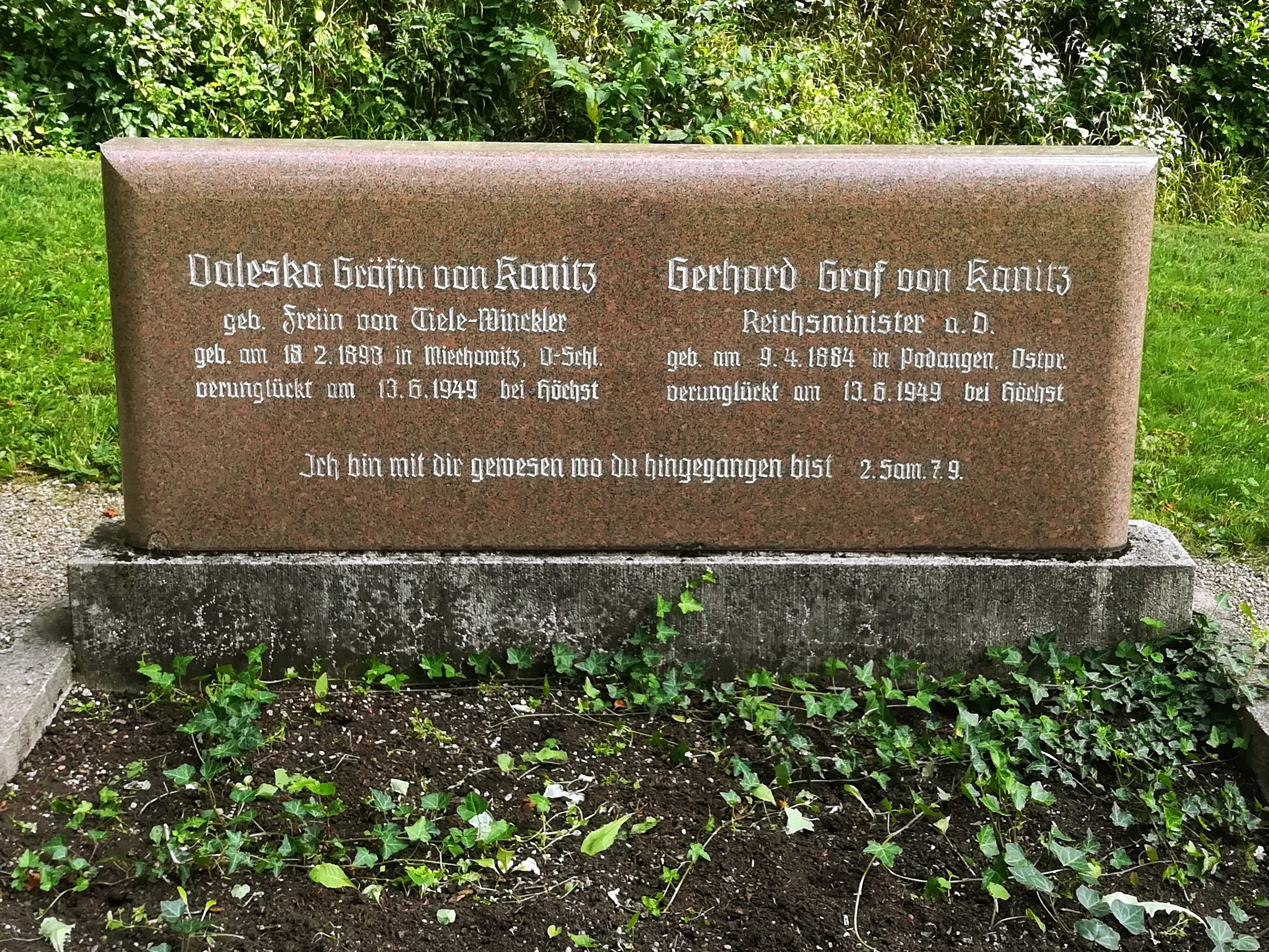
Grave of Valeska and Gerhard von Kanitz

Kanitz was born in Podangen, East Prussia (current-day Podągi, Poland), the son of the conservative politician Hans von Kanitz. He attended the Wilhelmgymnasium in Königsberg and served in the 3rd (East Prussian) Cuirassiers "Count Wrangel". Kanitz took over his family estate at Podangen after his father's death in 1913

Following his service in World War I he became chairman of the agricultural association in the district of Preußisch Holland (Pasłęk) and member of the provisional German economic council (Vorläufiger Reichswirtschaftsrat). He joined the DNVP after the German Revolution of 1918–1919 but left the party in 1923; later on he joined the German People's Party (DVP).

From 1919 to 1921, Kanitz was a member of the Prussian Constitutional Assembly, and a member of the Weimar Reichstag from 7 March 1921 until May 1924 representing the constituency of East Prussia. From 1928 to 1932, he represented the DVP in the Landtag of Prussia and, from 1929 to 1933, he was a member of the East Prussian provincial parliament.

Kanitz served as Minister of Food and Agriculture from 6 October 1923 to 19 January 1926 in the Second Stresemann cabinet, the First and Second Marx cabinet and the First Luther cabinet.

Kanitz died in 1949 in Frankfurt-Sossenheim.

== Family ==
Kanitz married Valeska Freiin von Tiele-Winckler (1893–1949) in 1912.
