= Huberta von Bronsart =

German biologist, astronomer

- Born: 9 October 1892; Marienhof, Germany
- Died: 18 July 1978 (aged 85); Rottweil, Germany
- Education: Heidelberg University
- Occupations: Biologist, botanist, astronomer
- Father: Friedrich Bronsart von Schellendorf

Harriet Helene Veronika Xenia Huberta Bronsart von Schellendorff (9 October 1892 – 18 July 1978) was a German biologist and botanist. She was also the first woman in Germany to study astronomy and helped establish the public observatory in Stuttgart.

== Life and work ==
Von Bronsart was the daughter of the later lieutenant general and chief of staff of the Turkish army Friedrich Bronsart von Schellendorf, an officer from the old Prussian Bronsart von Schellendorf family, and his cousin and wife Veronika. She was born on the Mecklenburg estate Marienhof, owned by her grandfather and general Walther Bronsart von Schellendorf.

She studied natural sciences at Heidelberg University from 1915 to 1918 (first astronomy, then mainly biology). She received her doctorate there in 1919 with the dissertation Comparative study of three Xylaria species on a genus of sac fungi. She then worked as a biologist in horticulture as an assistant at the University of Hohenheim (1923) and as a bookseller and consultant on horticultural matters.

As early as 1922–1923 von Bronsart was one of the founders of the Stuttgart public observatory (where she worked again in the 1950s). She took photos of sunspots. She worked with the first female professor at Hohenheim, chemist Margarete von Wrangell, who developed special fertilizing methods for plant nutrition.

In 1933, during the Nazi era, von Bronsart was expelled from the University of Hohenheim. When she then found work as a freelancer at the publisher Franckh-Kosmos-Verlag, she was taken into "protective custody" and put in jail for political reasons in 1934 and 1940. For a long time she worked in a factory, 1943–1945 in research to ensure nutrition with products from horticulture. She was a frequent guest in the family and in the business of Gertrud Franck, who inspired her in the mixed culture of gardening (Healthy garden through mixed culture).

After 1945, she was mainly active as a journalist and publicist and published numerous essays and popular science books in the fields of botany and horticulture and astronomy. Her book Little Biography of the Constellations, which became well-known, also dealt with the history of astronomy.

From 1956 to around 1970 von Bronsart was a member of the German Astronomical Society (Astronomische Gesellschaft).

== Selected works ==
- The bacteria, Hohenheim 1923
- The life lesson of the present. Introduction to objective philosophy, Stuttgart 1924
- Procreation miracle. The Love Life of Plants, 1925, ND 2012 ISBN 978-3-8460-0363-3
- Plant growth and migration: A plant physiology, Ullstein, Berlin 1927
- With M.V. Wrangell: Flower coloration and nitrogen fertilization. In: Naturwissenschaften, 16, pp. 169–172 (1928). doi:10.1007/BF01513203
- The Student of Today, 1929
- The Girl and the Youth Movement, Deutsches Adelsblatt, 1929
- Modern fertilization b. Biological Fertilization, 1941
- My Own Vegetable Garden, 1946
- Modern fertilization, Stuttgart 1949
- Houseplants, Bern 1953
- Astronomy for Lovers, 1956
- Youth at the Telescope, 1958
- Almanac of Plants, Stuttgart 1957
- Outer Space, 1960
- HERDERS garden book, It grows and blooms for you, Basel-Freiburg/Br.-Vienna 1960 and above.
- Small biography of the constellations, Stuttgart 1963
