= Arnim-Boitzenburg cabinet =

Arnim-Boitzenburg Cabinet
- Cabinet of the Kingdom of Prussia
- 1848–1848
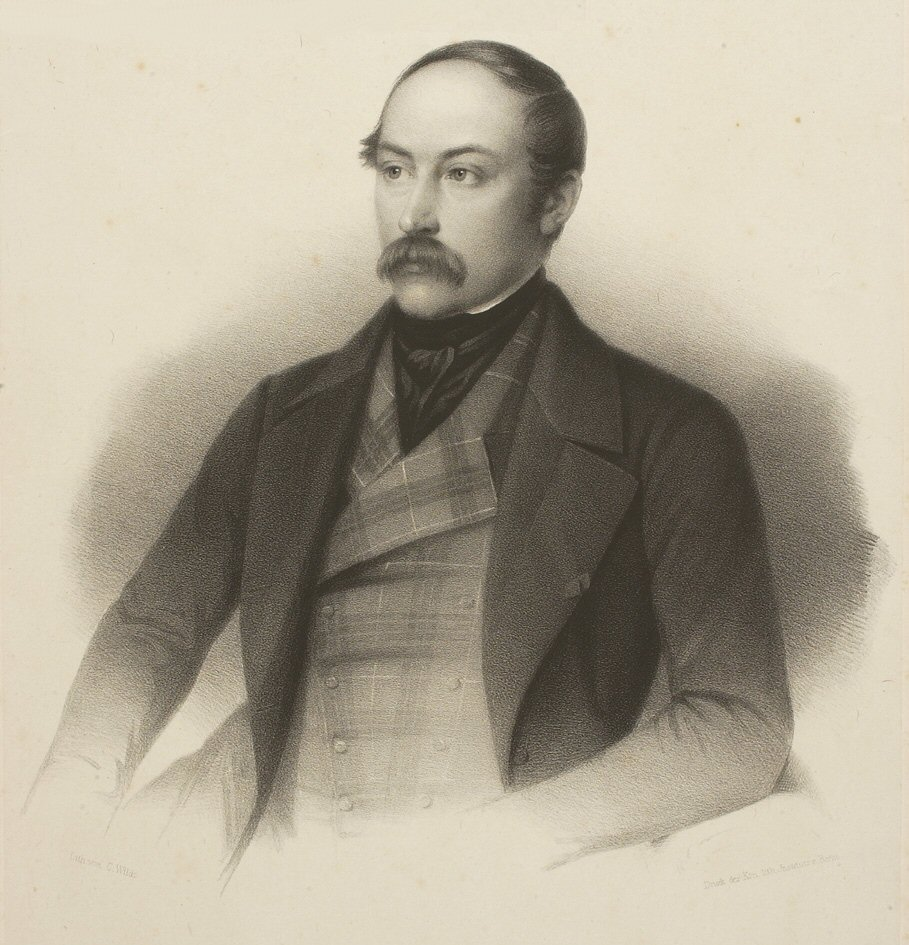
- Minister President von Arnim-Boitzenburg
- Date formed: 18 March 1848
- Date dissolved: 29 March 1848 (1 week and 4 days)

People and organisations
- King: Frederick William IV
- Minister President: Adolf von Arnim-Boitzenburg

History
- Successor: Camphausen cabinet

The Arnim-Boitzenburg Cabinet formed the Prussian State Ministry appointed by King Frederick William IV from 18 to 29 March 1848. The office of Prussian Prime Minister was newly created. The establishment of this liberal-conservative government was the King's attempt to meet the challenges of the March Revolution through slight reforms, which failed after just eleven days.

== Cabinet members ==
Office	Name	Notes
Minister President	Adolf Heinrich von Arnim-Boitzenburg	
Foreign Affairs	Heinrich Alexander von Arnim-Suckow	
Finance	Ludwig Samuel Kühne	Interim administrator
Spiritual, Educational and Medical Affairs	Maximilian von Schwerin-Putzar	
Justice	Alexander von Uhden (18–20 March 1848); Wilhelm Bornemann (from 20 March 1848)	
Law Revision	Friedrich Carl von Savigny (18–20 March 1848)	Afterwards part of the Ministry of Justice
Interior Affairs	Alfred von Auerswald	
War	Wilhelm Eugen Ludwig Ferdinand von Rohr	
Privy Minister of State	Anton zu Stolberg-Wernigerode (18–20 March 1848)	

== See also ==
- Prussian State Ministry
