= Gilbert Hamilton =

Swedish noble and soldier (1869–1947)

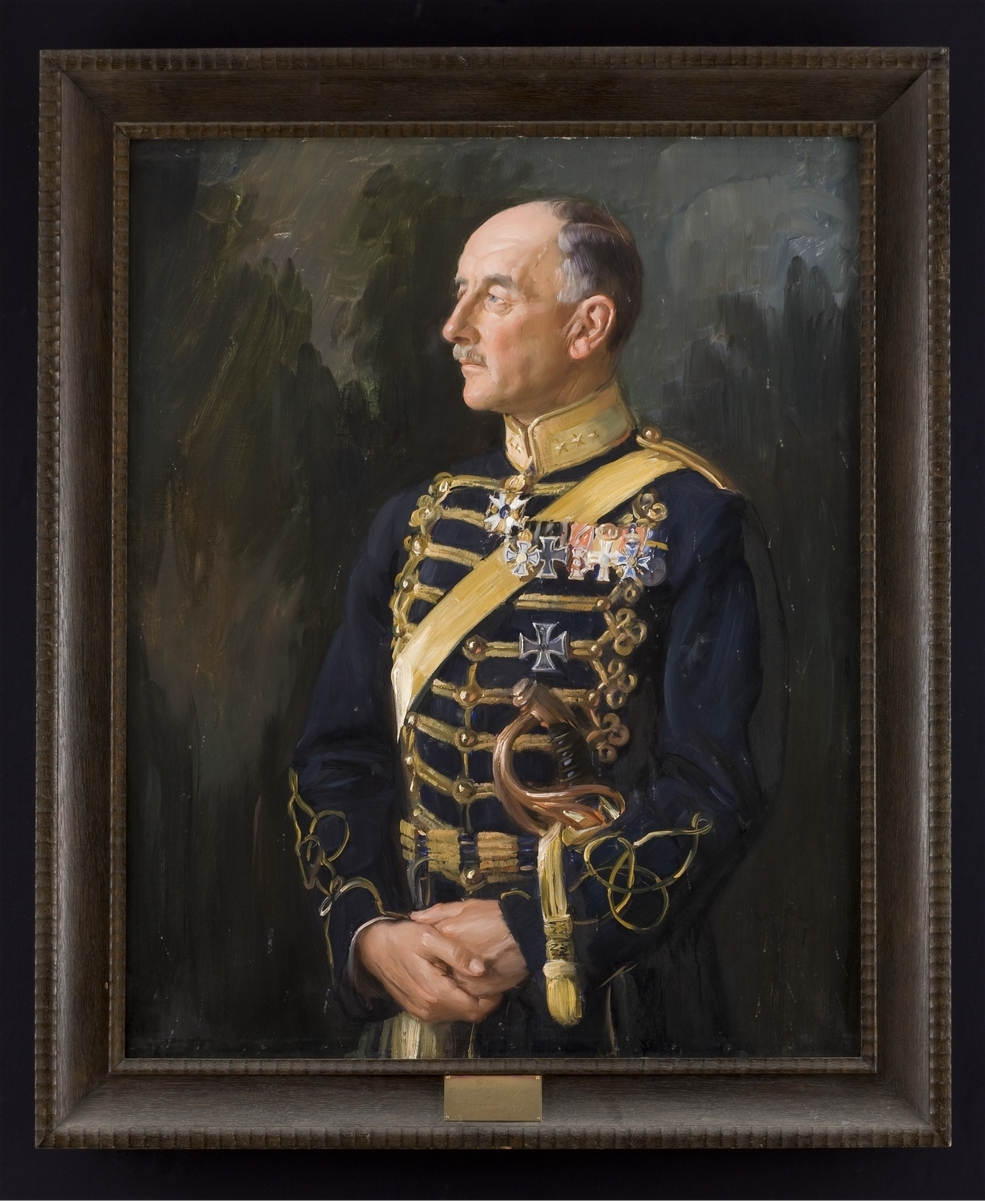
- Painting of Gilbert Hamilton, c. 1927
- Born: Gustaf David Gilbert John William Hamilton; 20 March 1869; Tillberga, Sweden
- Died: 14 October 1947 (aged 78); Linköping, Sweden
- Spouses: Marguerite von Seüme (m. 1898; div. 1921) Elin Catharina Liberg (m. 1921; div. 1930) (m. 1932; div. 1939) Elsa Schumburg (m. 1941)
- Children: Felix Hamilton (1899–1959); Daisy Hamilton (1901–????); Gerald Hamilton (1904–1979)
- Military career
- Allegiance: Sweden (1894–1914, 1920–1940); German Empire (1918–1920)
- Branch: Swedish Army; Imperial German Army
- Service years: 1894–1940
- Rank: Colonel; Generalmajor
- Unit: Life Guards of Horse
- Commands: 3rd Cuirassiers "Count Wrangel"; Småland Hussars
- Conflicts: World War I; Battle of Tannenberg; Carpathian Front; Finnish Civil War
- Awards: Iron Cross, First Class; Commander of the Royal Order of the Sword

Signature
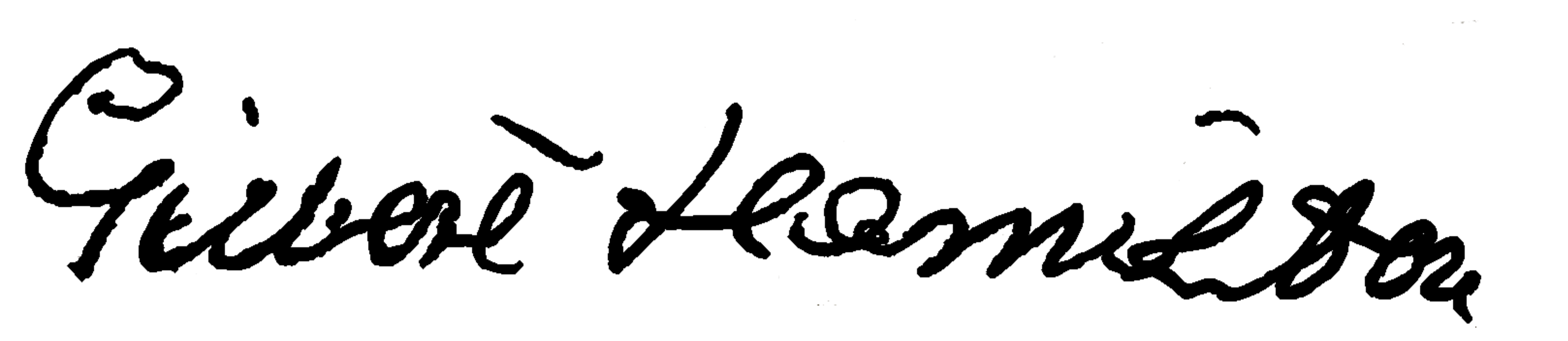

Count Gustaf David Gilbert John William Hamilton (20 March 1869 – 11 August 1947) was a highly decorated Swedish soldier and noble who served in the Imperial German Army during World War I and served as commander of the 3rd (East Prussian) Cuirassiers "Count Wrangel.". Following the war, Hamilton resumed active service in the Swedish Army, reaching the rank of Colonel.

== Early career ==
Gilbert was born on 20 March 1869 in Hedensberg manor, Västmanland. He was the second son of Count Gustaf Malcolm Hamilton and his wife, Baroness Sophia Lovisa Barnekow. His father was a Fideicommissum to Hedensberg, a post that his older brother Hugo Hamilton would later take over following their father's death.

Gilbert started off his military career in 1891 when he graduated from Karlberg with the rank of second lieutenant. Gilbert tried to volunteer in the Greco-Turkish War in 1897 but was denied. He also tried to, but was denied entry into both the Second Boer War (1899) and later the Russo-Japanese War (1904).

By the time of the start of the First World War, Hamilton was already a rittmeister (captain) in the Swedish Army and at the time held command as chief of the 2nd Squadron in the Royal Life Guards situated in Stockholm.

== World War I ==
On 27 October 1914, Hamilton took discharge and left for Germany. There he joined the German Army and went into Prussian service with the rank of Major. He served on the eastern front and took part in, among others, the famous Battle at Tannenberg, which was a total German victory. He served as a cavalry officer and later as a squadron leader on the Austro-Hungarian Carpathian Front. Between the years 1915–18 he commanded the 22nd reserve jaeger battalion, which, at the time, was stationed between Belarus and Ukraine, directly north of the city of Pinsk. In 1918 he took part in the Finnish Civil War as part of the much larger conflict, the Russian Civil War, fighting for the whites against the reds. He did this as Commander of the Squadron "Hamilton" under the Brandenstein brigade as part of the German Expeditionary Corps, Die Ostseedivision.

In June 1918 he was made commander of the 3rd Cuirassier regiment "Graf Wrangel" in southern Ukraine. When the Kaiser abdicated and went into exile in Holland, a revolution had broken out across Germany. At Christmas 1918, he was forced to make a 100-mile-long march, comparable to those which the Caroleans undertook 200 years earlier. They made their journey via Kiev all the way back to Königsberg, during which they were constantly attacked in skirmishes. On 20 February 1919, they finally arrived in Königsberg and were received with cheers and a hero's welcome by the populace of the city.

== Later life ==
After his return to Sweden in 1920, he was given command of the Småland hussars in Eksjö in 1921. Besides his military career he served as an adjutant to the exiled Kaiser Wilhelm II in Doorn for several weeks each year.

On the 25th anniversary of the German victory at Tannenberg, during a ceremony on 25 August 1939, Adolf Hitler personally appointed him honorary General of the Wehrmacht, with the rank of Generalmajor in the Reserve.

== Gallery ==
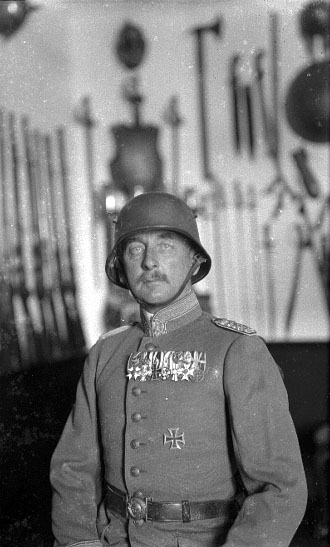
Count Hamilton in field uniform for his own regiment.

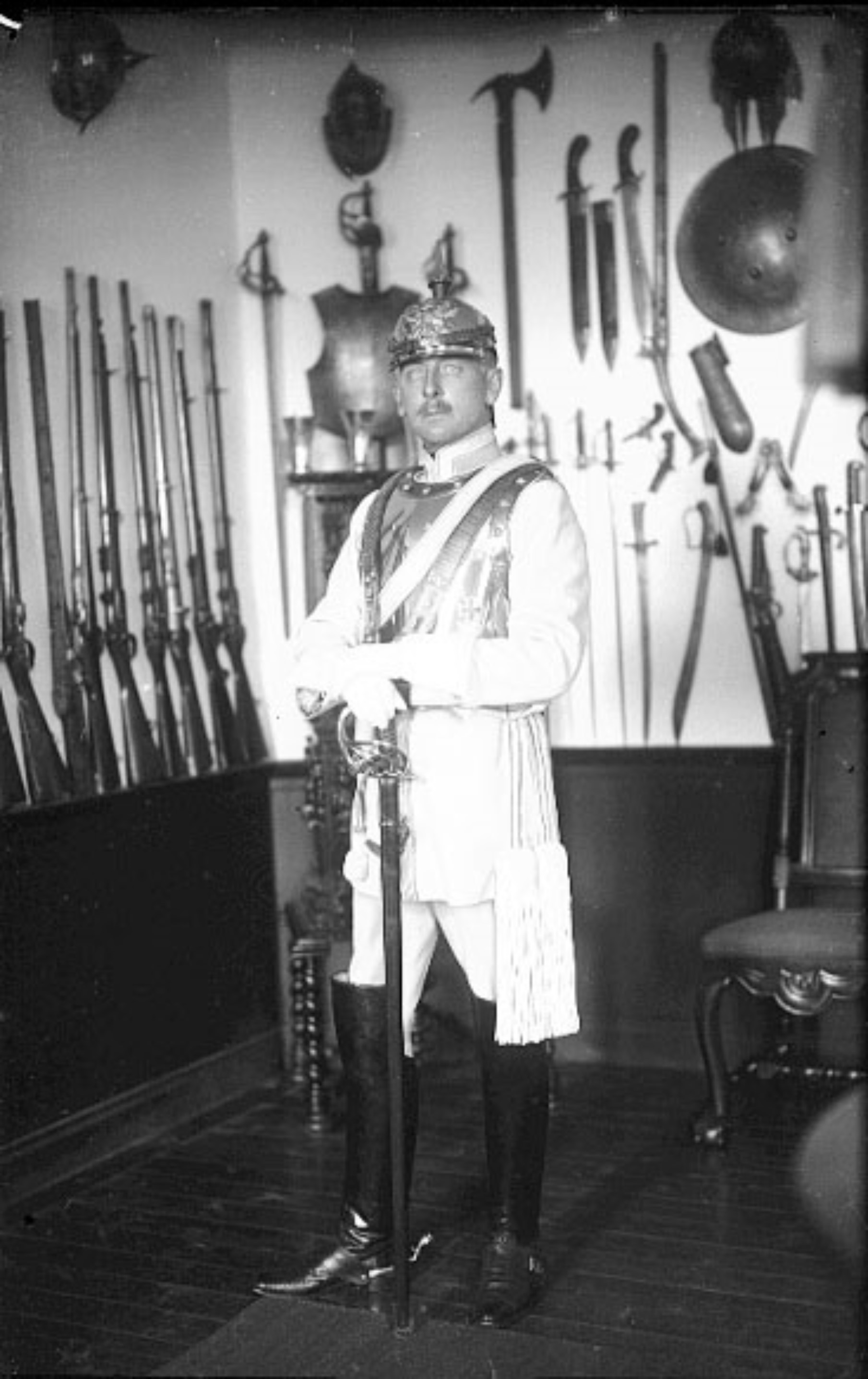
Count Hamilton in a Prussian parade dress uniform.

Uniform M/1915 for the 3rd Cuirassier regiment "Graf Wrangel"

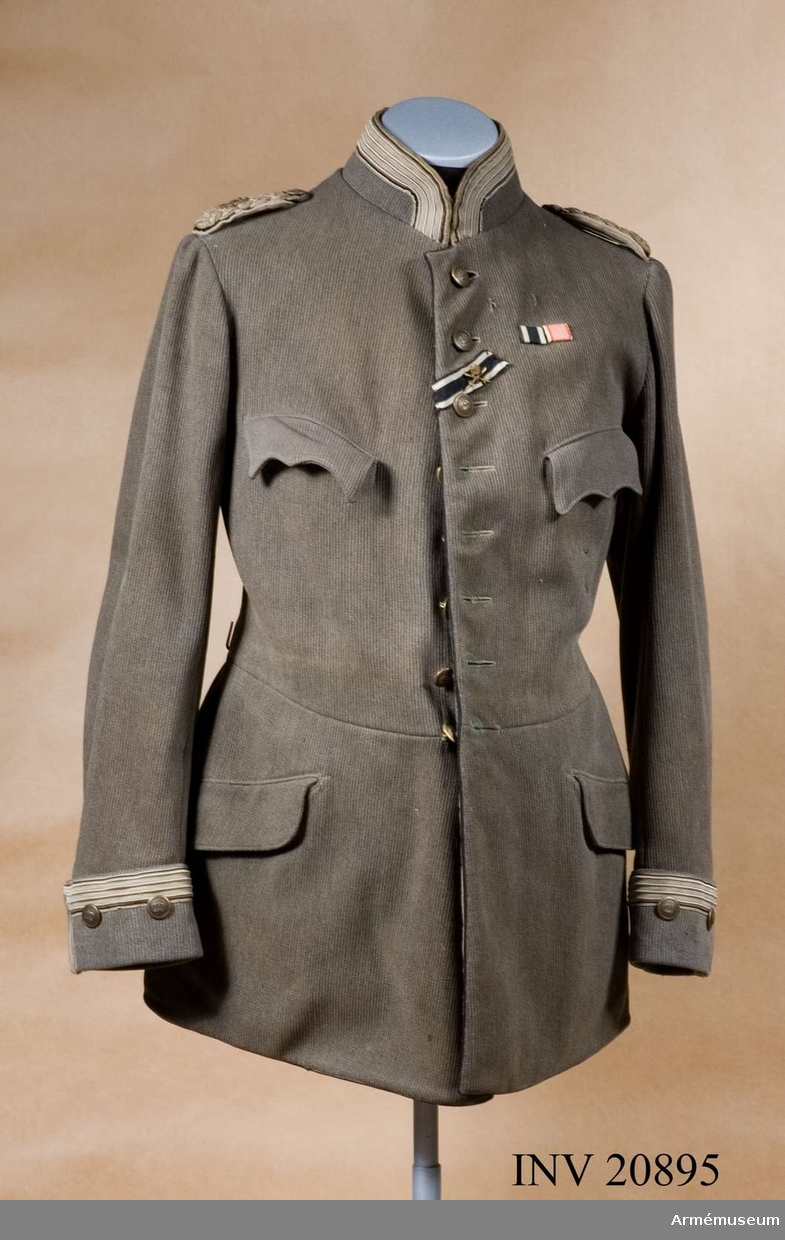
Uniform M/1910 for the 1st Cuirassier regiment "Grosser Kurfürst"

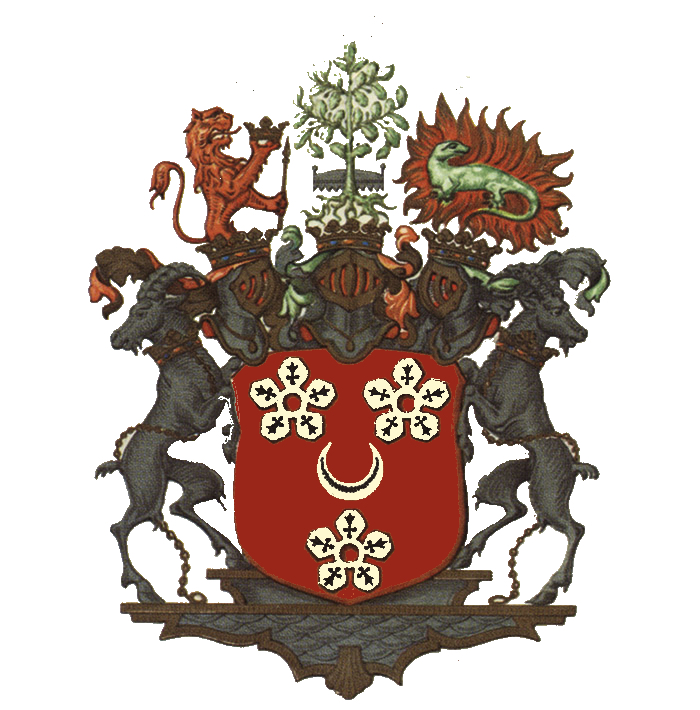
Coat of arms of the House Hamilton.

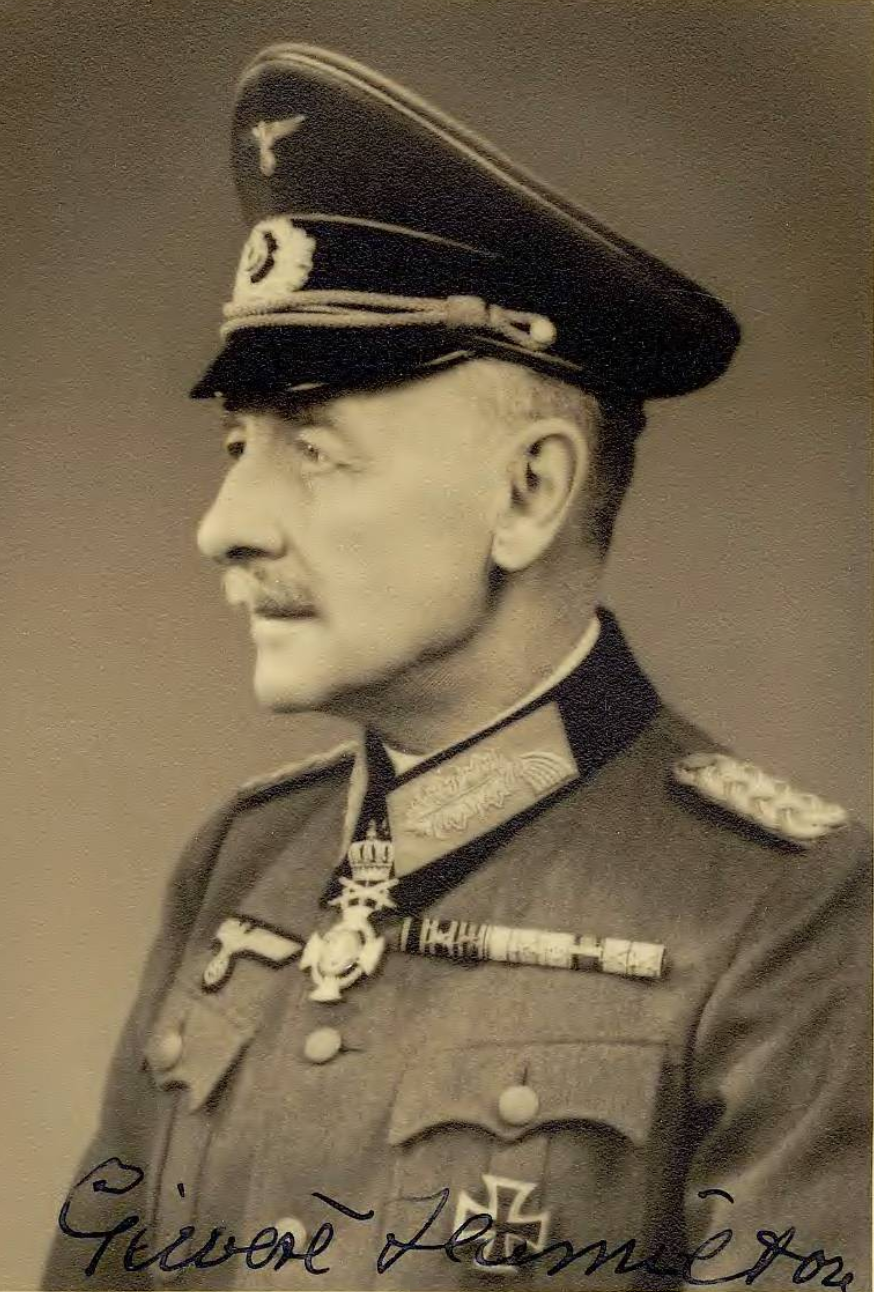
Count Gilbert Hamilton in uniform as an Honorary Generalmajor in the Replacement Army (German: Ehrengeneralmajor der Ersatzheer).

== Honours and awards ==
=== National ===
- (Sweden) Commander 1st Class of the Order of the Sword, 16 June 1928.
- (Sweden) Graduate of the Military Academy Karlberg, 1891.
- (Sweden) Graduate of the Royal Swedish Academy of War Sciences, – (Honorary), 1931.

=== Foreign ===
- (Kingdom of Prussia) Commander of the Prussian House Order of Hohenzollern, with swords, latest 1921.
- (Kingdom of Prussia) Recipient of the Prussian Iron Cross 1st Class 1916.
- (Kingdom of Prussia) Recipient of the Prussian Iron Cross 2nd Class 1915.
- (Finland) Knight of the Finnish Order of the Cross of Liberty 2nd Class, with swords, latest 1921.
- (Finland) Recipient of the Medal of the Liberation War, 1918.
- (Austria-Hungary) Recipient of the Austrian Military Merit Cross, with war decoration, latest 1925.
- (France) Knight of the French Legion of Honour, latest 1921.
- (Netherlands) Knight of the Dutch Order of Orange-Nassau, latest 1921.
- (Qing dynasty) Knight Third Class, Third Grade of the Qing Order of the Double Dragon, latest 1921.
- (Russian Empire) Knight of the Russian Order of St. Anna 3rd Class, latest 1921.

=== Military ranks ===
Gilbert Hamilton's Swedish promotions
Date	Rank	Insignia
13 November 1891	Second lieutenant Underlöjtnant	(Sweden)
10 October 1897	Lieutenant; Löjtnant	(Sweden)
1 May 1908	Rittmeister; Ryttmästare	(Sweden)
26 November 1920	Lieutenant colonel Överstelöjtnant	(Sweden)
21 October 1921	Colonel; Överste	(Sweden)

Gilbert Hamilton's German promotions
Date	Rank	Insignia
27 January 1915	Major; Major	(German Empire) (Kingdom of Prussia)
28 June 1916	Lieutenant colonel Oberstleutnant	(German Empire) (Kingdom of Prussia)
25 August 1939	Generalmajor in the reserve (Honorary); Generalmajor zur Ersatzheer	(Nazi Germany)

== Count Gilbert in popular culture ==
- The popular brand of Swedish pipe tobacco, manufactured since 1924 in Denmark by Swedish Match called "Greve Gilbert Hamiltons Blandning" is named after him.
