= Wilhelm Eugen Ludwig Ferdinand von Rohr =

Prussian general and minister of war

Prussian Minister of War
- In office 6 October 1847 – 2 April 1848
- Monarch: Frederick William IV
- Prime Minister: Ludwig Gustav von Thile; Adolf Heinrich von Arnim-Boitzenburg; Gottfried Ludolf Camphausen
- Preceded by: Hermann von Boyen
- Succeeded by: Karl von Reyher

Personal details
- Born: 17 May 1783 Brandenburg an der Havel, Kingdom of Prussia
- Died: 15 March 1851 (aged 67) Glogau, Kingdom of Prussia
- Awards: Order of the Red Eagle (Knight 1st Class)

Military service
- Allegiance: Prussia
- Branch/service: Prussian Army
- Rank: General of the Infantry
- Battles/wars: Napoleonic Wars; War of the Fourth Coalition; War of the Sixth Coalition

Wilhelm Eugen Ludwig Ferdinand von Rohr (born 17 May 1783, Brandenburg an der Havel - died 15 March 1851, Glogau) was a Prussian general and minister of war in Arnim-Boitzenburg cabinet.

On 4 October 1842 he married Auguste Gräfin von Rittberg (1824–1906).

== Literature ==
- Zur Erinnerung an Ferdinand von Rohr, Königlich Preußischen General der Infanterie und Kriegsminister außer Dienst. Beiheft zum Militair-Wochenblatt. (in German), Berlin: E.S. Mittler, October 1851, pp. 1–18
- Gustav Droysen (1853), Das Leben Yorks (in German), Berlin
- Allgemeine Militair-Encyclopädie. Band 8, p. 23.
- Kurt von Priesdorff: Soldatisches Führertum. Band 5, Hanseatische Verlagsanstalt Hamburg, ohne Jahr, S. 99–102.
