= Podągi =

Podągi Podangen
- Village
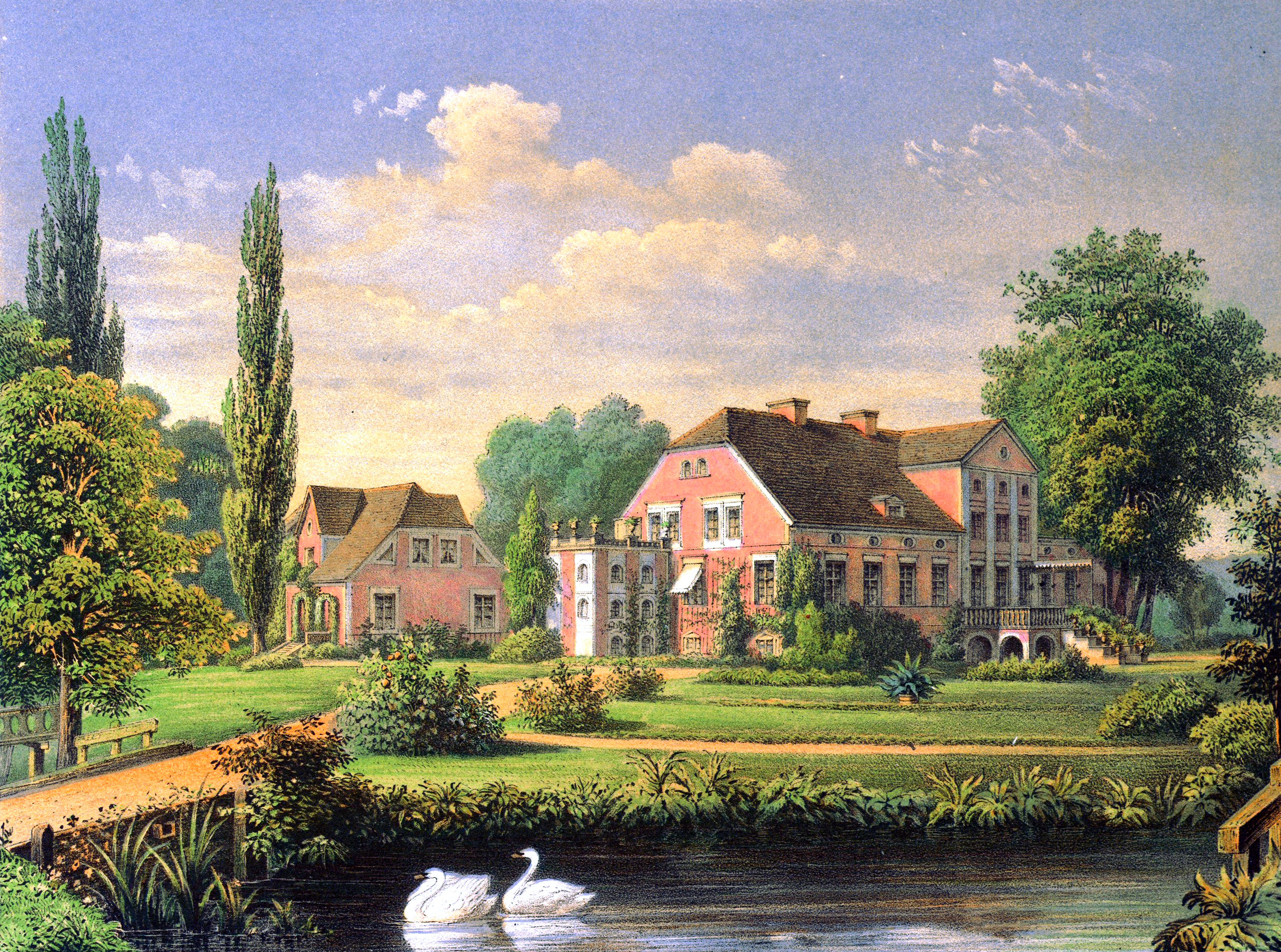
- Podangen Palace, around 1860, Edition by Alexander Duncker

- Location within Poland
- Coordinates: 54°04′54″N 20°02′10″E
- Country: Poland
- Voivodeship: Warmian-Masurian
- County: Elbląg
- Gmina: Godkowo

Podągi [pɔˈdɔnɡi] is a village in the administrative district of Gmina Godkowo, within Elbląg County, Warmian-Masurian Voivodeship, in northern Poland.

== Notable residents ==
- August von Kanitz (1783-1852), Prussian General
- Hans von Kanitz (1841–1913), Politician
- Gerhard von Kanitz (1885–1949), Politician
