= Paul Bronsart von Schellendorff =

Prussian general and writer

Paul Bronsart von Schellendorf
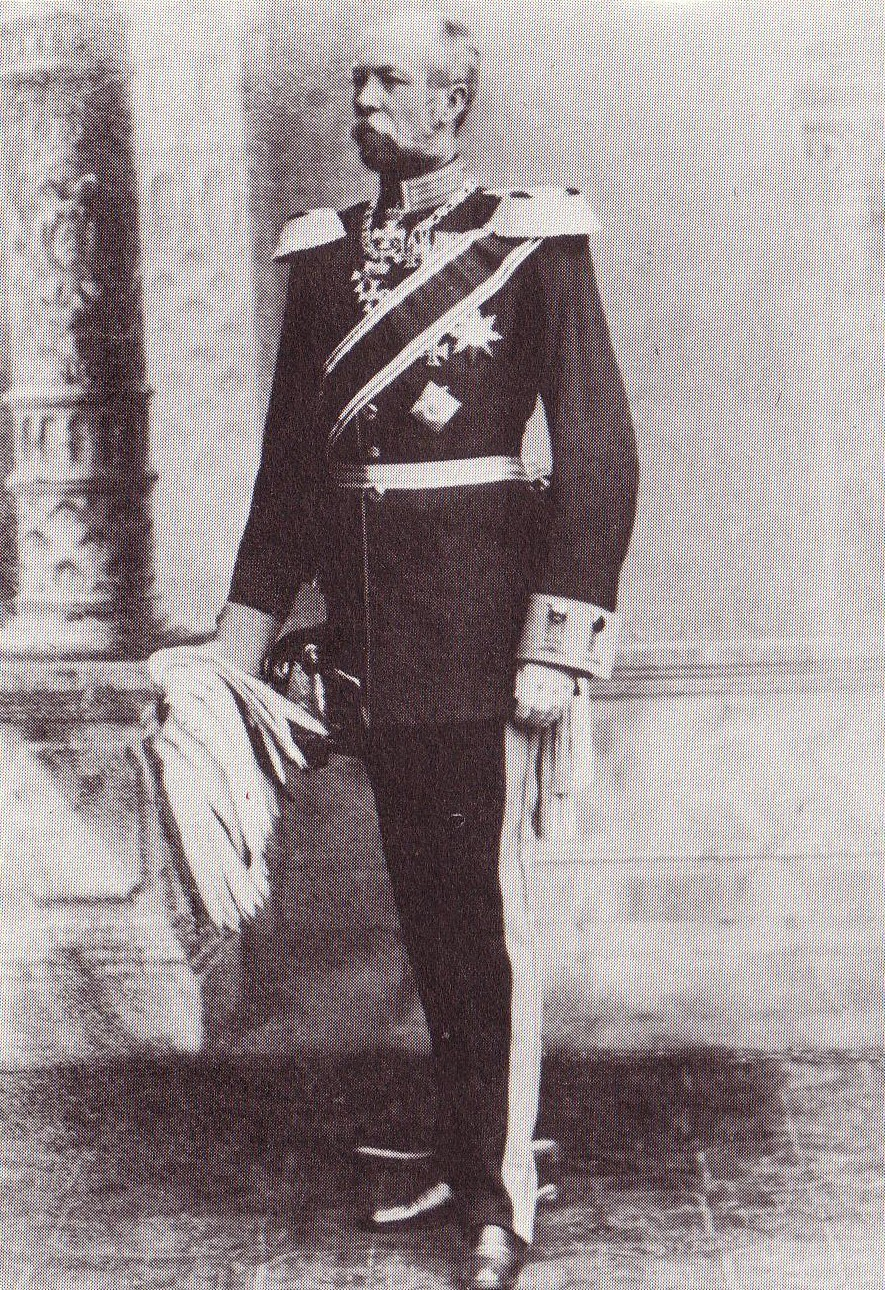
- Paul Bronsart von Schellendorf
- Born: 25 January 1832; Danzig, Prussia
- Died: 23 June 1891 (aged 59); Schettnienen manor, East Prussia, German Empire
- Military career
- Allegiance: (Kingdom of Prussia) Prussia (German Empire) Imperial Germany
- Branch: Prussian Army
- Service years: 1849–
- Rank: General of the Infantry
- Commands: I Corps
- Conflicts: Franco-Prussian War
- Other work: Prussian Minister of War (1883–1889)

Paul Leopold Eduard Heinrich Anton Bronsart von Schellendorf (25 January 1832 – 23 June 1891) was a Prussian general and writer, who served as Minister of War from 1883 to 1889.

== Family ==
Bronsart was born in Danzig (present-day Gdańsk, Poland), then administrative capital of West Prussia, the son of later General Lieutenant Heinrich Bronsart von Schellendorff (1803–1874) and his wife Antoinette Martha Elisabeth, née Drège (1810–1873). His younger brother Walther Bronsart von Schellendorff (1833–1914) also served as Prussian Minister of War from 1893 to 1896.

On 30 May 1853, Paul Bronsart married Rosalie Klara Marie, née Schmidt (1833–1913). The couple had four children, among them Fritz Bronsart von Schellendorf (1864–1950), General lieutenant and chief of the Ottoman Army general staff in World War I.

== Life and career ==
Having attended the Gymnasium in Danzig, Bronsart entered the Prussian Cadet Corps (Kadettenanstalt) in Kulm and Berlin. On 28 April 1849 he joined the Berlin Kaiser Franz Garde-Grenadier Regiment No.2 in the rank of lieutenant. From 1 June 1852 he served as adjutant in the 4th Guards Landwehr Regiment and attended the Prussian Military Academy from 1855 to 1858. On 1 May 1859 he was appointed to the German General Staff and achieved the rank of Oberleutnant. Elevated to Hauptmann (Captain) on 23 February 1861; after three years of staff service he returned to regimental duty as a company commander in the II Army Corps, but was soon reappointed to the staff, and lectured at the Military Academy, becoming major in 1865 and lieutenant colonel in 1869.

Bronsart participated in the Austro-Prussian War of 1866 as a member of the II Corps general staff, and fought in the Battle of Gitschin and Königgrätz. During the Franco-Prussian War of 1870/71 he was chief of a section on the Great General Staff headquarters, and conducted the preliminary negotiations for the surrender of the French at the Sedan fortress. After the war Bronsart was made Oberst (colonel) and Chief of Staff of the Guard Corps, becoming major general in 1876, commander of the 1st Guards Infantry Brigade in 1878, and lieutenant general (with a 2nd Guards Infantry Division command) in 1881.

In March 1883 he was appointed Prussian War Minister, succeeding Georg von Kameke. During his tenure of the post, until 1889, the peacetime establishment of the German Army was significantly increased and many important reforms were carried out in the Prussian Army, in particular the arming of the infantry with repeating rifles as well as new regulations of pension funds and compulsory military service. On 23 April 1888 he was promoted to General of the Infantry.

Minister Bronsart resigned on 8 April 1889 and was succeeded by Julius von Verdy du Vernois. At his request, he was appointed commanding general of I Army Corps at Königsberg.

Two years later he died from pneumonia at his estate of Schettnienen near Heiligenbeil (present-day Mamonovo, Kaliningrad Oblast) at the age of 59.

== Conflict with Bismarck ==
Jonathan Steinberg's Bismarck: A Life records the following:

On 18 December Bronsart put his career on the line to frustrate Bismarck's intervention in military matters. As he recorded in his war diary, he had been ordered by Eugen Anton Theophil von Podbielski to provide Bismarck with minutes of a Military Council and decided to obey orders, a court-martial offence. The whole entry records the agony of conscience of one of the most gifted of the 'demi-gods', a lieutenant colonel, a Division Chief in the General Staff, 'for me the hardest day of the entire campaign'. He had received an order from the King approved by the Chief of the General Staff, General Count Moltke, and handed to him by Lieutenant General Podbielski, Quartermaster General of the entire army. As he records the moment of his decision

if a man with the ambitious thirst for power like Count Bismarck were once to be admitted, there would be nothing more to be done...I thought about it for ten minutes; the habit of obedience got me through the address and then it failed me, and the feeling of duty, and the need to be disobedient even to the King, won the upper hand even at the sacrifice of my own person.

He reported to Podbielski that he could not carry out the order in good conscience and submitted his resignation letter at the same time. Podbielski at first flew into a rage and questioned Bronsart's sanity. Then in the face of this act of moral courage by a senior staff officer, he consulted Moltke, who revoked the order and told the King of his decision. Bismarck never got access to the Military Council minutes. Bronsart joins von Werther as two examples of unusual civil courage in the face of Bismarck's increasing dictatorial attitude. As Bronsart concludes the entry:

Had I done the demanded letters, even if I had weakened it as much as possible and rendered it colourless, it would have been approved and sent. Then Count Bismarck would sit in the saddle. He knows very well how to ride, as he once said about Germany. Where this ride would have taken us is not in doubt.

== Writings ==
Bronsart's military writings include three works of great importance:

- Ein Rückblick auf die taktischen Rückblicke (2nd ed., Berlin, 1870), a pamphlet written in reply to Captain May's Tactical Retrospect of 1866; and
- Der Dienst des Generalstabes (1st ed., Berlin, 1876; 3rd ed. revised by General Meckel, 1893; new ed. by the author's son, Major Bronsart von Schellendorf, Berlin, 1904), a comprehensive treatise on the duties of the general staff. The third edition of this work was soon after its publication translated into English and issued officially to the British army as The Duties of the General Staff. Major Bronsart's new edition of 1904 was re-issued in English by the General Staff, under the same title, in 1905.
- Schellendorf, Paul Leopold Eduard Heinrich Anton Bronsart. (1893). Duties of the General Staff, translated by William Aldworth Home Hare. London: Her Majesty's Stationery Office.

== Orders and decorations ==
He received the following awards:

- Prussia:
  - Knight of the Royal Crown Order, 3rd Class with Swords, 1866; 2nd Class with Star and Swords on Ring, 5 December 1878
  - Service Award Cross
  - Iron Cross (1870), 2nd Class, 2 September 1870; 1st Class, 31 December 1870
  - Knight's Cross of the Royal House Order of Hohenzollern, with Swords, 1871; Commander's Cross with Swords, 19 January 1873; Grand Commander's Cross with Star, 8 April 1889
  - Knight of the Red Eagle, 1st Class with Oak Leaves, 22 March 1884; Grand Cross, 3 July 1888
- Anhalt: Grand Cross of the Order of Albert the Bear
- Baden: Grand Cross of the Zähringer Lion, 20 September 1885
- Bavaria: Grand Cross of the Military Merit Order
- Brunswick: Grand Cross of the Order of Henry the Lion, with Swords
- Grand Duchy of Hesse: Commander of the Merit Order of Philip the Magnanimous, 2nd Class, 15 March 1868
- Mecklenburg:
  - Grand Cross of the Wendish Crown, with Golden Crown
  - Military Merit Cross, 2nd Class (Schwerin)
- Saxony:
  - Commander of the Order of Merit, 2nd Class with War Decoration, 1870
  - Grand Cross of the Albert Order, with Golden Star, 1886
- Württemberg:
  - Commander of the Military Merit Order, 30 December 1870
  - Grand Cross of the Friedrich Order, 1876
  - Grand Cross of the Württemberg Crown, 1885
- (Austrian Empire) (Kingdom of Hungary) Austria-Hungary:
  - Grand Cross of the Order of Franz Joseph, 1877
  - Grand Cross of the Imperial Order of Leopold, 1889
- China: Order Star, 1st Class
- Greece: Grand Cross of the Redeemer
- Italy: Grand Cross of the Crown of Italy, 17 March 1883
- Japan: Grand Cordon of the Rising Sun
- Luxembourg: Grand Cross of the Oak Crown
- Ottoman Empire: Order of the Medjidie, 1st Class
- Russia:
  - Knight of St. Anna, 2nd Class with Swords and in Diamonds
  - Knight of St. Vladimir, 3rd Class
- Serbia: Grand Cross of the Cross of Takovo
- Sweden-Norway:
  - Commander of the Sword, 1st Class, 2 June 1875
  - Grand Cross of St. Olav, 24 September 1888

Political offices
Preceded by Georg von Kameke	Prussian Minister of War; 1883–1889	Succeeded by Julius von Verdy du Vernois
