= Kanitz v Rogers Cable Inc =

Kanitz v Rogers Cable Inc, 2002 CanLII 49415 (ON SC), 58 OR (3d) 299 is a leading Canadian decision on website service contracts. The court held that a posting on a corporate website is sufficient notice to bind customers to changes in their user licenses.

A number of Rogers Cable customers started a class action to challenge Rogers amending of the arbitration provision in their user agreement. They claimed that customers were not given sufficient notice of the amendments to make it valid. Rogers should have emailed all its customers to properly notify them.

The Court held that the notice given was sufficient and that an email was not necessary. Customers, the judge held, were obliged to check the website from time to time for amendments to their user agreements.

The Court also upheld the arbitration agreement itself, as well as a "no class actions" clause. In other words, the parts of the contract that forbade Rogers customers from going to a regular court (forcing them instead to seek redress from an arbitration panel) and from suing as a class were deemed valid. The Ontario legislature quickly responded by including provisions in the 2002 Consumer Protection Act that make both "no class action" clauses and "arbitration clauses" unenforceable in consumer contracts.
