= Hans von Kaltenborn-Stachau =

Prussian general (1836-1898)

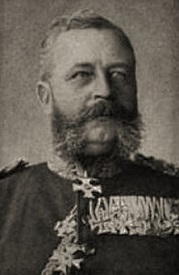
Hans von Kaltenborn-Stachau

Hans Karl Georg von Kaltenborn-Stachau (23 March 1836 in Magdeburg – 16 February 1898 in Braunschweig) was a Prussian General of the Infantry and Minister of War.

== Biography ==
He belonged to the aristocratic Kaltenborn-Stachau family, and was raised in the cadet corps, before joining the 27th Infantry Regiment as a second lieutenant in 1854. From 1857 to 1860 he attended the Allgemeine Kriegsschule (the "General War College", which later became the Prussian Military Academy) and in 1861 was assigned for 3 years to the Topographical Department of the Great General Staff.

Kaltenborn-Stachau participated in the Second Schleswig War in 1864 and in December was transferred to the general staff of the VI Army Corps. In this position he served in the Austro-Prussian War in 1866, after being promoted to captain in 1865. In 1868 he became a company commander in the 94th Regiment, and in 1869 a general staff officer in the VII Army Corps.

After being promoted to major, he then served in the Franco-Prussian War in 1870–71. In 1874 he became commander of a battalion in the Grenadierregiment Nr. 2, and was made a colonel in 1878. After commanding the 53rd Infantry Regiment, he took over the Kaiser-Alexander-Gardegrenadierregiment, and in 1884 became Chief of Staff of the Guards Corps, and a major general. In November 1885 he became commander of the 2nd Guards Infantry Brigade and in January 1888 was given command of the 3rd Division. In July of that year he was made commander of the 2nd Guards Infantry Division and was simultaneously promoted to lieutenant general.

His appointment as Prussian Minister of War occurred on 4 October 1890. In 1893, under his leadership a plan was enacted whereby the army was expanded by 70,000 men, and the length of service was increased to two years. Kaltenborn-Stachau resigned from his office on 12 October 1893.

== Honours and awards ==
- Kingdom of Prussia:
  - Knight of the Crown Order, 4th Class with Swords, 1866; 2nd Class with Swords on Ring, 18 January 1883; 1st Class, 18 January 1891
  - Service Award Cross
  - Iron Cross (1870), 1st Class with 2nd Class on Black Band
  - Knight of the Red Eagle, 2nd Class with Oak Leaves, 8 September 1885; 1st Class, 19 September 1891; with Crown, 12 June 1892; Grand Cross, 17 October 1893
- Austrian Empire:
  - Knight of the Order of Franz Joseph, 1864
  - Knight of the Iron Crown, 1st Class, 1889
- Kingdom of Bavaria: Grand Cross of the Military Merit Order
- Denmark: Grand Cross of the Dannebrog, 13 January 1890
- Kingdom of Italy:
  - Grand Cross of Saints Maurice and Lazarus
  - Grand Cross of the Crown of Italy
- Lippe-Detmold: Cross of Honour of the House Order of Lippe, 1st Class with Swords on Ring
- Mecklenburg: Grand Cross of the Wendish Crown, with Golden Crown
- Netherlands: Grand Cross of the Netherlands Lion
- Kingdom of Romania: Grand Cross of the Crown of Romania
- Russian Empire: Knight of St. Anna, 1st Class
- Kingdom of Saxony: Grand Cross of the Albert Order
- Schaumburg-Lippe:
  - Cross of Honour of the House Order of Schaumburg-Lippe, 1st Class with Swords on Ring
  - Military Merit Medal
- Spain: Grand Cross of Military Merit
- Sweden-Norway: Commander Grand Cross of the Sword, 31 August 1888
- Württemberg:
  - Grand Cross of the Friedrich Order, 1891
  - Grand Cross of the Württemberg Crown, 1893

Political offices
Preceded by Julius von Verdy du Vernois	Prussian Minister of War; 1890–1893	Succeeded by Walther Bronsart von Schellendorff
