= Karl von Strotha =

Prussian officer and Minister of War

Karl Adolf von Strotha (22 February 1786 in Frankenstein – 15 February 1870 in Berlin) was a Prussian officer and Minister of War from 1848 to 1850.

== Biography ==
Strotha was born into an officers' family and joined the Prussian infantry in 1805 and participated in the Battle of Jena-Auerstedt. He was dismissed from active service due to the cutbacks in the army after the Prussian defeat, although he was made an ensign in 1809. In 1811, Strotha was re-activated as Lieutenant in the artillery. During the War of the Sixth Coalition he was in the Guard Battery. He participated in the battles of Lützen, Bautzen, Haynau, Kulm, Dohna and Leipzig.

In 1815 Strotha was made a First Lieutenant. A year later he was made a Captain and commander of a battery of artillery on horseback. He also traveled to several European countries. From 1827 to 1830 he commanded the artillery in Magdeburg. After that, he was a Major in a Guard artillery brigade. In 1842, Strotha was made a colonel and, in 1847 commander of the 3rd artillery brigade. In March 1848 he was made commander of the fortress of Saarlouis, and in May of the same year, was made a Major General.

In November 1848, Strotha became Minister of War in the Brandenburg government. He played a significant role in the military organisation of the counter-revolution, and had General Friedrich Graf von Wrangel march into Berlin. He later organised the fight against the revolutionaries in Dresden and in Baden, and the suppression of the Palatinate revolt.

In 1850, he submitted his resignation, due to differences of opinion between him and King Frederick William IV. His resignation was also caused by power disputes between the King and his minister. The King had made appointments without the minister's counter-signature, that was usual in other ministries.

After his resignation as minister, Strotha was made a Lieutenant General in 1850, as well as commander of the 2nd Artillery inspection, and chairman of the artillery examination board, before retiring in 1854.

Strotha was a member of the first chamber of the Prussian parliament in 1849 and 1850, and was a member of the parliament of the Erfurt Union in 1850.
Strotha was the author of several works on military history.

Political offices
Preceded by Ernst von Pfuel	Prussian Minister of War; 1848–1850	Succeeded by August von Stockhausen
