= Sossenheim =

- Quarter of Frankfurt am Main
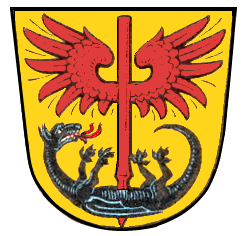
- Coat of arms

- Location of Sossenheim (red) and the Ortsbezirk West (light red) within Frankfurt am Main
- Interactive map of Sossenheim
- Location within Germany Location within Hesse
- Coordinates: 50°07′08″N 08°33′57″E
- Country: Germany
- State: Hesse
- Admin. region: Darmstadt
- District: Urban district
- City: Frankfurt am Main

Area
  - Total: 5.969 km^{2} (2.305 sq mi)

Population (2020-12-31)
  - Total: 16,175
  - Density: 2,710/km^{2} (7,018/sq mi)
- Time zone: UTC+01:00 (CET)
  - Summer (DST): UTC+02:00 (CEST)
- Postal codes: 65936
- Dialling codes: 069
- Vehicle registration: F
- Website: www.sossenheim.de

Sossenheim (German pronunciation: [ˈzɔsn̩haɪm]) is a quarter of Frankfurt am Main, Germany. It is part of the Ortsbezirk West and is subdivided into the Stadtbezirke Sossenheim-Ost and Sossenheim-West.

Sossenheim has been a district of Frankfurt since 1928 and makes part of the northwest border of the city. It borders Unterliederbach, Eschborn in the north, Rödelheim in the east and Griesheim and Nied in the south.

Painter Wilhelm Runze is buried in the Sossenheim Cemetery.
