= Ludwig Freiherr Roth von Schreckenstein =

Prussian General of the cavalry and Minister of War

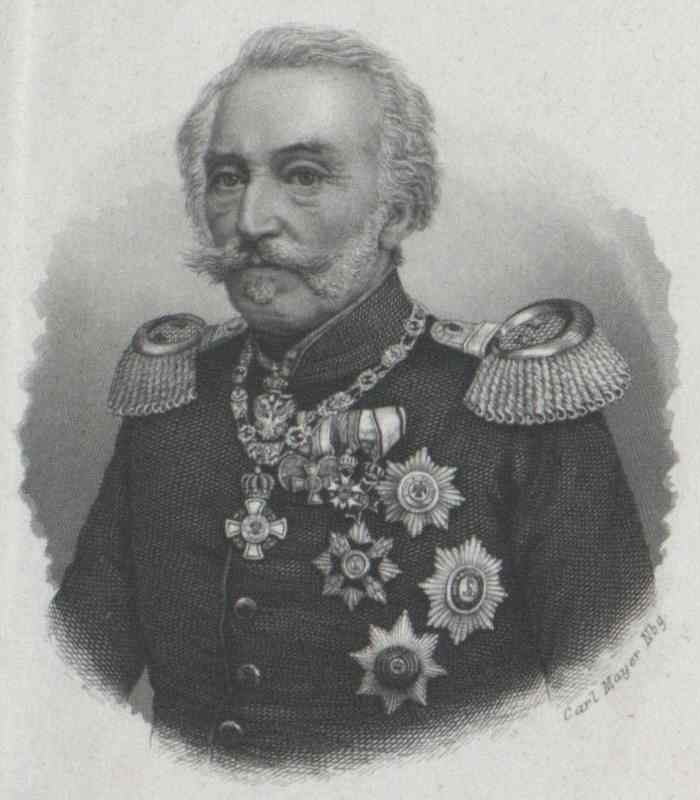
General Baron Ludwig Roth von Schreckenstein

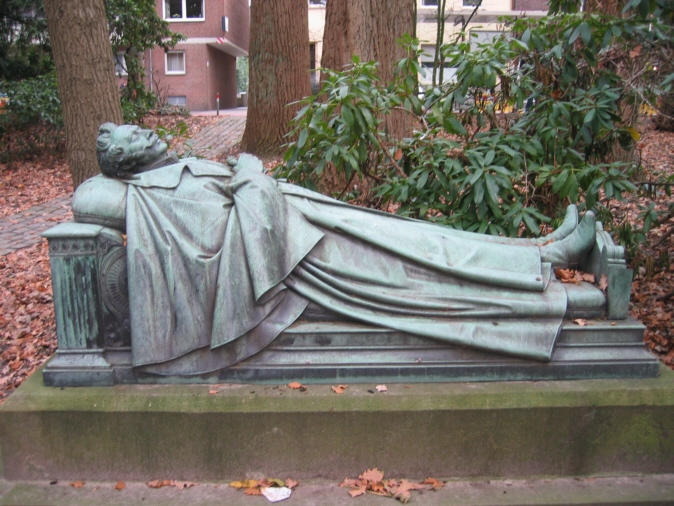
Schreckenstein's grave in Munster

Ludwig Johann Karl Gregor Eusebius Freiherr Roth von Schreckenstein (16 November 1789 in Immendingen – 30 May 1858 in Münster) was a Prussian General of the cavalry and Minister of War.

== Biography ==
He was the son of Friedrich Freiherr Roth von Schreckenstein (1753–1808) and of Kunigunde von Riedheim (1767–1828) and belonged to old Swabian Reichrsritter family Roth von Schreckenstein, which had its ancestral seat in Immendingen.

Already in 1806, Schreckenstein became a squire at the court of Frederick Augustus I of Saxony. On 16 April 1809 he received his commission, and joined the Saxonian cuirassier regiment of Zastrow as a lieutenant and in 1812 participated in Napoleon's campaign in Russia with the Grande Armée. There he was on the staff of General Johann von Thielmann, and earned great credit in September 1812 at the victory of the Battle of Borodino.

On 15 May 1815, Schreckenstein joined the Prussian service as a Rittmeister and adjutant to Thielmann. He fought with the III Prussian Army Corps in 1815 at the battles of Ligny and Wavre during the Belgian campaign. Promoted to major in 1816, in 1824 he was appointed staff officer of the 8. Husarenregiment in Düsseldorf.

Also in times of peace, he could always be sure of the favour of his superiors and preferment in promotions. There followed his appointment to lieutenant colonel in 1830 and to colonel in 1834. In 1837 he received the command over the 13. Kavalleriebrigade in Münster.

In 1841 Schreckenstein was promoted to major general. During the Revolutions of 1848 he was a division commander in Cologne. To put an end to the revolutionary fighting in Trier, he declared martial law over the city and disbanded its militia. On 10 May 1848 he was appointed a lieutenant general and a month later, on 25 June, was appointed the successor of August von Kanitz as Prussian Minister of War. After a clash between citizens and the military on 31 July 1848 in Schweidnitz, Schreckenstein submitted his resignation in September, under pressure from the Frankfurt Parliament. The entire war ministry went with him.

On 19 April 1849, Schreckenstein once again joined the military, and took over as commander of the Guard Corps during the First Schleswig War. In September of that year, he was placed in command of the Prussian troops in Baden, Hohenzollern and Frankfurt. On 2 June 1853, Schreckenstein was appointed General of the Cavalry and general officer commanding of the VII. Armeekorps. In 1857, he was one of the first to receive the House Order of Hohenzollern.

He died at the castle of Münster.

== Family ==
Schreckenstein married the Countess Luise von Hatzfeldt (21 November 1800 – 22 January 1835 in Aschersleben), on 4 October 1828, in Düsseldorf. His wife was the daughter of Prince (after 1803) Franz Ludwig von Hatzfeldt zu Trachenberg (1756–1827), royal Prussian ambassador in Vienna, and Friederike Karoline Countess of Schulenburg-Kehnert (1779–1832). They had two children:

- Konrad Franz Hugo Engelbert Eusebius (18 November 1829 – 28 May 1905), who married Cäcilie von Arnim (1841–1927)
- Maximilian Edmund Eusebius (22 August 1831 – 12 August 1875)

== Works ==
In the 1850s, Roth von Schreckenstein wrote various works on military theory:

- Gedanken über die Organisation und den Gebrauch der Cavallerie im Felde. Berlin 1849.
- Die Cavallerie in der Schlacht an der Moskwa. Münster 1855.
- Vorlesung über den Sicherheitsdienst im Felde nebst Betrachtung über Taktik und Strategie. Münster 1858.

Political offices
Preceded by August Wilhelm Graf von Kanitz	Prussian Minister of War; 1848	Succeeded by Ernst von Pfuel
