= August von Stockhausen =

Prussian officer and minister of war

August Wilhelm Ernst von Stockhausen (19 February 1791, in Thüringen – 31 March 1861, in Berlin) was a Prussian officer and minister of war 1850-51.

Stockhausen came from Thüringen. In 1805 he joined the Feldjägerregiment of the Prussian Army as an officer cadet. In 1808 he became a second lieutenant and changed over to the Garde-Jäger-Bataillon. In 1813 and 1814 he participated in the War of the Sixth Coalition. In 1824 he was made a Major and in 1830 was assigned to the General Staff. From 1840 to 1842 he was the Chief of Staff of the Guard Corps, that was then commanded by Prince Wilhelm. In 1845 he was made a Major General. A short while later he was made inspector of the garrisons of the German Confederation's fortresses. In 1848 he was placed in command of the 9. Infanteriebrigade in Posen. Before he could take up this position, however, he was made Chief of Staff of the troops under General Friedrich Graf von Wrangel in the First Schleswig War. By the time Von Stockhausen joined up with the troops, the Danish units had already withdrawn to the islands.

In July 1848 he was placed in command of the 1st Division in Königsberg. He aimed to become minister of war, however, and tried to campaign for himself in Berlin. Since he met with no success, he asked to be retired. This request was granted when he was made a Lieutenant General, with appropriate pension rights.

But there were still political elements that wanted to see Von Stockhausen as minister of war. Partly for this reason, Von Stockhausen successfully stood for election to the second chamber of the Prussian parliament. He was a member of the parliament until he resigned his mandate on 9 May 1849. There, he belonged very much to the right wing, but did not join any parliamentary party.

After Karl von Strotha's resignation on 27 February 1850, he was made minister of war. For a time, he also had hopes of becoming prime minister. However, there were personal as well as political differences between Stockhausen and King Frederick William IV. Amongst the personal matters, the latter accused Stockhausen of being an "enemy of Pietism", and thus, of Christianity. Politically, Stockhausen, like his predecessor, supported the view that royal orders concerning personnel issues (such as promotions) constitutionally had to be counter-signed by the minister of war.

After the appointment of Joseph von Radowitz as Foreign Minister, Stockhausen tried to avert a looming war with Austria. He was even falsely accused of deliberately dragging his feet in the preparations for such a war. His relationship with the King remained tense and Stockhausen asked to be dismissed more than once. The King delayed doing so however, as there was no suitable replacement. When Stockhausen refused to defend in parliament higher pay for the officers of certain Guard regiments, he was dismissed on 31 December 1851. He then held the post of chairman of the general medals commission (Generalordenskommission) until 1853. He was also a member of the first chamber of the Prussian parliament in 1852-53.

Political offices
Preceded by Karl von Strotha	Prussian Minister of War; 1850–1851	Succeeded by Eduard von Bonin
