= August Wilhelm Graf von Kanitz =

Prussian Minister of War

- Born: 29 October 1783; Podangen, East Prussia (now Poland)
- Died: 22 May 1852 (aged 68); Potsdam, Germany
- Military career
- Allegiance: Prussia
- Branch: Prussian Army
- Service years: 1798-1848
- Rank: Lieutenant General; Minister of War
- Conflicts: War of the Sixth Coalition
- Awards: Pour le Mérite

Graf August Karl Wilhelm von Kanitz (29 October 1783 – 22 May 1852) was a Prussian lieutenant general and was also the minister of war from 26 April to 16 June 1848 (without party affiliation) in the Camphausen-Hansemann government.

Kanitz became an officer-cadet in 1798, and an ensign one year later. In 1801 he was made a second lieutenant. In 1806 he took part in the Battle of Jena-Auerstedt. In 1810 he was promoted to first lieutenant and to Stabskapitän in 1811. In 1812 Kanitz received the Pour le Mérite award ("the Blue Max"). In 1813-14 he took part in the War of the Sixth Coalition. In 1813 he was made a major. Two years later he was assigned to be adjutant to Frederick William III of Prussia. In 1819 he was promoted to lieutenant colonel and in 1825 to colonel. From 1832 Von Kanitz was commander of the 1. Landwehrbrigade, after 1840 commanded the 1st Division and after 1841 the 15th Division. Between 1841 and 1848 Von Kanitz was the interim commander in Cologne. In 1843 he became a lieutenant general and in 1848 was made a general officer commanding (Kommandierender General) on an interim basis.

Camphausen had originally planned to make Colonel Hans Adolf Erdmann von Auerswald his Minister of War. However, as part of an early power struggle over the right to decide on military matters, King Frederick William IV refused to appoint him and instead chose Kanitz. His predecessor as War Minister was Karl von Reyher, he was succeeded by General Ludwig Freiherr Roth von Schreckenstein.

Von Kanitz was a Freemason and belonged to the Grand Lodge "Zu den drei Weltkugeln" in Berlin.
