= Julius von Verdy du Vernois =

German general (1832–1910)

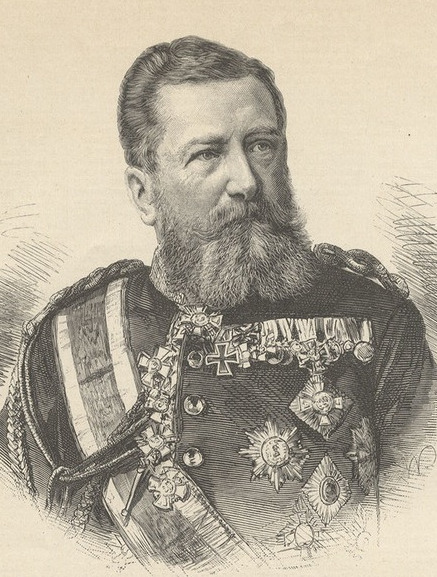
- Born: 19 July 1832; Province of Silesia, Kingdom of Prussia
- Died: 30 September 1910 (aged 78) Stockholm, Sweden
- Allegiance: Kingdom of Prussia
- Branch: Prussian Army
- Rank: General of the Infantry
- Commands: Military Governor of Strasbourg
- Conflicts: Austro-Prussian War: Battle of Königgrätz; Franco-Prussian War
- Other work: Prussian Minister of War

Adrian Friedrich Wilhelm Julius Ludwig von Verdy du Vernois (19 July 1832 – 30 September 1910), often given the short name of Verdy, was a German general and staff officer, chiefly noted both for his military writings and his service on Helmuth von Moltke the Elder's staff during the Franco-Prussian War.

== Life and career ==
Verdy was born in Freystadt, Province of Silesia, and entered the Prussian Army in 1850. After some years of regimental service he came to the attention of Graf Moltke, the newly appointed Chief of the Prussian General Staff, and at the outbreak of the Austro-Prussian War (1866) he was appointed major on the staff of the Second Army (commanded by Crown Prince Frederick). He took part in the campaign on the upper Elbe and participated in the Battle of Königgrätz, which saw the defeat of the Austrians.

Promoted shortly after this to the rank of lieutenant-colonel, in 1867 Verdy was placed at the head of the intelligence section of the general staff, becoming thereby one of Moltke's principal confidential assistants. In this capacity he served at the headquarters of the German army throughout the Franco-Prussian War (1870–71), and became known as one of Moltke's famed "demigods."

At the close of the war he continued to serve on the general staff, and also lectured at the Prussian Military Academy. It was in the latter position that he developed the system of thorough tactical education which is considered the abiding result of his work. His method may be studied in English translations of his Studies in Troop-leading, and may be summarized as the assumption of an actual military situation on the actual ground, followed by critical discussion of the successive measures that a commander, whether of a brigade, division or larger force, should take in the sequel, given his orders and his knowledge of the general situation. Moltke's own series of tactical problems, extending from 1859 to 1889, contributed very powerfully, of course, to the education of the selected young officers who passed through Verdy's hands, but Moltke dealt rather with a great number of separate problems, while Verdy developed in detail the successive events and ruling ideas of a whole day's or week's work in the same units. Moltke therefore may be said to have developed the art of forming correct ideas and plans, Verdy that of applying them, but these are after all merely tendencies, not sharply divided schemes, in the teaching of Prussian staff officers during the years of intellectual development between 1870 and 1888. In all this Moltke, Verdy and Paul Bronsart von Schellendorff worked in close co-operation.

In 1876 Verdy was promoted to Generalmajor, from 1879 to 1883 he held an important position in the ministry of war, and in 1881 he was promoted lieutenant-general. In 1887 he became governor of Strasbourg, in 1888 was promoted to General of the Infantry. From 1889 to 1890 he served as Prussian Minister of War, after which he retired from the active list. In 1894 the University of Königsberg made him a Dr. Phil, honoris causa.

Julius von Verdy du Vernois died in 1910 aged 78.

== Honours and awards ==
- Prussia:
  - Knight of the Red Eagle, 3rd Class with Bow and Swords, 1866; 2nd Class with Oak Leaves and Swords on Ring, 1877; with Star, 18 January 1883; 1st Class, 23 March 1890
  - Iron Cross (1870), 1st Class with 2nd Class on Black Band
  - Knight's Cross of the Royal House Order of Hohenzollern, with Swords, 1871; Commander's Cross, 19 January 1873
  - Knight of the Crown Order, 2nd Class with Star, 9 September 1879
  - Service Award Cross
  - Pour le Mérite (civil), 1 August 1891
  - Knight of Merit of the Prussian Crown, 1 March 1909
- (Austrian Empire) (Kingdom of Hungary) Austria-Hungary:
  - Grand Cross of the Order of Franz Joseph, 1876
  - Grand Cross of the Imperial Order of Leopold, 1889
- Baden: Grand Cross of the Zähringer Lion, 1889
- Bavaria: Commander of the Military Merit Order, 10 November 1890
- (Saxe-Coburg and Gotha) (Duchy of Saxe-Altenburg) (Saxe-Meiningen) Ernestine duchies: Commander of the Saxe-Ernestine House Order, 1st Class with Swords, 1875
- Grand Duchy of Hesse: Grand Cross of the Ludwig Order, 21 September 1889
- Italy:
  - Grand Cross of Saints Maurice and Lazarus
  - Commander of the Crown of Italy
- Mecklenburg:
  - Military Merit Cross, 2nd Class (Schwerin)
  - Grand Cross of the Wendish Crown, 20 December 1897
- Oldenburg: Commander of Honour of the Order of Duke Peter Friedrich Ludwig, with Swords, 31 December 1870
- Persia: Order of the Lion and the Sun, 1st Class
- Portugal: Grand Cross of the Military Order of St. Benedict of Aviz
- Russia:
  - Knight of the White Eagle
  - Knight of St. Anna, 2nd Class with Swords
  - Knight of St. Vladimir, 4th Class
- Saxony:
  - Commander of the Order of Merit, 2nd Class, with War Decoration, 1870
  - Grand Cross of the Albert Order, with Golden Star, 1889
- Schaumburg-Lippe: Military Merit Medal, with Swords
- Württemberg:
  - Commander of the Military Merit Order, 30 December 1870
  - Grand Cross of the Friedrich Order, 1879

== Notes ==
Political offices
Preceded by Paul Bronsart von Schellendorf	Prussian Minister of War; 1889–1890	Succeeded by Hans von Kaltenborn-Stachau
