= Hans von Kanitz =

Hans Wilhelm Alexander Graf von Kanitz-Podangen (17 April 1841 in Mednicken – 30 June 1913 in Podangen) was a German politician for German Conservative Party and Junker.

== Life ==
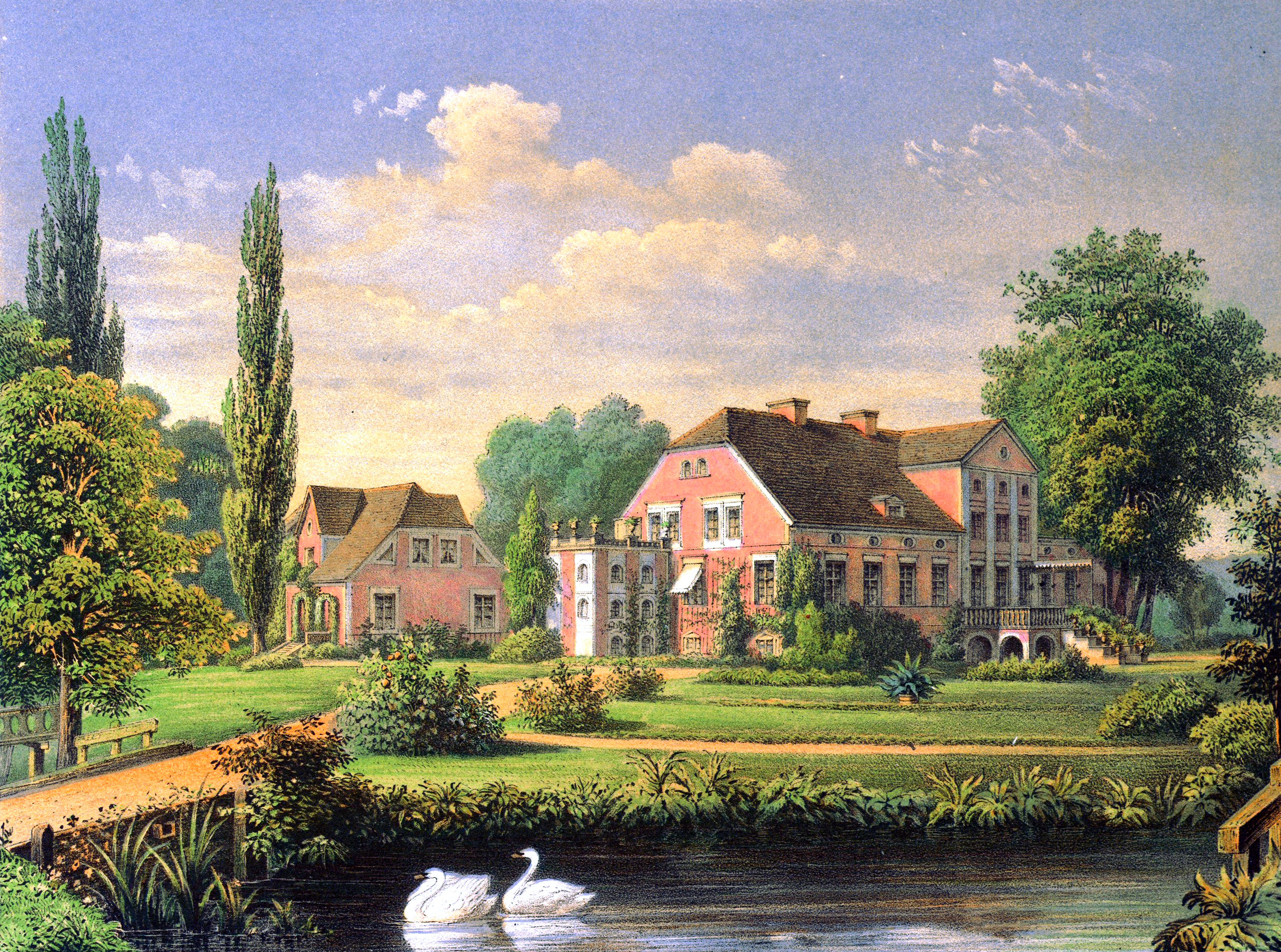
Castle Podangen, Alexander Duncker

Kanitz was born in Mednicken, in the Province of Prussia (now Drushnoye, Zelenogradsky District, Kaliningrad Oblast). In 1894 he proposed the Kanitz Plan: an import monopoly for grain, whereby all grain imports would be made on the government's account and resold on the home market at a price calculated from the average price of the last 40 years. If import prices were below this level, the profits would go into a reserve fund that would be used to subsidise imports when the price rose above the average. As grain prices at that time were lower than they had been for most of the previous 40 years, the effect of the Kanitz Plan would have been considerable price rises.

The Chancellors Leo von Caprivi and Chlodwig, Prince of Hohenlohe-Schillingsfürst both opposed the scheme, with the latter condemning it as a dangerous step to socialism. August Bebel, the Chairman of the Social Democrats, replied that a policy to make one class wealthier at the nation's expense, especially at the expense of the working class, was anything but social.

The Kanitz Plan was adopted in modified form by the Nazis and by the Federal Republic.

From 1885 to 1913 Kanitz was member of Prussian House of Representatives. Kanitz was from 1890 to 1913 member of German Reichstag for German Conservative Party.
