= Karl von Reyher =

Prussian officer

Karl Friedrich Wilhelm Reyher (from 1828 von Reyher) (21 June 1786, in Groß Schönebeck – 7 October 1857, in Berlin) was a Prussian soldier during the Napoleonic wars and later an officer who served as Minister of War in the government of Gottfried Ludolf Camphausen during the Revolution of 1848. After 1848 he also served as chief of the General Staff.

== Early life ==
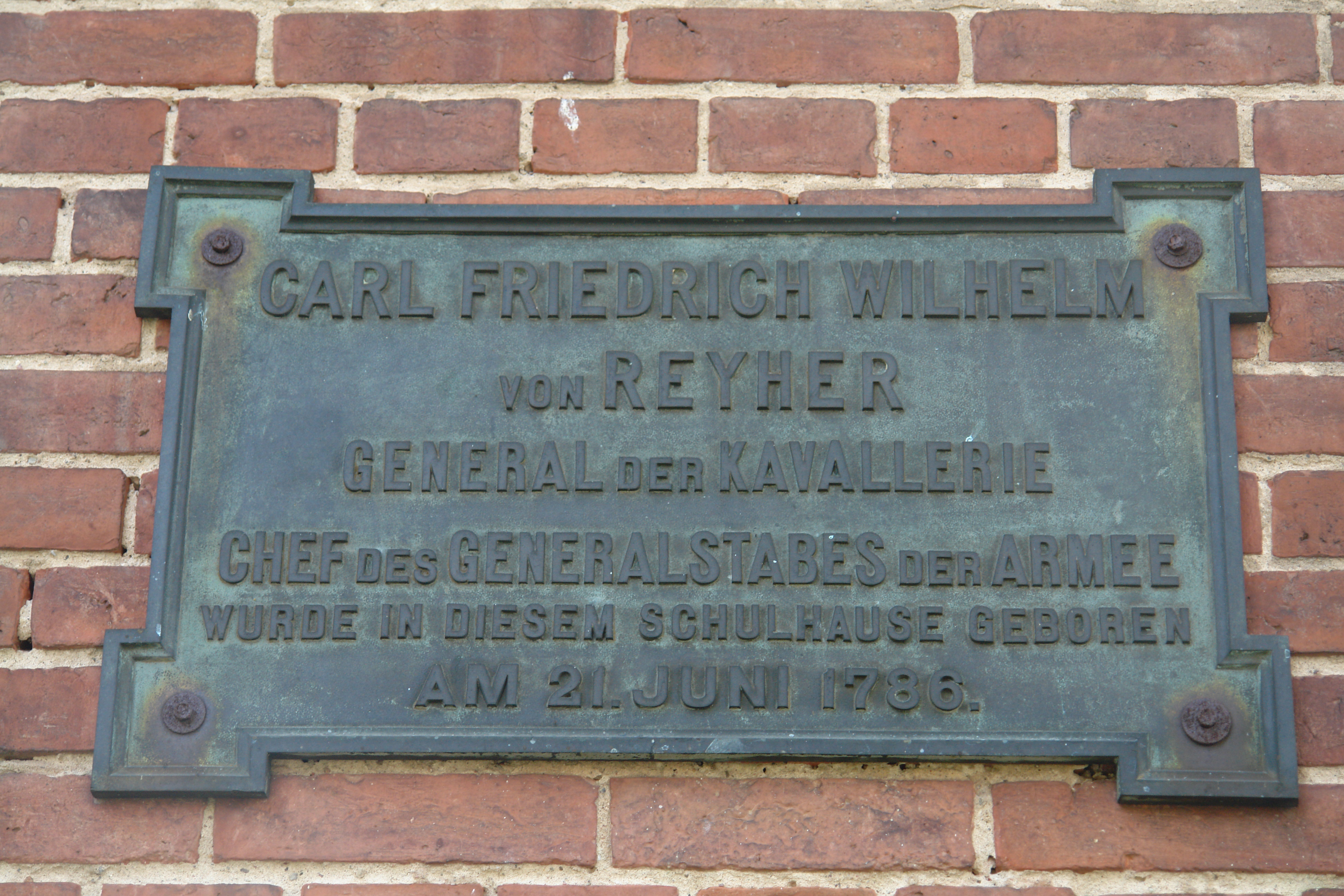
Memorial Plaque for Reyher's birth at school house, Groß Schönebeck

Reyher was the son of Johann Samuel Reyher, cantor and teacher from Groß Schönebeck (a small village about 40 miles north east of Berlin, as of 2003 part of a new municipality of Schorfheide, Brandenburg by the merger of Finowfurt and Groß Schönebeck). His mother was Johanna Karoline, née Eckart, the daughter of a local forestry officer. The area where he was born was known for its hunting, and the small village had a royal hunting lodge of the Hohenzollern Electors and Kings that is now a museum to hunting. Johann had been married prior to marrying Johanna as his second wife. Karl was the eldest son from this marriage and was born in the village schoolhouse (as of 2023, still preserved with a memorial plaque dedicated to Reyher).

His father Johann had attended Friedrichs Wilhelms Gymnasium in Berlin. Despite this, the large family had a low income. As the cantor and organist, Johann's income was not enough to send the children to any higher education. Karl was limited to studying reading, writing, and arithmetic solely at the village school.

At the age of thirteen he had to leave school and take up a profession. He first began training as an official clerk in Liebenwalde in 1799 at the age of 13. On Sundays he sang as he did during school and was particularly noted for his passion and talent at singing.

== 1802 – Joins Prussian Army ==
On 11 May 1802, when Karl was 15 years old, the District Administrator at the Liebenwalde Domain Office received a letter from Captain von Bilow of General von Winning's Infantry Regiment garrisoned in Berlin.

"General von Winning would like to see and speak to Cantor Reyher's son, Karl Friedrich Wilhem, in order to test his knowledge of arithmetic and writing. Since the General would probably subsequently be inclined to provide him service in the regiment, and because of his size he should not escape soldier's status, the young Reyher could subsequently benefit greatly if he made use of the general's kindness, which is expected from his knowledge.

I ask your High Honor to have Reyher arrive at my apartment on May 20th at 7 a.m. Berlin, 30 April 1802. von Bilow, Captain"

Karl and his father hurried to Berlin. General von Winning was impressed with the young man and after passing a short exam, Karl was sworn in to the Regiment on 20 May 1802.

General von Winning looked after the young recruit and due to Karl's good handwriting, quickly promoted him to the position of regimental clerk. Karl wrote back to his father, "Think of my enormous luck: I became a regimental clerk!"

He was assigned to the Regiment's 1st Battalion, commanded by Major von Rathenow. The Major also was impressed by Karl, often inviting him to dinner. The young Reyher became devoted and loyal to both the General and the Major.

== 1806 – First Experience with War ==
When Prussia finally went to war with France in October 1806, General von Winning's infantry regiment was eventually part of Lt. General von Rüchel's corps. Reyher was given a special assignment by Lt. Colonel von Rathenow, his commanding officer, just before the Battle of Jena. He was to stay with the baggage train and given the keys to take charge of the regiment's cash and pay wagon.

Reyher spent the week after the Prussian defeat and rout of October 14 guarding the wagon, bringing it safely to Magdeburg, where he was reunited with his wounded commander, von Rathenow. However, on October 23 Prince Hohenlohe ordered all troops that were not part of the fortress garrison to leave. So Reyher was ordered to take the cash wagon to Prenzlau. But while on the way, Prince Hohenlohe's corps surrendered after French Marshal Murat bluffed the Prince into surrendering at the Battle of Prenzlau on October 28.

The column of wagons forming the baggage train was 12 miles from Prenzlau on the road to Pasewalk when adjutants of the Prince's corps arrived with the news of the Prince's capitulation, and the orders that the entire baggage train should return to Prenzlau to be surrendered to the French. Reyher disobeyed this order and decided to press on to Pasewalk.

In order to avoid the ensuing confusion and chaos amongst the baggage train, Reyher turned off the main road and tried to hide the wagon, having been abandoned by the few soldiers directly assigned to him. Arriving at a small village with his tired horses, he attempted to get help from the local bailiff but he was refused as the official feared the French more than Reyher and threatened to reveal the wagon's location if asked. Reyher was forced to return to the main road to Pasewalk and eventually was captured by the French forces in the area.

Along with other prisoners of war of his regiment under the command of Captain von Zglinitzky, Reyher was able to escape while being transported by the French. Reyher decided that there were too many French between him and any remaining free Prussian forces, so he returned to the nearby home village of Groß Schönebeck and stayed at his parents' house until the end of the war.

== 1807 – Joins Ferdinand von Schill ==
On 9 July 1807 Napoleon forced Prussia to reduce the size of its army in the terms of the Treaty of Tilsit. Many Prussian soldiers were left without a position or unit. Despite Prussia's defeat, Reyher still wanted to serve in the army.

News spread that Ferdinand von Schill, the 'hero of Kolberg', was expanding his detachment of free forces. On August 3, Reyher left his parents' home in Groß Schönebeck and sailed from Stettin to Cammin, and then on August 9 arrived in Treptow on the Rhine to meet Schill.

At the time, Schill's independent detachment was still mostly made up of troops that had served with him in the 'behind the lines' raids he led in the area around Kolberg from December 1806 through May 1807. As one of the few Prussian success stories from the disastrous War of the Fourth Coalition, the stories of Schill's raids had made Schill famous. The tales were already transforming him from an unknown Lieutenant before the war, into a mythic and legendary hero.

Schill not only accepted Reyher into his detachment, but also promoted him to Sergeant. After Reyher passed a special exam on August 10 in Kamiss, the temporary cantonment location, Schill assigned him as his staff secretary.

Reyher was now part of Schill's independent force. It consisted of 5 squadrons of cavalry, 1 mounted Jäger detachment, 7 companies of infantry, and 1 company of foot Jäger (infantry).

A year passed, and in September 1808, due to a general reorganization of the Prussian army in the aftermath of its defeat, Schill's independent FreiKorps was dissolved, reorganized, and renamed. The infantry was transferred to the Guard infantry regiment as 'The Light Battalion von Schill' of 4 companies. The cavalry was formed into a Hussar regiment of 4 squadrons and given the new regimental designation of "2nd Brandenburg Hussar Regiment von Schill", under now Major Schill's direct command. The mounted Jager detachment continued to exist unchanged with a strength of up to 60 horses, but had to be included in the budget of the 2nd Brandenburg Hussar regiment. But the company of foot Jager was moved out of Schill's control and assigned to the East Prussian Jager-Battalion. All of which the young Sergeant Reyher witnessed closely as Schill's secretary.

Schill's celebrity status led him to be a central part of Berlin's social life under French occupation. Schill factored into every Prussian political faction's ideas for how to recover Prussia's pride and independence.

By early 1809, tensions between Austria and France were rising once again – and despite King Frederick William III of Prussia's best efforts to keep control of the situation, many Prussian groups planned to use a potential war between France and Austria as cover to start open rebellion against the occupation not only of Prussia but in the other German provinces as well, with or without the King's approval. Major Schill was actively planning to use his new regiment to fight if the opportunity arose. Schill was in secret contact with many other like-minded officers, citizens, and officials, including a Prussian quasi-secret society known as the Tugendbund.

== 1809 – Schill's Rebellion ==
Reyher participated in the April–May 1809 Schill's Rebellion. Major Schill marched his regiment out of their Berlin quarters and eventually into King Jerome's Kingdom of Westphalia. Reyher even led a charge at the small Battle of Dodendorf.

== 1815 and Beyond ==
After the end of the war, Reyher initially stayed in France with the occupying troops. There he taught, among other things, at a field warfare school. In 1818 he returned to Prussia and served on the General Staff . In 1824 Reyher became chief of the general staff of the VI. Army Corps and raised to the Prussian nobility as a major on 20 September 1828 in Berlin. In 1830 he became chief of general staff of the army corps commanded by Prince Wilhelm. In 1840 Reyher moved to the War Ministry and became head of the General War Department.

== 1820 – Marriage and Children ==
Reyher married Ida Charlotte Baumann (1797–1874) in Königsberg on 31 July 1820. She was the eldest daughter of District President Baumann. The marriage resulted in four children:

- Pauline († 1870), lady-in-waiting
- Maria Karoline Elisabeth (1828–1896) ⚭ 1856 Alfons von Bojanowski (1805–1868), Prussian lieutenant general
- Ida Mathilde (1830–1879)
- Anna Luise Henriette (* 1836) ⚭ Armand von Hilchenbach (* 1829), Hessian chamberlain (29 March 1867 Prussian nobility)

== 1848 – Europe Revolutions ==
In the Camphausen – Hansemann Ministry in March 1848, Reyher initially took over the War Ministry for a few weeks. He was responsible for ensuring that the capital was again occupied militarily in April after the army withdrew from Berlin in March. On 1 May 1848 Reyher became chief of the army general staff. He retained this position until his death nine years later. At times he was also a member of the second chamber of the Prussian House of Representatives and was a member of the right.

== 1857 – Death and Burial ==
Reyher died on 7 October 1857. He is buried at the Invalidenfriedhof in Berlin.

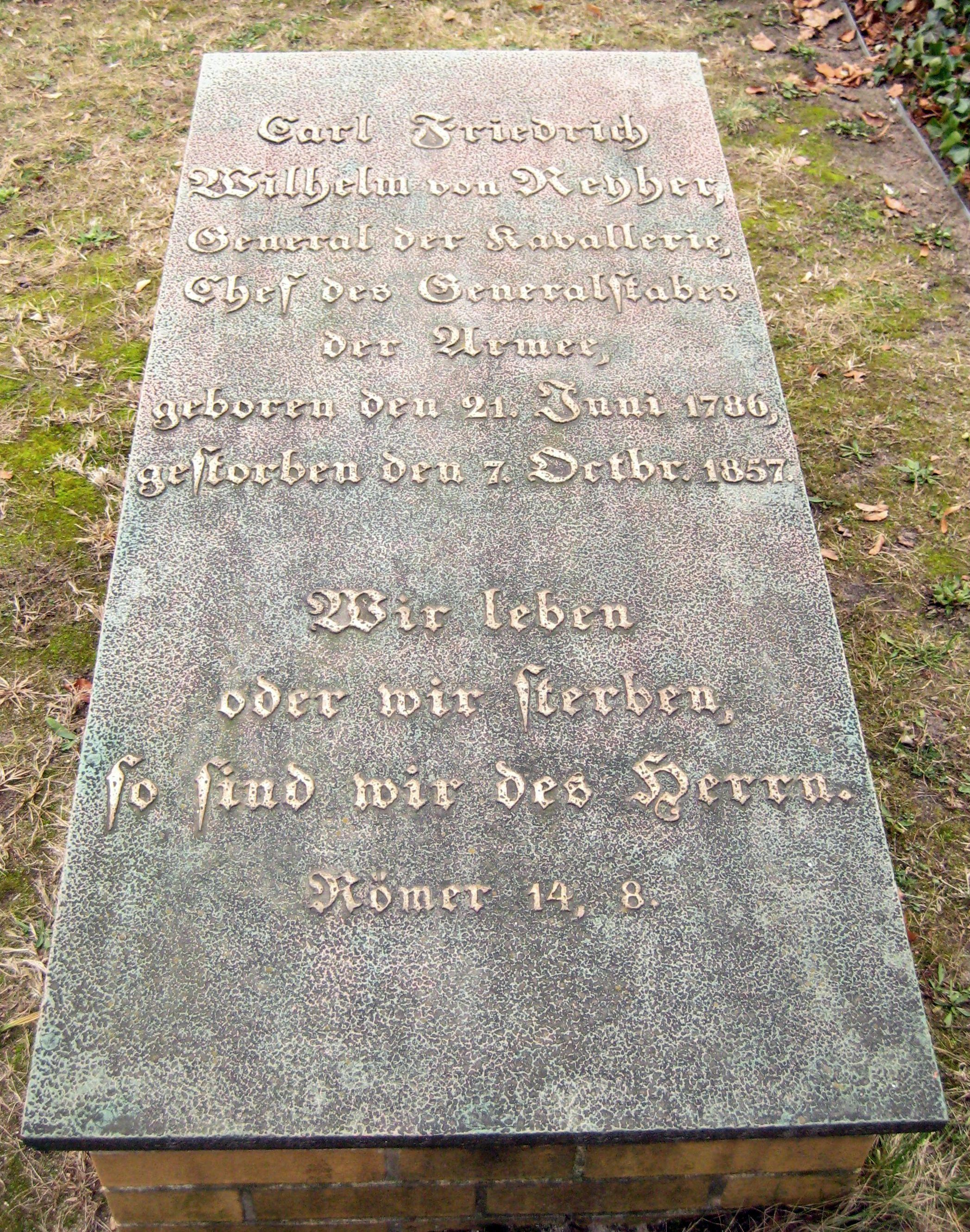
Grave of Reyher at the Invalidenfriedhof
