= 3rd (East Prussian) Cuirassiers "Count Wrangel" =

Military unit

- Kürassier-Regiment „Graf Wrangel“ (Ostpreußisches) Nr. 3
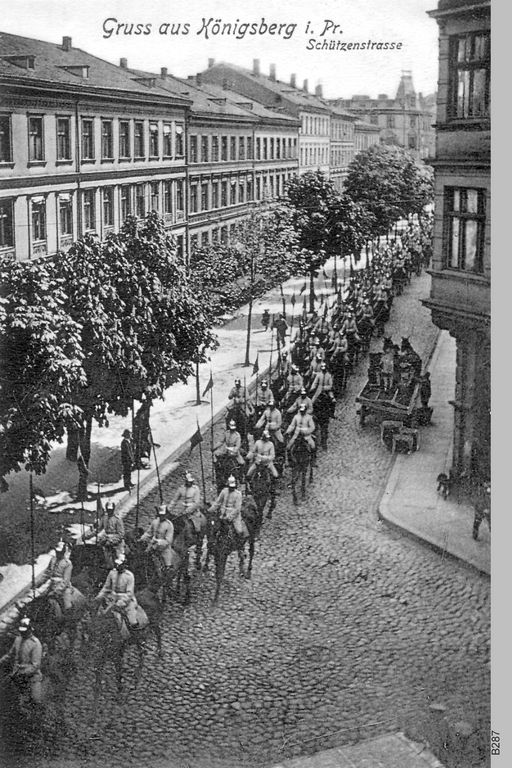
- Cuirassiers on parade in Schützenstraße, Königsberg.
- Active: 1717–1919
- Country: Prussia
- Allegiance: Prussian Army
- Branch: Army
- Type: Cavalry

The 3rd (East Prussian) Cuirassiers “Count Wrangel” (German: Kürassier-Regiment „Graf Wrangel“ (Ostpreußisches) Nr. 3), also known as the East Prussian Cuirassier Regiment (German: Ostpreußisches Kürassier-Regiment) was a heavy cavalry regiment of the Prussian Army. Formed in 1717 as a dragoon formation, the regiment was redesignated as a cuirassier formation in 1808.

== History ==
In 1717, King Frederick William I ordered the formation of a new dragoon regiment. Several dragoons of this regiment were from the Polish-Lithuanian Commonwealth. Initially, it was designated as Dragoon Regiment "von Wuthenow". In 1827, the unit was divided into Dragoon Regiment "von Cossel" and Dragoon Regiment "von Dockum". During the Second Silesian War, the regiment participated in a skirmish at Landshut as well as in the Battle of Hohenfriedberg. During the Seven Years' War, the regiment participated in the Battle of Gross-Jägersdorf, in an engagement near Stralsund, at the Battle of Zorndorf, and in the Battle of Kunersdorf.

In 1807, the regiment was renamed the Zieten Dragoon Regiment. In September 1808, it was renamed once again as the East Prussian Cuirassier Regiment. In 1813, a reserve squadron was formed within the regiment. During the War of the Sixth Coalition, the regiment participated in the Battle of Lützen as well as in the Battle of Leipzig. In the closing stages of the Battle of Leipzig, the regiment did not participate in any combat action as it had been placed in the reserve. From 14 October until 16 October, the regiment suffered a total of 2 officers, 10 troopers, and 52 horses killed, as well as 4 officers, 33 troopers, and 39 horses wounded, along with 1 trooper and 2 horses missing or captured. Most of the lost horses were quickly replaced by captured French horses. In 1815, the regiment ceded its fourth squadron to form a new cuirassier regiment, the 4th Magdeburg Cuirassiers. The regiment returned to its garrison in 1816.

During the Franco-Prussian War, the regiment, under the command of Colonel von Winterfeld, was attached to the 2nd Cavalry Brigade of the 1st Cavalry Division. The unit fought in the Battle of Mars-la-Tour as well as at the Battle of Gravelotte. After the end of the Siege of Metz, the regiment was transferred to the area around Orléans, and was later deployed at Orléans and Tours against the French Army of the Loire. After the armistice, the unit remained with the occupying forces in Amboise until March 1871, when it returned to Königsberg.

At the outbreak of the First World War, the unit was deployed to the Eastern Front, where it saw action against the Russians in the Battle of Tannenberg as well as in the First Battle of the Masurian Lakes. The regiment was then deployed as cavalry on the Baltic coast in Lithuania and Courland, and participated in the capture of Riga in 1917. The regiment remained in this region until May 1918, when it was transferred to Ukraine. The regiment demobilized and was disbanded in 1919.

== See also ==
- List of Imperial German cavalry regiments
