= Walther Bronsart von Schellendorff =

Prussian general

Walther Bronsart von Schellendorf
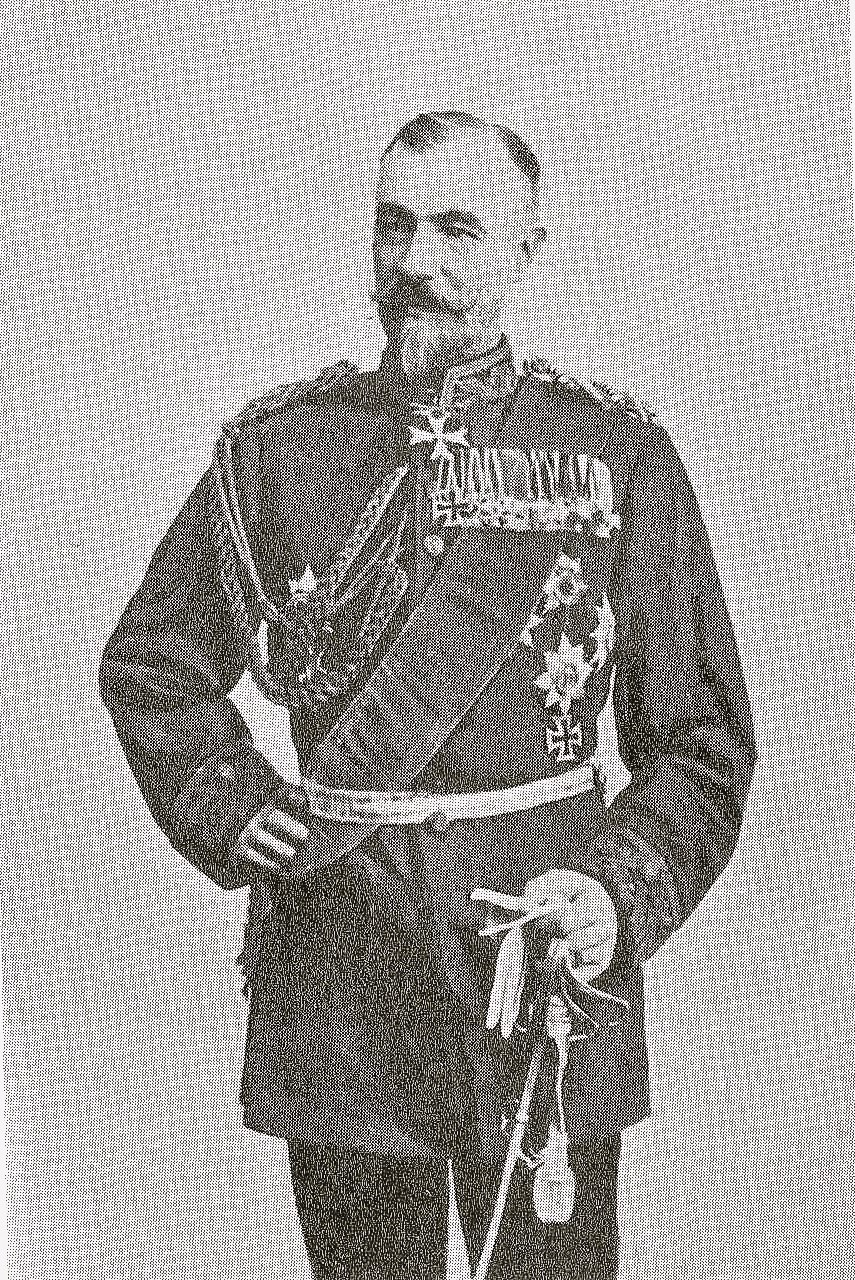
- Walther Bronsart von Schellendorf
- Born: 21 December 1833; Danzig, Prussia
- Died: 13 December 1914 (aged 80); Gut Marienhof, Mecklenburg, Imperial Germany
- Military career
- Allegiance: (Kingdom of Prussia) Prussia (German Empire) Imperial Germany
- Branch: Prussian Army
- Service years: 1852-1896
- Rank: General of the Infantry à la suite
- Commands: 89th Infantry Brigade; 34th Infantry Brigade; 17th Division; III Army Corps; X Army Corps
- Conflicts: Second Schleswig War; Franco-Prussian War
- Awards: Iron Cross; Order of the Black Eagle
- Other work: Prussian Minister of War (1893-1896)

Walther Franz Georg Bronsart von Schellendorff (21 December 1833, in Danzig – 13 December 1914, at Gut Marienhof, Amt Güstrow, Mecklenburg), Dr. jur. h.c., was a Prussian General of the Infantry à la suite, Adjutant-General to the Kaiser and King, and Prussian Minister of War.

== Biography ==
He was born into an old Prussian noble family and was the son of the Prussian Lieutenant General Heinrich Bronsart von Schellendorff (1803–1874) and Antoinette de Rège (1810–1873).

On 26 September 1863 in Altona, Bronsart von Schellendorf married Harriet Donner (born 14 November 1841 in Altona; died 21 September 1917 at Gut Marienhof, Amt Güstrow), the daughter of the Hamburg business magnate and banker Bernhard Donner, adviser to the Danish government and landowner at Schloss Bredeneek, and of Helene Schröder (from a baronial family).

He was the younger brother of Paul Bronsart von Schellendorff, and became Minister of War 10 years after him.

Bronsart von Schellendorf left cadet school in 1851 and joined the 1st Infantry Regiment and was promoted to Lieutenant in 1852. After studying at the Allgemeine Kriegsschule (General War College; later the Prussian Military Academy) from 1855 to 1858 he was made adjutant of the I Corps in 1859, after having been assigned to the 8. Jäger-Bataillon. In 1860 he was moved to the topographical department of the General Staff and in 1862 was transferred to the General Staff as a Captain.

In the Second Schleswig War in 1864, Bronsart von Schellendorff participated in the Battle of Dybbøl. He experienced the Austro-Prussian War from the headquarters of the King of Prussia. He was subsequently made a Major.

From 1866 to 1869 Bronsart von Schellendorff was on the staff of the 17th Division. In 1869 he was placed in command of a battalion of the 87th Infantry Regiment. At the outbreak of the Franco-Prussian War in 1870 he was Chief of Staff of the IX Army Corps and participated in all battles of this army corps during the war. From 1871 to 1875 he occupied the same post in the XIII Army Corps.

In 1875 Bronsart von Schellendorff was appointed commander of the 89th Infantry Brigade, and in 1879 Commander of the 34th Infantry Brigade. In 1880 he became a Major General and in 1881 was transferred as Chief of Staff to the X Army Corps.

In 1884 he became a Lieutenant General and at the same time commander of the 17th Division, and in 1888 was made general officer commanding (Kommandierender General) of the III Army Corps and in 1890 that of the X Army Corps. From January 1893 he did not have a fixed assignment, and was appointed Minister of War in October of that year. In this capacity, he defended the army against the criticisms of the Social Democrats, and announced a reform of the military criminal justice procedure as demanded by the Reichstag. Due to disagreements with the Military Cabinet, he resigned on 14 August 1896.

Bronsart von Schellendorff died in 1914 at Gut Marienhof in the Amtsbezirk Güstrow. He was also the owner of the Güstrow properties Groß- and Klein-Tessin.

== Honours and decorations ==
He received the following orders and decorations:

- Knight of the Order of the Red Eagle, 4th Class with Swords, 1864; Grand Cross with Oak Leaves and Swords on Ring, 18 January 1891 (Prussia)
- Knight of the Order of the Black Eagle, 16 March 1894; with Collar (Prussia)
- Order of the Crown, 1st class with Swords on chain (Prussia)
- Iron Cross of 1870, 1st and 2nd classes (Prussia)
- Service Award (Prussia)
- Grand Cross of the House Order of Albert the Bear (Anhalt)
- Grand Cross of the Military Merit Order (Bavaria)
- Grand Cross of the Order of Henry the Lion with swords (Brunswick)
- Grand Cross of the Ludwig Order (Hesse-Darmstadt)
- Commander 2nd class of the Order of Philip the Magnanimous with Swords (Hesse-Darmstadt)
- Military Merit Cross (Hesse-Darmstadt)
- Grand Cross in Gold of the House Order of the Wendish Crown with Crown (Mecklenburg-Schwerin)
- Grand Cross of the Order of the Griffon (Mecklenburg-Schwerin)
- Military Merit Cross, 2nd class (Mecklenburg-Schwerin)
- Honorary Grand Cross of the House and Merit Order of Peter Frederick Louis (Oldenburg)
- Order of the Rue Crown (Saxony)
- Grand Cross of the Order of the Crown, with Swords, 1894 (Württemberg)
- Order of the Double Dragon, 1st class, III (China)
- Grand Cross of the Order of the Redeemer (Greece)
- Grand Cross of the Royal Hungarian Order of St. Stephen
- Order of the Iron Crown, 3rd class (Austria)
- Grand Cross of the Order of Aviz (Portugal)
- Order of St. Anna, 1st class with Diamonds (Russia)

Political offices
Preceded by Hans von Kaltenborn-Stachau	Prussian Minister of War; 1893–1896	Succeeded by Heinrich von Gossler
