= Fritz Bronsart von Schellendorf =

German officer and politician (1864-1950)

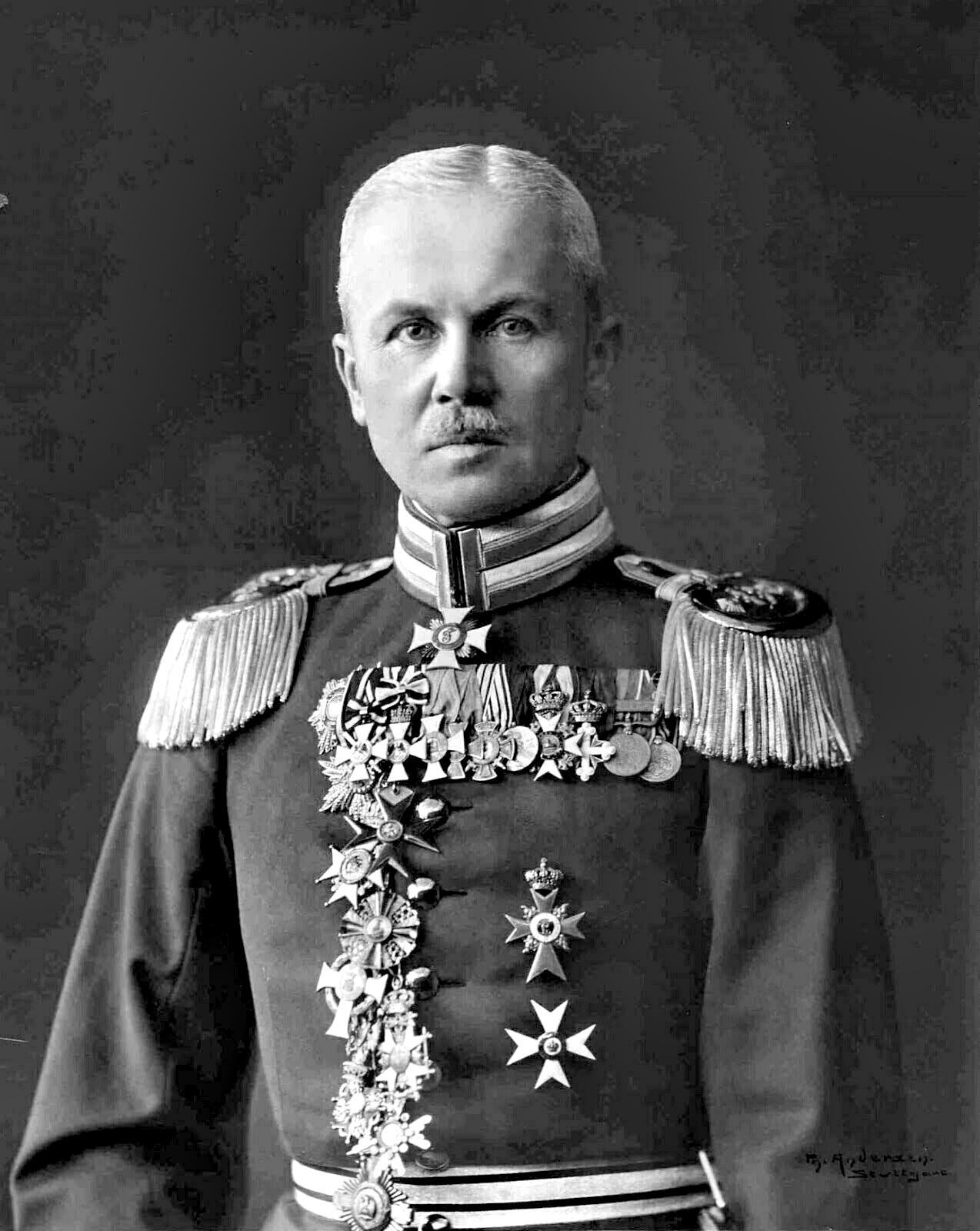
Bronsart von Schellendorf as colonel in October 1912

Friedrich (Fritz) Bronsart von Schellendorf (born 16 June 1864 in Berlin – died 23 January 1950 in Kühlungsborn) was a German officer and politician. He was the Chief of Staff of the Ottoman Army and was one of the many German military advisors assigned to the Ottoman Empire. He replaced Otto Liman von Sanders who was assigned to the Aegean region following disagreements with Enver Pasha. He was instrumental in drafting initial war plans for the Ottoman Army. Many historians consider Bronsart von Schellendorf to have been complicit in the Armenian genocide. Archives show that he issued orders to deport Armenians.

In 1919, Schellendorf wrote the following in his memoirs, as justification and confirmation for the Armenian genocide:

"Like the Jew, the Armenian outside his homeland is like a parasite, absorbing the wellbeing of the country in which he is established. This also results in hatred that has been directed against him in a medieval manner as an unwanted people, and has led to his murder."

Schellendorf was an ardent supporter of Adolf Hitler in the 1930s.
