= Gottfried Ludolf Camphausen =

German banker and politician (1803–1890)

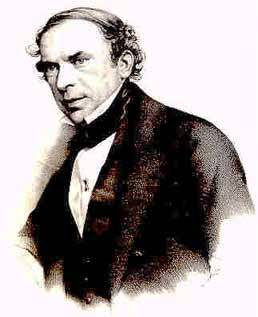

2nd Minister President of Prussia
- In office 29 March 1848 – 20 June 1848
- Monarch: Frederick William IV
- Preceded by: Adolf Heinrich von Arnim-Boitzenburg
- Succeeded by: Rudolf von Auerswald

Personal details
- Born: 10 January 1803 Geilenkirchen, Roer (department), First French Empire
- Died: 3 December 1890 (aged 87) Cologne, Kingdom of Prussia, German Empire

Gottfried Ludolf Camphausen (10 January 1803 – 3 December 1890) was a Rhenish banker and politician who served as a Prime Minister of Prussia.

== Life ==
During the Revolutions of 1848 in Germany, Ludolf Camphausen stepped suddenly from his banker's desk at Cologne to the presidential chair of the Ministry of State at Berlin, being called by King Frederick William IV of Prussia to succeed Count Arnim-Boitzenburg as prime minister, on 29 March. Ludolf availed himself largely of his younger brother's (Otto) proven business talents, and the two might have succeeded had they not to encounter the insincerity of the monarch on the one side, and the distrust of the Radical and Progressist majority of the Assembly on the other side.

Both Ludolf and Otto Camphausen were moderate Liberals – too Liberal to suit the views of the king and of the reactionary feudalist clique around him, and too Conservative for the impatience of the men of progress. Less than three months sufficed to convince Ludolf Camphausen of this fact, and already on 20 June he tendered his resignation to the king.

One month later Camphausen was sent as Prussian representative to the Frankfurt Parliament. Here he remained until April 1849, when he finally resigned, and went back to his banking business at Cologne, thoroughly disenchanted of the alluring illusions of power and office.

== See also ==
- Camphausen cabinet
