= Autumn Crisis of 1850 =

German political-military conflict

German Autumn Crisis 1850 between the states of the Union (yellow) and the states represented in the Bundestag (pink and dark red)

Autumn Crisis or November Crisis is the name given to a political-military conflict in Germany in 1850. In this conflict, the ultra-conservative Austrian Empire led those German states that wanted to restore the German Confederation after the revolution of 1848-1849, while Prussia wanted to create a new federal-state (the Erfurt Union). This almost led to war in Germany, which was finally avoided by Prussia's backing down.

This Austrian-Prussian opposition had arisen in the spring of 1849: although the Frederick William IV of Prussia rejected the Frankfurt Constitution, he promptly made the German states an offer to establish a German empire on a more conservative basis. The king's half-heartedness had already caused this Erfurt Union to fail, de facto, in the spring of 1850. Still, the conflict with Austria and its allies came to a head in the course of that year. The core of the conflict was the situation in the state of Kurhessen.

Austria and Bavaria intended to invade Kurhessen on behalf of the German Confederation in order to assist the beleaguered prince there. However, the military roads that connected the western part of Prussia with the eastern part ran through Kurhessen. Prussia wanted to protect these roads militarily.

After there had already been an exchange of fire in Hesse, the Russian tsar, Nicholas I, mediated between the two sides. Prussia had to fear democratic uprisings in the event of war; moreover, Russia would have supported Austria. Therefore, in the Punctation of Olmütz of November 29, 1850, Prussia abandoned its Union policy and agreed to the restoration of the German Confederation. Prussia negotiated conferences in Dresden to discuss a possible reform of the Confederation. However, these conferences resulted in only minor changes, so that in the summer of 1851 the old German Confederation was essentially restored.

== German Dualism, or: the Austro-Prussian rivalry ==
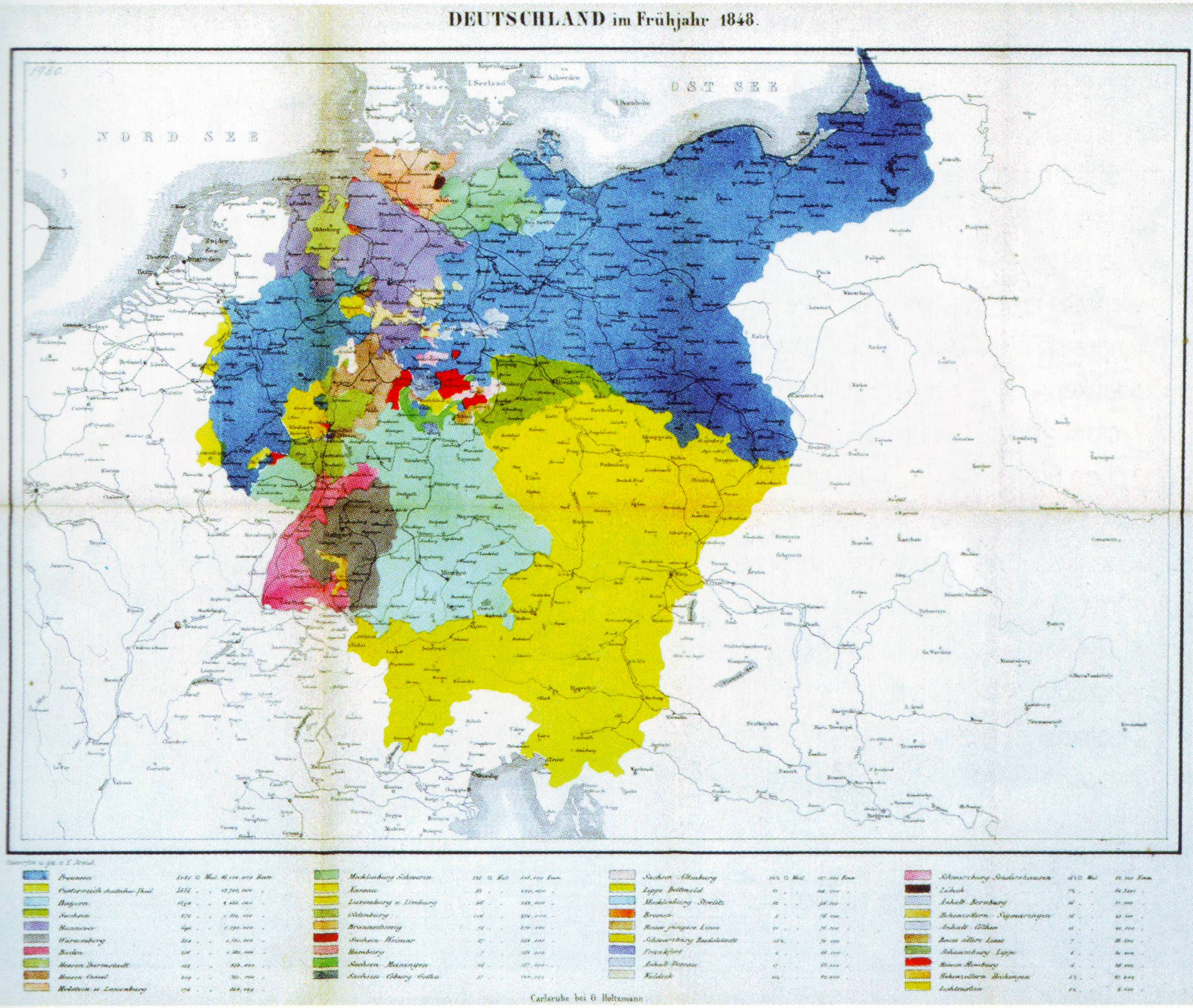
Contemporary map from 1850, with the member states of the Confederation. Prussia in blue, Austria in yellow. (The utmost eastern provinces of Prussia, Westpreußen, Ostpreußen and Posen, have been part of the Confederation in 1848–1851.) Although Prussian and its allies tried to create the Erfurt Union, they were officially still member states of the Confederation.

Since the end of the Middle Ages, Habsburg Austria had been the main power in the Holy Roman Empire. However, by the 18th century at the latest, Prussia in North Germany rose to power, so that a rivalry between the two powers developed, the so-called German Dualism. After 1815, both became members, albeit not in their full territory, of the new German Confederation. The Confederation was essentially a military alliance, but also served to suppress liberal, democratic and national movements.

In the revolutionary period of 1848-1849, Austria rejected a German nation-state, whether with or without parts of Austria. Instead, it wanted to see the old German Confederation restored as a pure confederation of states, at best with minor changes, but without a national parliament or national executive (government). Austria's maximum goal, officially since March 1849, was a Greater Austria, i.e. a German confederation including all areas of Austria that had hitherto been outside the confederation.

Prussia, on the other hand, had given signals during this period that it might support a Lesser Germany solution under Prussian leadership, i.e., a German nation-state without Austria. In April 1849, Prussian King Frederick William IV had rejected the liberal Frankfurt Constitution, but immediately proposed a unification project that later became known as the Erfurt Union. Although the smaller states and the kingdoms of Saxony and Hanover joined in May 1849 (the Three Kings' Alliance), those two kingdoms fell away over the course of the months, as did a number of small states, including Kurhessen in May 1850.

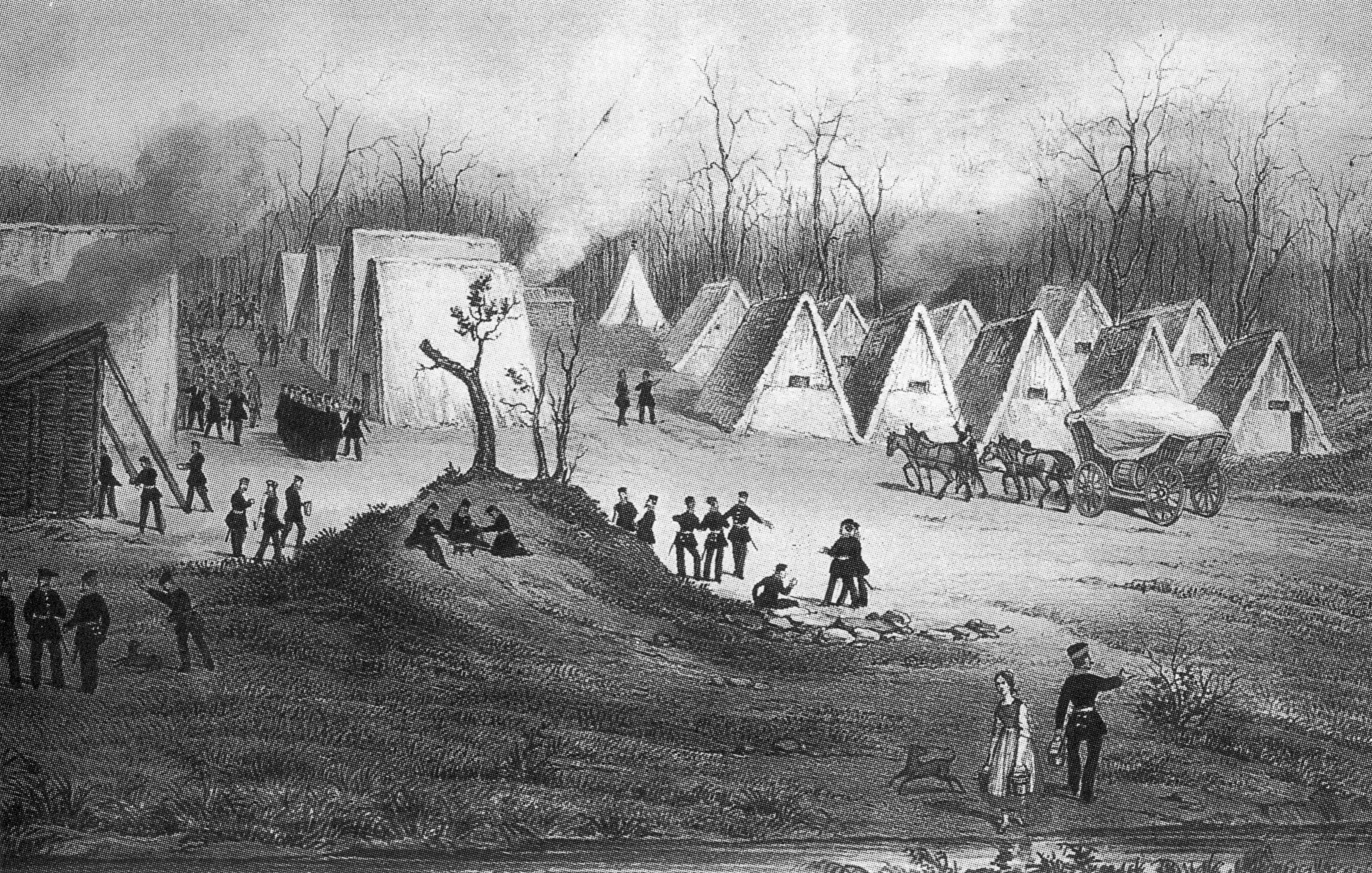
Camp site of the Schleswig-Holstein army at Rendsburg, 1850

In April 1848, the people of the duchies of Schleswig and Holstein had rebelled against their sovereign, Duke Frederick VII, who was also the King of Denmark. This Schleswig-Holstein uprising led to a war that was interrupted several times by armistices. Prussia and other German states intervened on the side of the Schleswig-Holsteiners. This became an official federal war (Bundeskrieg) of the German Confederation, decided on by the old Bundestag that was still in power in early 1848. Denmark, however, was diplomatically supported by the great powers Britain and Russia.

At the beginning of 1849, the revolutionary German Empire, as the successor to the German Confederation, had established a new government in Schleswig-Holstein (Statthalterregierung). From July 10, 1849, however, the people of Schleswig-Holstein were left to their own devices, as Prussia had concluded an armistice with Denmark (Treaty of Berlin). According to the armistice, only Holstein was to be governed by the new government, Schleswig came under a commission controlled by Denmark. In the Peace of Berlin of July 2, 1850, Prussia completely abandoned the new government: Denmark was allowed to restore its rule militarily in Holstein as well and, if necessary, to call on the German Confederation for help.

== Conflict in Kurhessen ==
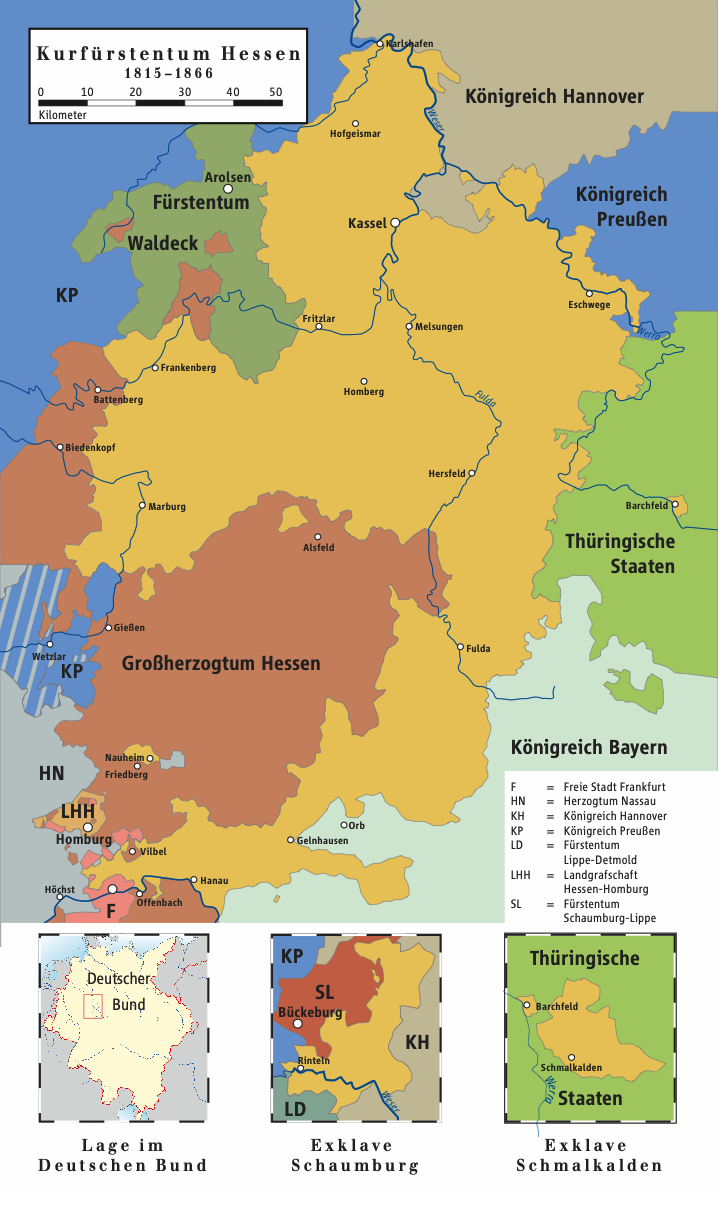
Kurhessen with Schmalkalden and Schaumburg 1815–1866

Prince-elector Friedrich Wilhelm appointed an ultraconservative head of government, Ludwig Hassenpflug, in February 1850. Since the Hessian Parliament did not approve Hassenpflug's budget, the elector dissolved it twice (June 12 and September 2). Unconstitutionally, the elector then enabled the budget by decree. Because the deputies, the courts and the civil servants protested against it, the elector placed the country under a state of war on September 7, also contrary to the constitution. However, the lieutenant general in charge referred to his constitutional oath and asked to be dismissed. The entire state apparatus defied the elector.

The elector based his measures on law of the Confederation, primarily on the Six Articles of June 28, 1832, according to which the state parliament could not deny the monarch the means necessary to fulfill federal obligations. What was questionable about this line of argument was not only whether the Six Articles justified the Hessian breach of the constitution: on April 2, 1848, the Bundestag had abolished such exceptional laws as the Six Articles. When the Hessian government fled the capital of Kassel on September 12, it called on the Bundestag to intervene according to Article 26 of the constitution of the Confederation (Wiener Schlussakte). The federal intervention was to suppress resistance in Kurhessen by force. However, Article 26 presupposed that a government, that was to be supported by the Confederation, had itself behaved constitutionally.

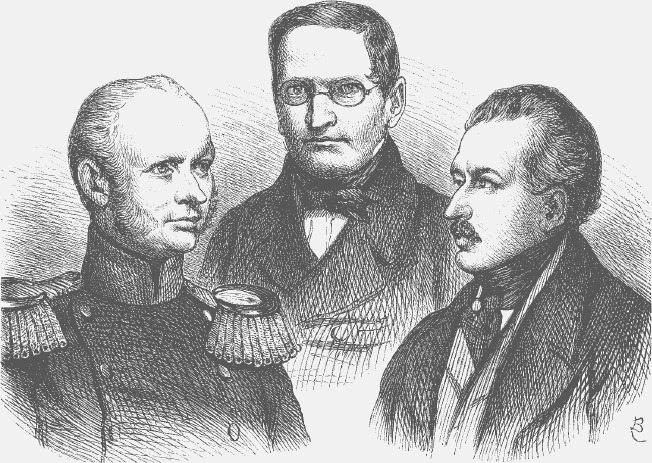
The most important advisers of the Prussian king: Graf Brandenburg, Otto von Manteuffel and Radowitz. Radowitz was a national conservative who was eager to create a German nation-state similar to Britain.

For Prussia, the events in Kurhessen were of immense importance: the western part of Prussia (Rhineland, Westphalia) was geographically separated from the eastern part (Brandenburg, Silesia, etc.), and important connecting roads ran through Kurhessen. There was a Prussian-Hessian convention about two specific roads since 1834, according to which Prussian troops were allowed to use them for transit. It was already a minor disaster for Prussia when Kurhessen left the Erfurt Union in May 1850 and joined the Austria-led Bundestag instead. This divided the Union into two halves with no connection. Furthermore, Kurhessen became a land corridor through which troops of the Confederation could also reach Holstein via Hanover.

== Aggravation in autumn ==
In the course of 1849 and 1850, Austria succeeded in gathering around itself a group of states that saw the old federal law still in force and wanted to restore the Bundestag. Prussia and its allies, on the other hand, rejected the incomplete Bundestag as a "rump Bundestag" that could not exercise the old federal rights of the Bundestag. By the Peace of Berlin of July 1850, however, Prussia had recognized federal law in principle because it had agreed to a possible intervention of the Confederation in Denmark. During the first months of 1850, moreover, the Prussian government had pursued the Union project only very half-heartedly, since it deemed the draft constitution of the Union to be still too liberal.

=== Decisions of September and agreement in October ===
On September 2, 1850, the Bundestag considered itself renewed, as twelve of the old member states had rejoined. The Bundestag prepared the legal requirements for federal intervention in Holstein, which the Danish king had requested in his capacity as duke of Holstein, a member state of the Confederation. On October 12, there was again a federal commission to discuss such cases. To this end, on September 21, the Bundestag sided with the Hessian elector: the Bundestag reserved all measures to support the elector in the restoration of his sovereign authority in Kurhessen.

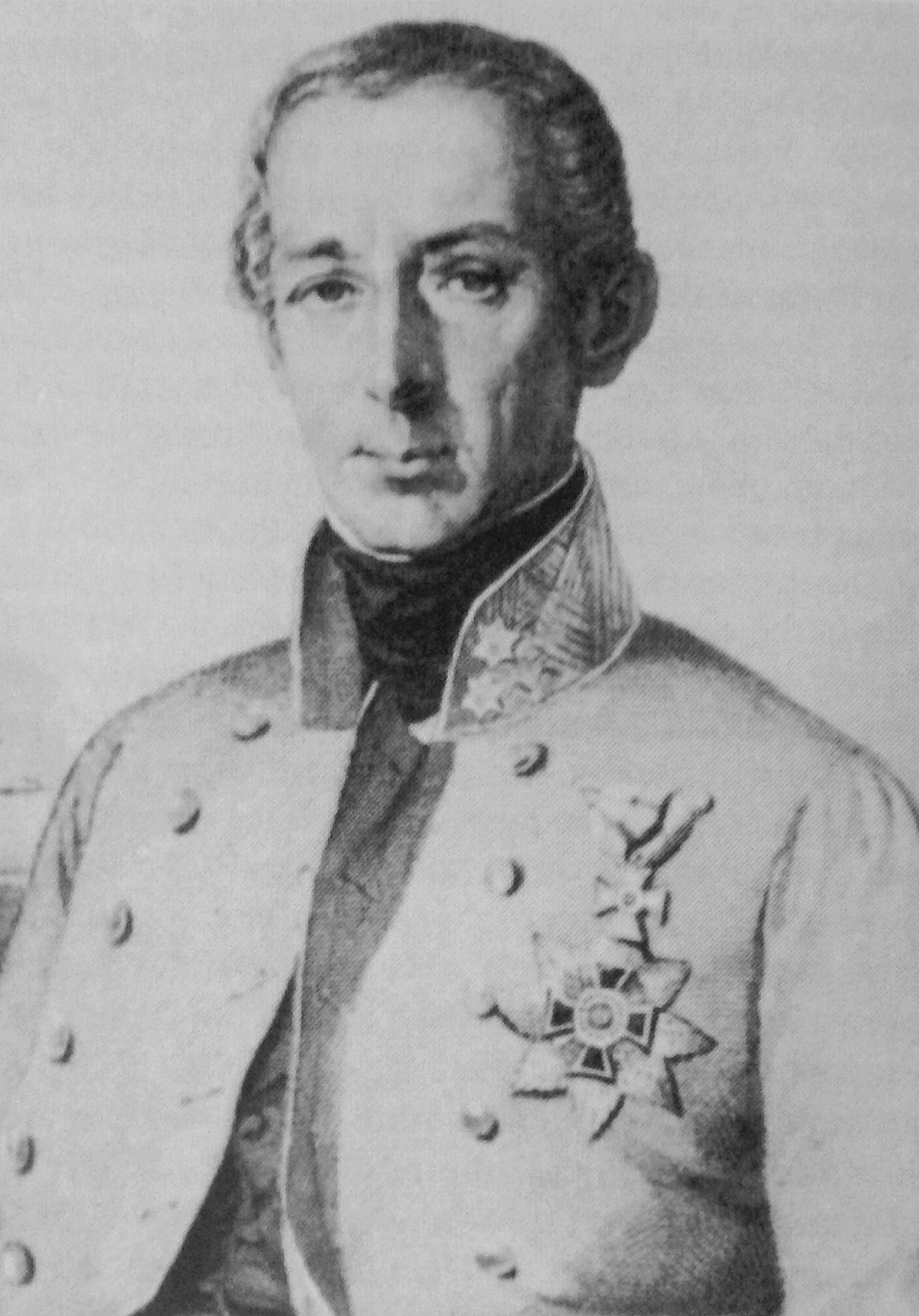
The prime minister of Austria, Felix Fürst zu Schwarzenberg

Prussia saw the September resolutions of the Bundestag as a threat to its existence and disputed their legality. Moreover, Kurhessen was still bound by the constitution of the Erfurt Union. During this period, the king's adviser and organizer of the Union, Joseph von Radowitz, was able to warm Frederick William IV to the Union again; on September 26, 1850, Radowitz even became Prussian foreign minister. Meanwhile, Prussia's attitude encouraged resistance in Kurhessen; on October 10, almost all officers resigned so as not to have to carry out the orders of the elector. Historian Ernst Rudolf Huber points out the contradiction that Prussia, on the one hand, placed military discipline above all else and had thus successfully put down the revolution of 1849, but on the other hand, now Prussia had a vested interest in the passive resistance of the Hessian army.

Austria and its most powerful allies, Bavaria and Württemberg, signed the Bregenz Treaty on October 12. It stipulated that Bavaria took upon itself the federal intervention in Kurhessen; if Prussia opposed it, the three treaty partners would bring Prussia to its knees with a federal execution. To Prussia, the treaty looked like a threat of war. To defuse the conflict, Prussian prime minister Friedrich Wilhelm von Brandenburg and his Austrian counterpart Prince Felix of Schwarzenberg, among others, met in Warsaw on October 25. Under Russian pressure, they signed an agreement in which Prussia essentially abandoned its Union policy in exchange for the prospect of future reform of the Confederation.

=== Events in Kurhessen in November ===
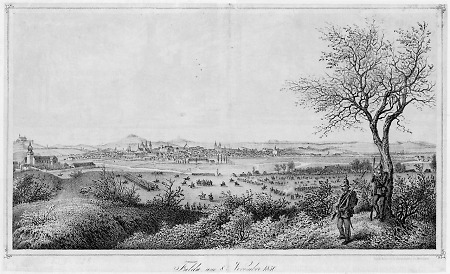
At Fulda on November 8, 1850, with Prussian soldiers in the foreground

However, the settlement of the conflict was undermined by events in Kurhessen in early November 1850. On October 26, the Bundestag decided to invade, and on November 1, Bavarian-Austrian troops entered Kurhessen. In the dispute that then broke out again in the Prussian cabinet, the ministers who were willing to reach an agreement still retained the upper hand; Prussia only demanded of Vienna that the Prussian stage roads in Kurhessen not be affected.

Austria, however, demanded that Prussia withdraw its troops in Kurhessen, which were supposed to secure the roads. This, however, seemed to the Prussian cabinet to be an unbearable imposition. Frederick William IV ordered general mobilization on November 5. On November 8, Prussian and Bavarian troops exchanged fire near Bronnzell (south of Fulda); officers intervened, however, and prevented further fighting.

Still, on November 21, the king opened the Landtag of Prussia with a bellicose speech justifying mobilization. Three days later, Schwarzenberg issued an ultimatum demanding Prussia's complete withdrawal from Kurhessen within 48 hours. But Otto von Manteuffel, the new Prussian prime minister since November 6, managed to meet with Schwarzenberg.

== Conclusion ==
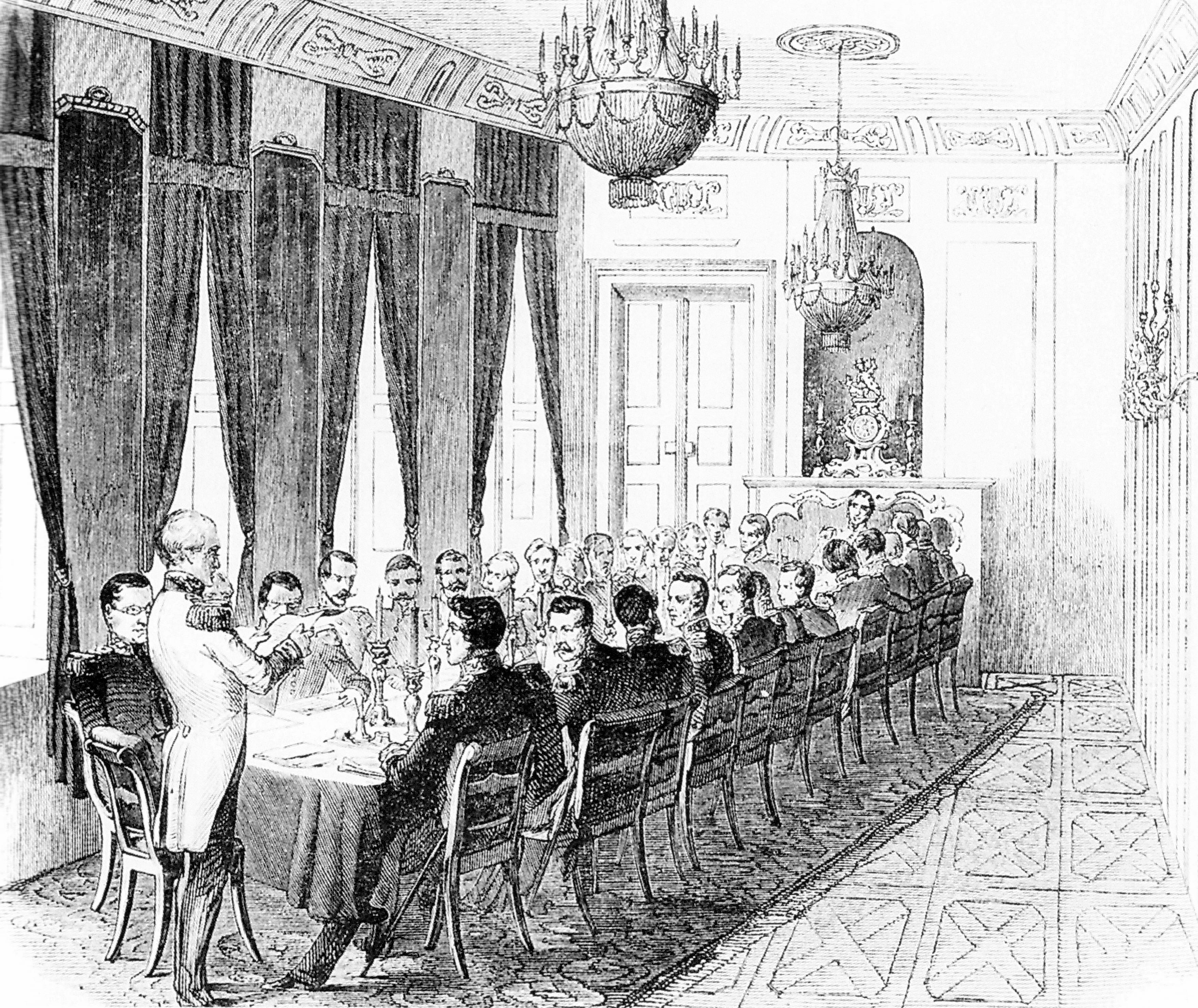
Ministerial conference in Dresden: standing Austria's Schwarzenberg, with Prussian's Manteuffel sitting to his left

Prussia shied away from the risk of war against troops of the Confederation and Russia and finally abandoned the Erfurt Union. Radowitz had already left the cabinet on November 2. Manteuffel signed the Punctation of Olmütz with Austria on November 29. It confirmed the Warsaw Agreement and agreed on demobilization on both sides. On December 2, the Prussian cabinet ratified the agreement. The ultra conservative Manteuffel emerged strengthened and remained prime minister for eight years; Schwarzenberg, who had never wanted war with Prussia, was also a winner. He just wanted to get rid of the "radicals" (the national conservatives like Radowitz) in the Prussian government and cooperate with the ultra conservatives.

Accordingly, the German Confederation was not yet to be considered capable of acting. A ministerial conference was to discuss the questions of restoration and a federal reform demanded by Prussia. At the Dresden conferences of 1850-1851, however, neither Austria succeeded in pushing through its Greater Austria concept nor Prussia that intended to extend the tasks of the Confederation. The middle-sized states in particular feared an Austro-Prussian agreement to their disadvantage. Therefore, the old German Confederation was restored in the summer of 1851 without notable changes.

With regard to Kurhessen, Austria indirectly agreed to the presence of Prussian troops. The city of Kassel was to be occupied jointly by Austria and Prussia. Prussia withdrew its troops from other parts of the country, which were occupied by Bavaria. In Holstein, in early 1851, federal commissioners nominated by Austria and Prussia took over the rule from the government (Statthalterregierung) and later handed it over to Denmark.

An actual military confrontation between Austria and Prussia finally occurred in the summer of 1866. In the Austro-Prussian War, Prussia defeated Austria, Bavaria and the other states loyal to the Confederation. Consequently, Prussia and its allies founded the North German Confederation as a federal state in 1867.
