= Germans =

People of Germany

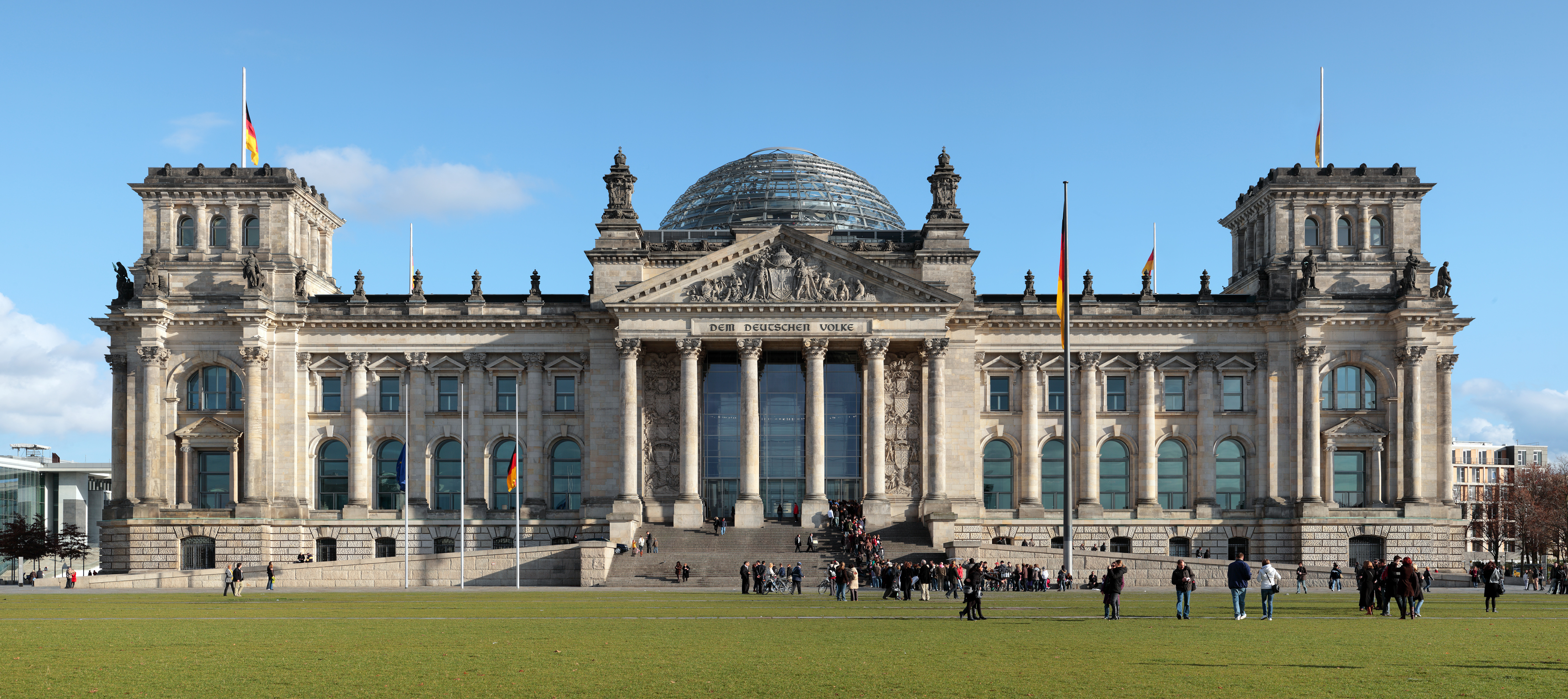
The Reichstag building, seat of the German Parliament, dedicated Dem deutschen Volke (To the German people)

Germans (German: Deutsche) are the natives or inhabitants of Germany, or sometimes more broadly any people who are of German descent or native speakers of the German language. The constitution of Germany, implemented in 1949 following the end of World War II, defines a German as a German citizen. During the 19th and much of the 20th century, discussions on German identity were dominated by concepts of a common language, culture, descent, and history. The German language remains dominant in Germany, and is still widely perceived as a necessary criterion for German "national belonging". The total number of Germans in the world is about 100 million, most of whom live in Germany.

The history of Germans as an ethnic group began with the separation of a distinct Kingdom of Germany from the eastern part of the Frankish Empire under the Ottonian dynasty in the 10th century, forming the core of the Holy Roman Empire. In subsequent centuries the political power and population of this empire grew considerably. It expanded eastwards, and eventually a substantial number of Germans migrated further eastwards into Eastern Europe. The empire itself was generally decentralized and politically divided between many small princedoms, cities and bishoprics, while the idea of unified German state came later. Following the Reformation in the 16th century, many of these states found themselves in bitter conflict concerning the rise of Protestantism.

In the 19th century, the Holy Roman Empire dissolved, and German nationalism began to grow. At the same time however, the concept of German nationality became more complex. The multiethnic Kingdom of Prussia incorporated most Germans into its German Empire in 1871, and a substantial additional number of German speakers were in the multiethnic kingdom of Austria-Hungary. During this time, a large number of Germans also emigrated to the New World, particularly to the United States. Large numbers also emigrated to Canada and Brazil, and they established sizable communities in New Zealand and Australia. The Russian Empire also included a substantial German population.

Following the end of World War I, Austria-Hungary and the German Empire were partitioned, resulting in many Germans becoming ethnic minorities in newly established countries. In the chaotic years that followed, Adolf Hitler became the dictator of Nazi Germany and embarked on a genocidal campaign to unify all Germans under his leadership. His Nazi movement defined Germans in a very specific way which included Austrians, Luxembourgers, eastern Belgians, and so-called Volksdeutsche, who were ethnic Germans elsewhere in Europe and globally. However, this Nazi conception expressly excluded German citizens of Jewish or Roma background. Nazi policies of military aggression and its persecution of those deemed non-Germans led to World War II and the Holocaust in which the Nazi regime was defeated by allied powers, including the United States, United Kingdom, and the Soviet Union. In the aftermath of Germany's defeat in the war, the country was occupied and once again partitioned. Millions of Germans were expelled from Central and Eastern Europe. In 1990, West Germany and East Germany were reunified. In modern times, remembrance of the Holocaust, known as Erinnerungskultur ("culture of remembrance"), has become an integral part of German identity.

Owing to their long history of political fragmentation, Germans are culturally diverse and often have strong regional identities. Sixteen Länder (states) make up modern Germany. Arts and sciences are an integral part of German culture, and the Germans have been represented by many prominent personalities in a significant number of disciplines, including Nobel prize laureates where Germany is ranked third among countries of the world in the number of total recipients.

== Names ==
The English term Germans is derived from the Latin geographical term Germania. These terms were ultimately derived from the ethnonym Germani, which became an umbrella term that was occasionally used to categorize some of the peoples living in and near Germania during the Roman era.

In some contexts, people of German descent are also called Germans. In historical discussions the term Germans is also occasionally used to refer to the Germanic peoples during the time of the Roman Empire.

The German endonym Deutsche is derived from the Old High German term diutisc, which means 'ethnic' or 'relating to the people'. This term was used for speakers of West-Germanic languages in Central Europe since at least the 8th century, after which time a distinct German ethnic identity began to emerge among at least some of them living within the Holy Roman Empire. However, variants of the same term were also used in the Low Countries, for the related dialects of what is still called Dutch in English, which is now a national language of the Netherlands and Belgium.

== History ==
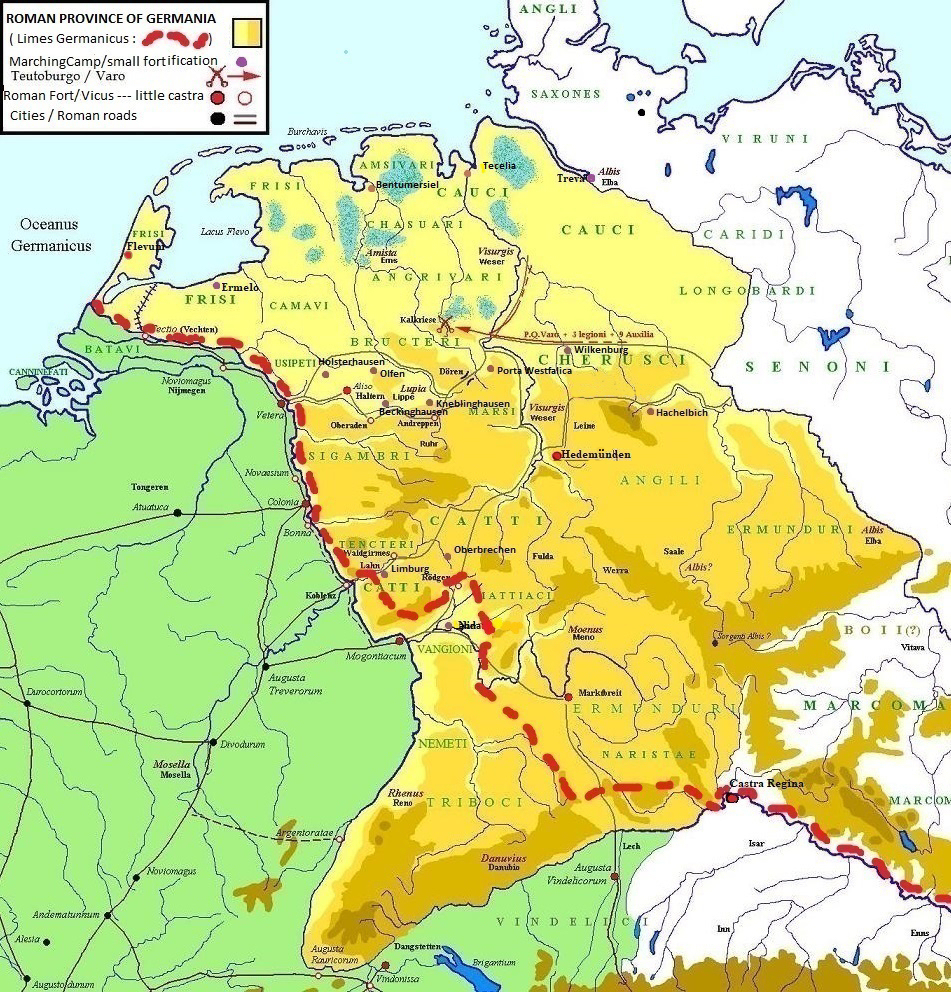
A map depicting the short-lived Roman province of Germania Antiqua, situated between the Rhine and Elbe rivers, a region which the early Roman Empire attempted to conquer and control

What it means to be a German has changed over time. As in other modern nationalities, German identity is now strongly connected to a single modern country, Germany. However, various different conceptions of German identity existed before the country took its modern form, so many historical Germans did not live in a country called Germany. This has led to some particularly notable historical dilemmas about who should be considered a German.

=== Ancient history ===
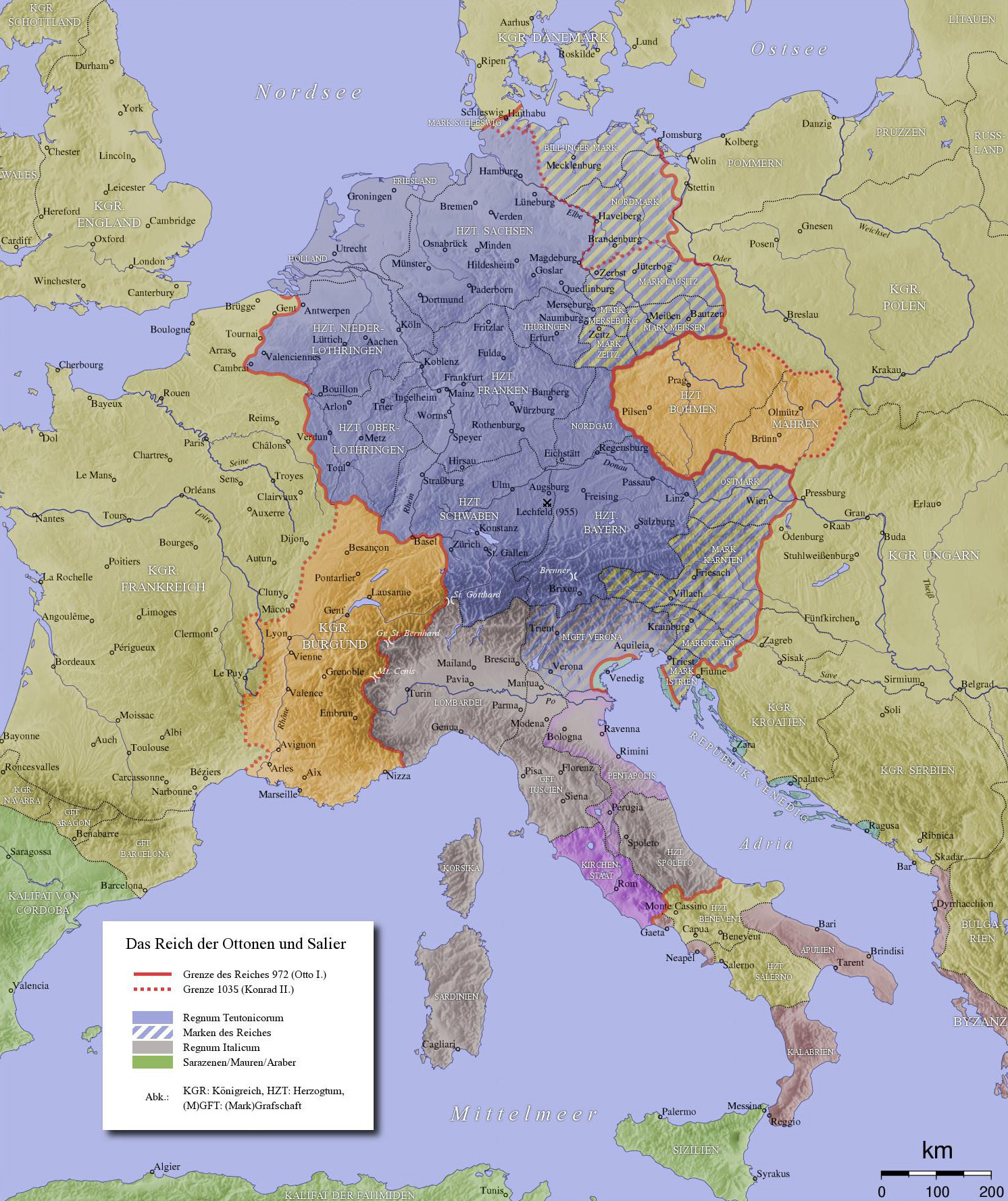
The Holy Roman Empire in 972 (red line) and 1035 (red dots) with the Kingdom of Germany, including Lotharingia, marked in blue

The modern English terms "German" and "Germany" derive from the classical geographical concept of Germania. In the first and second century, Roman geographers defined as the area between the Rhine, Danube and Vistula. The Roman general and dictator Julius Caesar, who gave an account of his conquest of Gaul in the 1st century BC, was the first author known to have used the geographical term Germania, and to define its western boundary as the Rhine. He emphasized that the Germani (Germanic peoples) east of the river were different to Gauls, and dangerous to Rome. In contrast, archaeological evidence shows that at the time of Caesar's invasion, both Gaul and Germanic regions had long been strongly influenced by the same celtic La Tène culture.

The modern German terms for Germany (Deutschland) and the Germans (die Deutsche) derive from a medieval word for the German language, and early Germanic languages started entering the Rhine area from the east in the time of Caesar. The resulting demographic situation reported by him was that migrating Celts and Germanic peoples were moving into areas which threatened the Alpine regions and the Romans. The modern German language is a descendant of the Germanic languages which spread during the Iron Age and Roman era. Scholars generally agree that it is possible to speak of Germanic languages existing as early as 500 BCE. These Germanic languages are believed to have dispersed towards the Rhine from the direction of the Jastorf culture, which was itself a Celtic influenced culture that existed in the Pre-Roman Iron Age, in the region near the Elbe river. It is likely that first Germanic consonant shift, which defines the Germanic language family, occurred during this period. The earlier Nordic Bronze Age of southern Scandinavia also shows definite population and material continuities with the Jastorf Culture, but it is unclear whether these indicate ethnic continuity.

Under Caesar's successors, after conquering Gaul the Romans began to conquer and control the entire region between the Rhine and the Elbe which centuries later constituted the largest part of medieval Germany. These efforts were significantly hampered by the victory of a local alliance led by Arminius at the Battle of the Teutoburg Forest in 9 AD, which is traditionally considered to be a defining moment in German history. While the Romans were nevertheless victorious, rather than installing a Roman administration they controlled the region indirectly for centuries, recruiting soldiers there, and playing the tribes off against each other. The early Germanic peoples were later famously described in more detail in Germania by the 1st century Roman historian Tacitus. He described them as a diverse group, dominating a much larger area than Germany, stretching to the Vistula in the east, and Scandinavia in the north.

=== Medieval history ===
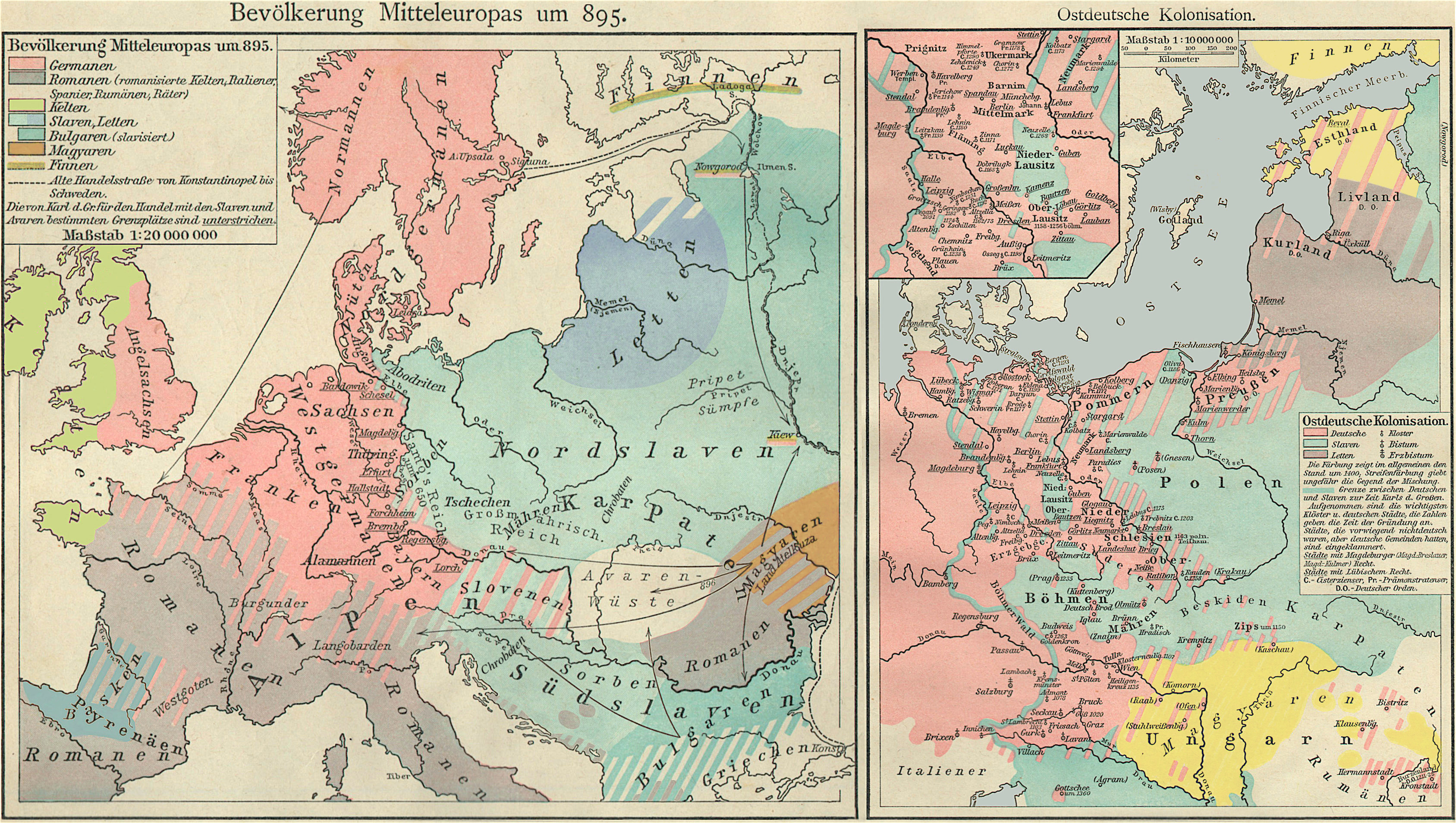
Maps depicting the Ostsiedlung, also known as the German eastward settlement. The left map shows the situation in roughly 895 AD; the right map shows it about 1400 AD. Germanic peoples (left map) and Germans (right map) are shown in light red.

The Holy Roman Empire after the Peace of Westphalia, 1648

German ethnicity began to emerge in medieval times among the descendants of those Germanic peoples who had lived under heavy Roman influence between the Rhine and Elbe rivers. This included Franks, Frisians, Saxons, Thuringii, Alemanni and Baiuvarii – all of whom spoke related dialects of West Germanic. These peoples had come under the dominance of the western Franks starting with Clovis I, who established control of the Romanized and Frankish population of Gaul in the 5th century, and began a process of conquering the peoples east of the Rhine. The regions long continued to be divided into "Stem duchies", corresponding to the old ethnic designations. By the early 9th century AD, large parts of Europe were united under the rule of the Frankish leader Charlemagne, who expanded the Frankish empire in several directions including east of the Rhine, consolidating power over the Saxons and Frisians, and establishing the Carolingian Empire. Charlemagne was crowned emperor by Pope Leo III in 800.

In the generations after Charlemagne the empire was partitioned at the Treaty of Verdun (843), eventually resulting in the long-term separation between the states of West Francia, Middle Francia and East Francia. Beginning with Henry the Fowler, non-Frankish dynasties also ruled the eastern kingdom, and under his son Otto I, East Francia, which was mostly German, constituted the core of the Holy Roman Empire. Also under control of this loosely controlled empire were the previously independent kingdoms of Italy, Burgundy, and Lotharingia. The latter was a Roman and Frankish area which contained some of the oldest and most important old German cities including Aachen, Cologne and Trier, all west of the Rhine, and it became another Duchy within the eastern kingdom. Leaders of the stem duchies which constituted this eastern kingdom — Lotharingia, Bavaria, Franconia, Swabia, Thuringia, and Saxony ― initially wielded considerable power independently of the king. German kings were elected by members of the noble families, who often sought to have weak kings elected in order to preserve their own independence. This prevented an early unification of the Germans.

A warrior nobility dominated the feudal German society of the Middle Ages, while most of the German population consisted of peasants with few political rights. The church played an important role in the Holy Roman Empire in the Middle Ages, and competed with the nobility for power. Between the 11th and 13th centuries, German speakers from the empire actively participated in five Crusades to "liberate" the Holy Land. From the beginnings of the kingdom, its dynasties also participated in a push eastwards into Slavic-speaking regions. At the Saxon Eastern March in the north, the Polabian Slavs east of the Elbe were conquered over generations of often brutal conflict. Under the later control of powerful German dynasties it became an important region within modern Germany, and home to its modern capital, Berlin. German population also moved eastwards from the 11th century, in what is known as the Ostsiedlung. Over time, Slavic and German-speaking populations assimilated, meaning that many modern Germans have substantial Slavic ancestry. From the 12th century, many German speakers settled as merchants and craftsmen in the Kingdom of Poland, where they came to constitute a significant proportion of the population in many urban centers such as Gdańsk. During the 13th century, the Teutonic Knights began conquering the Old Prussians, and established what would eventually become the powerful German state of Prussia.

Further south, Bohemia and Hungary developed as kingdoms with their own non-German speaking elites. The Austrian March on the Middle Danube stopped expanding eastwards towards Hungary in the 11th century. Under Ottokar II, Bohemia (corresponding roughly to modern Czechia) became a kingdom within the empire, and even managed to take control of Austria, which was German-speaking. However, the late 13th century saw the election of Rudolf I of the House of Habsburg to the imperial throne, and he was able to acquire Austria for his own family. The Habsburgs would continue to play an important role in European history for centuries afterwards. Under the leadership of the Habsburgs the Holy Roman Empire itself remained weak, and by the late Middle Ages much of Lotharingia and Burgundy had come under the control of French dynasts, the House of Valois-Burgundy and House of Valois-Anjou. Step by step, Italy, Switzerland, Lorraine, and Savoy were no longer subject to effective imperial control.

Trade increased and there was a specialization of the arts and crafts. In the late Middle Ages the German economy grew under the influence of urban centers, which increased in size and wealth and formed powerful leagues, such as the Hanseatic League and the Swabian League, in order to protect their interests, often through supporting the German kings in their struggles with the nobility. These urban leagues significantly contributed to the development of German commerce and banking. German merchants of Hanseatic cities settled in cities throughout Northern Europe beyond the German lands.

=== Modern history ===
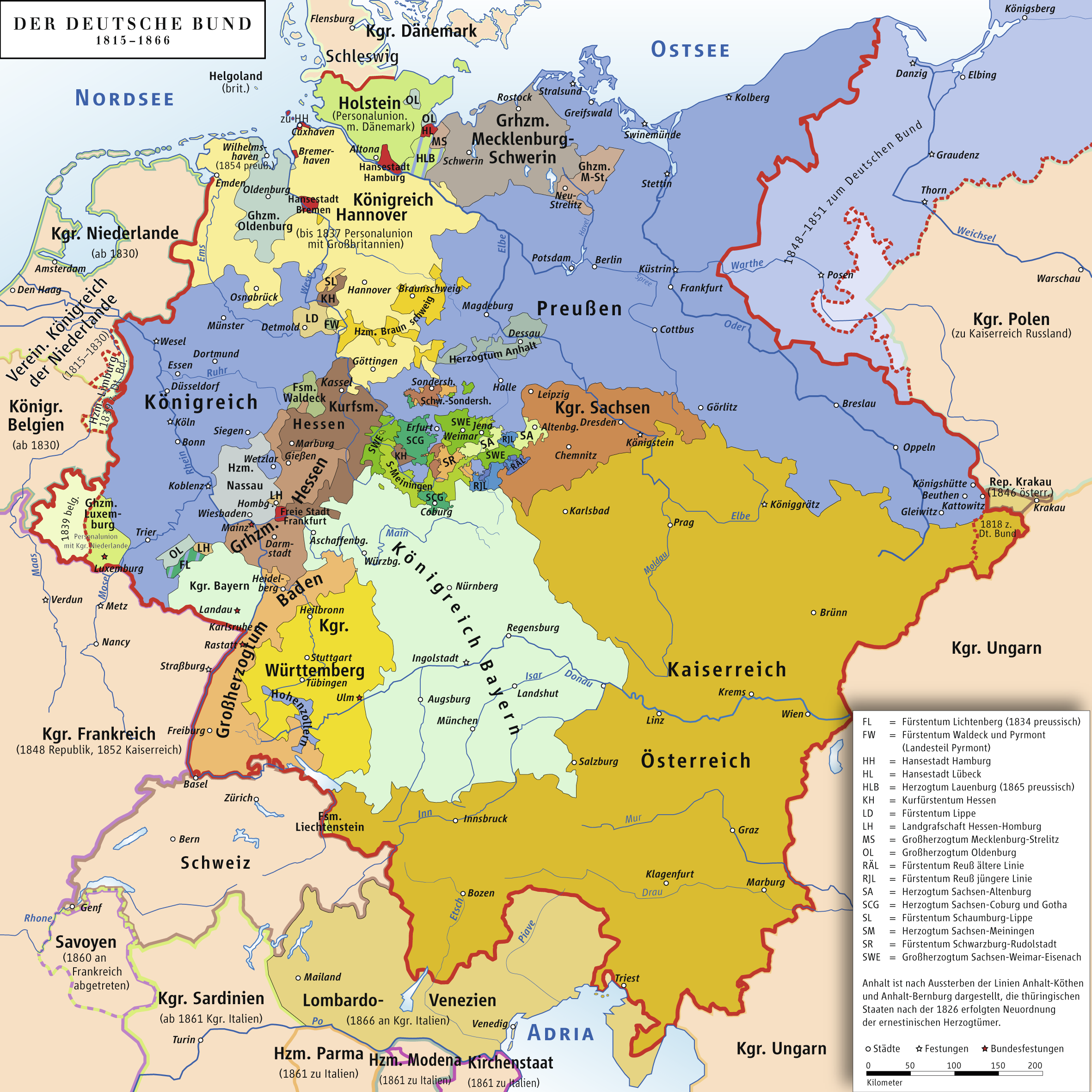
Sovereign states of the German Confederation with the boundaries of the confederation marked in red, 1815–1866

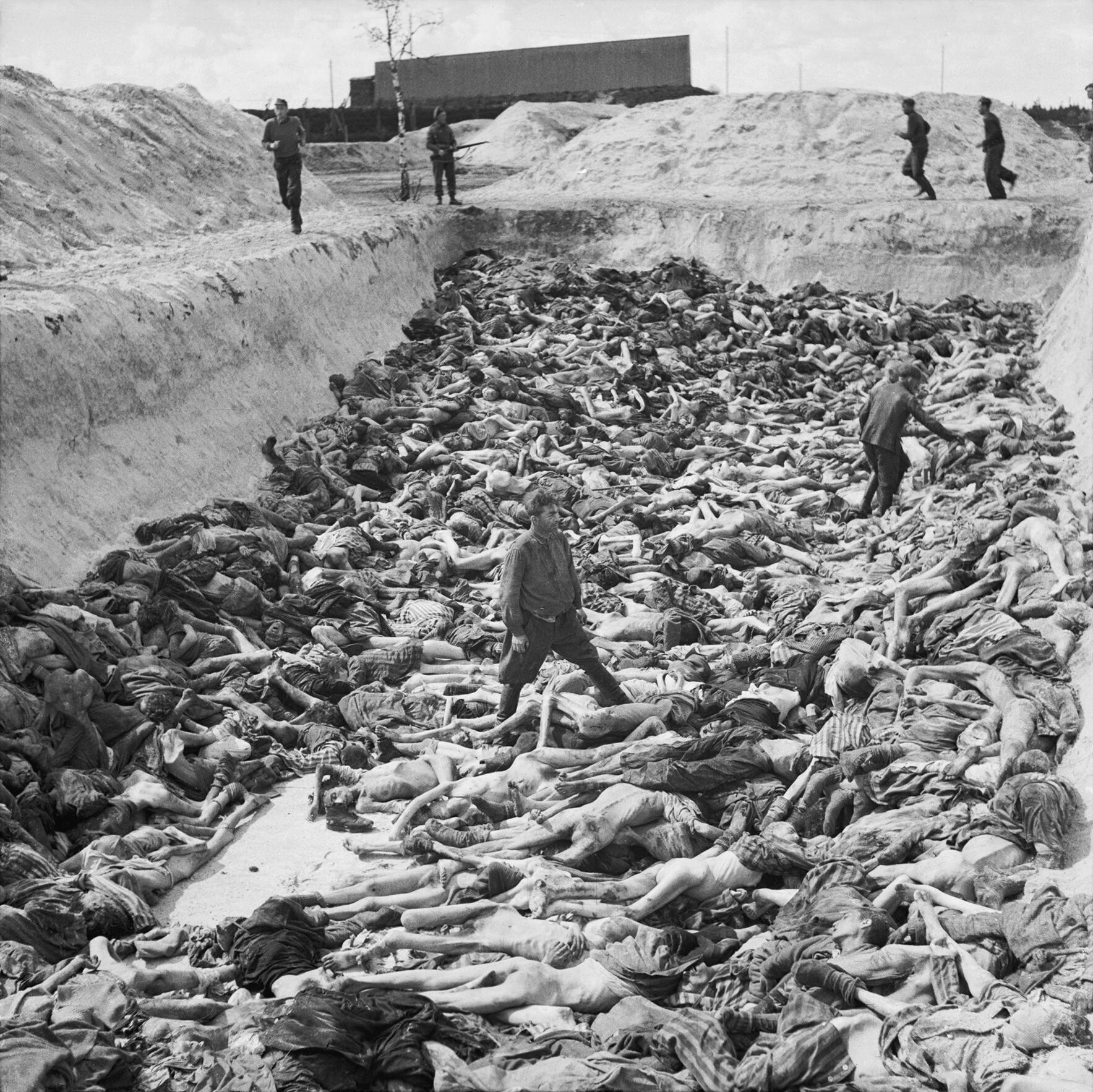
Victims of the Holocaust in a mass grave at Bergen-Belsen concentration camp

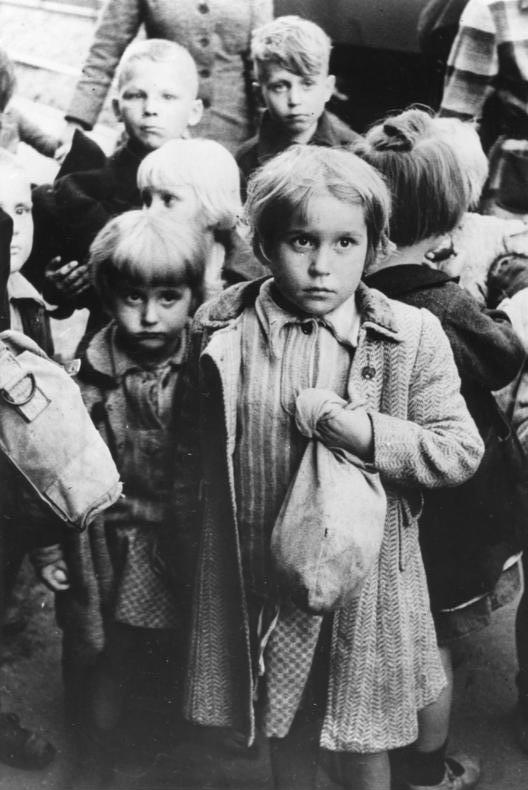
Germans expelled from Poland in 1948

The Habsburg dynasty managed to maintain their grip upon the imperial throne in the early modern period. While the empire itself continued to be largely de-centralized, the Habsburgs' personal power increased outside of the core German lands. Charles V personally inherited control of the kingdoms of Hungary and Bohemia, the wealthy Low Countries (roughly modern Belgium, Luxembourg and the Netherlands), the Kingdoms of Castile, Aragon, Sicily, Naples, and Sardinia, and the Dukedom of Milan. Of these, the Bohemian and Hungarian titles remained connected to the imperial throne for centuries, making Austria a powerful multilingual empire in its own right. On the other hand, the Low Countries went to the Spanish crown and continued to evolve separately from Germany.

The introduction of printing by the German inventor Johannes Gutenberg contributed to the formation of a new understanding of faith and reason. At this time, the German monk Martin Luther pushed for reforms within the Catholic Church. Luther's efforts culminated in the Protestant Reformation.

Religious schism was a leading cause of the Thirty Years' War, a conflict that tore apart the Holy Roman Empire and its neighbours, leading to the death of millions of Germans. The terms of the Peace of Westphalia (1648) ending the war, included a major reduction in the central authority of the Holy Roman Emperor. Among the most powerful German states to emerge in the aftermath was Protestant Prussia, under the rule of the House of Hohenzollern. Charles V and his Habsburg dynasty defended Roman Catholicism.

In the 18th century, German culture was significantly influenced by the Enlightenment.

After centuries of political fragmentation, a sense of German unity began to emerge in the 18th century. The Holy Roman Empire continued to decline until being dissolved altogether by Napoleon in 1806. In central Europe, the Napoleonic wars ushered in great social, political and economic changes, and catalyzed a national awakening among the Germans. By the late 18th century, German intellectuals such as Johann Gottfried Herder articulated the concept of a German identity rooted in language, and this notion helped spark the German nationalist movement, which sought to unify the Germans into a single nation state. Eventually, shared ancestry, culture and language (though not religion) came to define German nationalism. The Napoleonic Wars ended with the Congress of Vienna (1815), and left most of the German states loosely united under the German Confederation. The confederation came to be dominated by the Catholic Austrian Empire, to the dismay of many German nationalists, who saw the German Confederation as an inadequate answer to the German Question.

Throughout the 19th century, Prussia continued to grow in power. In 1848, German revolutionaries set up the temporary Frankfurt Parliament, but failed in their aim of forming a united German homeland. The Prussians proposed an Erfurt Union of the German states, but this effort was torpedoed by the Austrians through the Punctation of Olmütz (1850), recreating the German Confederation. In response, Prussia sought to use the Zollverein customs union to increase its power among the German states. Under the leadership of Otto von Bismarck, Prussia expanded its sphere of influence and together with its German allies defeated Denmark in the Second Schleswig War and soon after Austria in the Austro-Prussian War, subsequently establishing the North German Confederation. In 1871, the Prussian coalition decisively defeated the Second French Empire in the Franco-Prussian War, annexing the German speaking region of Alsace-Lorraine. After taking Paris, Prussia and their allies proclaimed the formation of a united German Empire.

In the years following unification, German society was radically changed by numerous processes, including industrialization, rationalization, secularization and the rise of capitalism. German power increased considerably and numerous overseas colonies were established. During this time, the German population grew considerably, and many emigrated to other countries (mainly North America), contributing to the growth of the German diaspora. Competition for colonies between the Great Powers contributed to the outbreak of World War I, in which the German, Austro-Hungarian and Ottoman Empires formed the Central Powers, an alliance that was ultimately defeated, with none of the empires comprising it surviving the aftermath of the war. Under the terms of the Treaty of Versailles, the German and Austro-Hungarian Empires were both dissolved and partitioned, resulting in millions of Germans becoming ethnic minorities in other countries. The monarchical rulers of the German states, including the German emperor Wilhelm II, were overthrown in the November Revolution which led to the establishment of the Weimar Republic. The Germans of the Austrian side of the Dual Monarchy proclaimed the Republic of German-Austria, and sought to be incorporated into the German state, but this was forbidden by the Treaty of Versailles and Treaty of Saint-Germain.

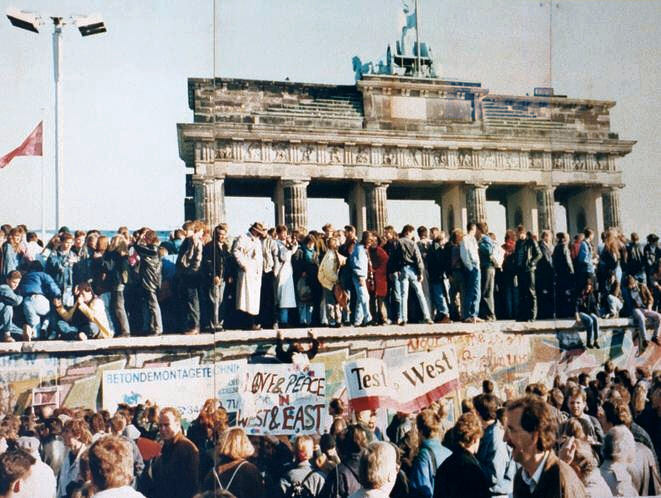
People standing on top the Berlin Wall during its fall in 1989 in front of the Brandenburg Gate

What many Germans saw as the "humiliation of Versailles", continuing traditions of authoritarian and antisemitic ideologies, and the Great Depression all contributed to the rise of Austrian-born Adolf Hitler and the Nazis, who after coming to power democratically in the early 1930s, abolished the Weimar Republic and formed the totalitarian Third Reich. In his quest to subjugate Europe, six million Jews were murdered in the Holocaust. World War II resulted in widespread destruction and the deaths of tens of millions of soldiers and civilians, while the German state was partitioned. About 12 million Germans had to flee or were expelled from Eastern Europe. Significant damage was also done to the German reputation and identity, which became far less nationalistic than it previously was. From the 1960s onward, Germany increasingly commemorated the victims of Nazi persecution through memorial sites and museums.

The German states of West Germany and East Germany became focal points of the Cold War, but were reunified in 1990. Although there were fears that the reunified Germany might resume nationalist politics, the country is today widely regarded as a "stabilizing actor in the heart of Europe" and a "promoter of democratic integration".

== Language ==
The German language in Europe: German Sprachraum: German is the official language (de jure or de facto) and first language of most of the population. German is a co-official language but not the first language of most of the population. German (or a German dialect) is a legally recognized minority language (squares: geographic distribution too dispersed/small for map scale). German (or a variety of German) is spoken by a sizeable minority but has no legal recognition.

German is the native language of most Germans, and historically many northern Germans spoke the closely related language Low German. The German language is the key marker of German ethnic identity. German and Low German are West Germanic languages closely related to Dutch, Frisian languages (in particular North Frisian and Saterland Frisian), Luxembourgish, and English. Modern Standard German is based on High German and Central German, and is the first or second language of most Germans, but notably not the Volga Germans.

== German diaspora ==
A sizable German diaspora is mostly found in the United States, Brazil, the countries of the former Soviet Union, Switzerland, Austria, Argentina, Canada, Spain, Australia, the United Kingdom, and South Africa.

== Culture ==
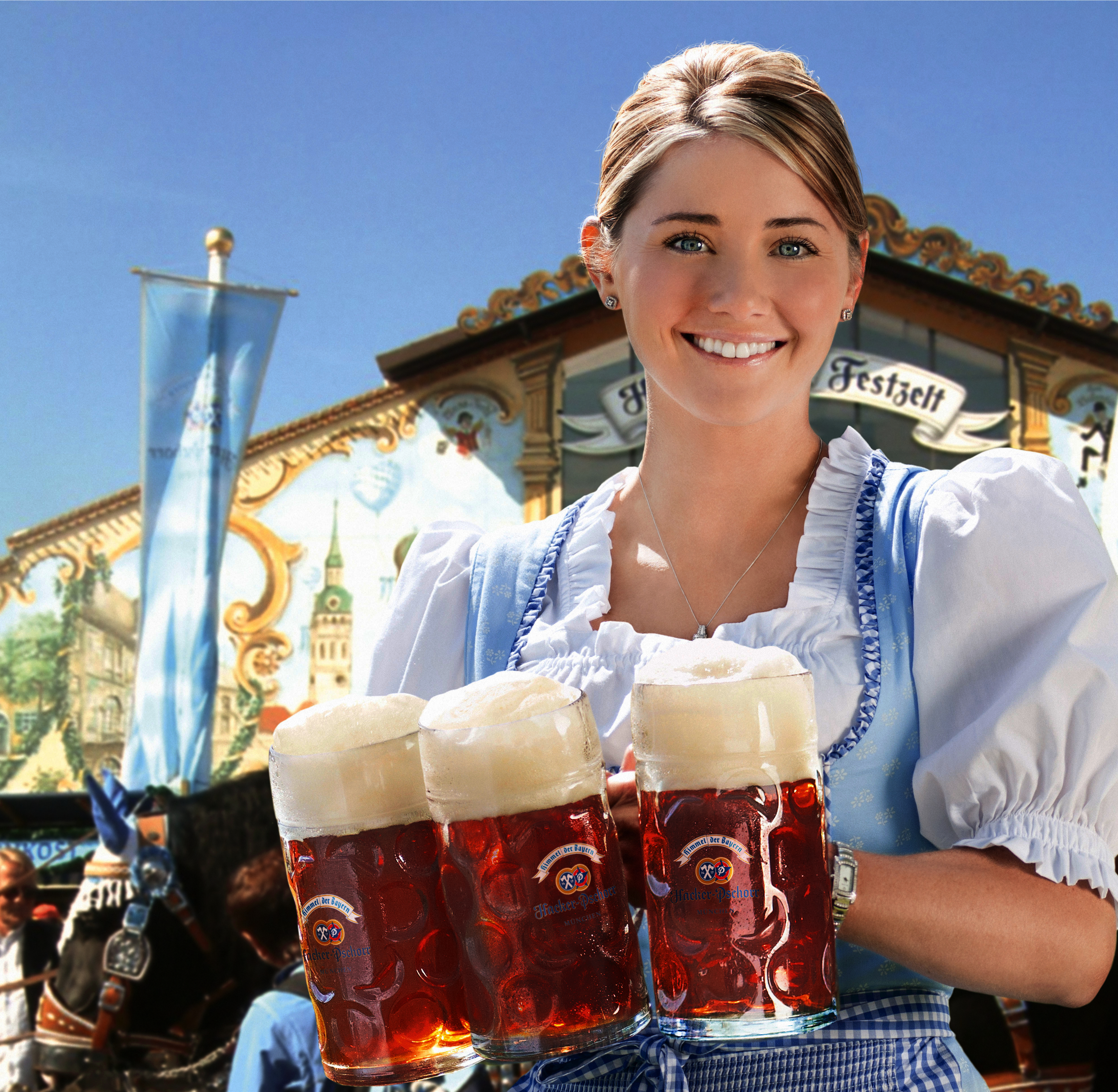
German woman with beer mugs at Oktoberfest.

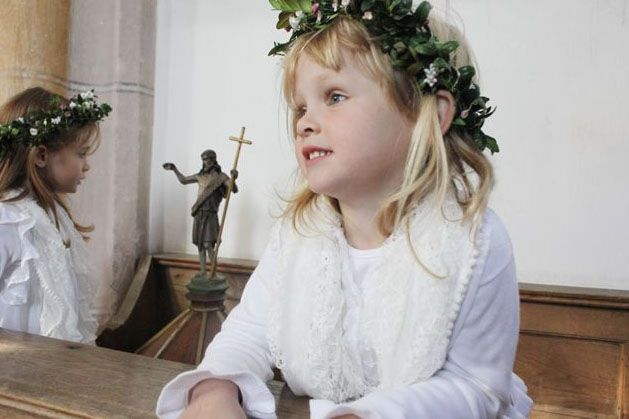
German girl at her Roman Catholic baptism in Bavaria, Germany.

The Germans are marked by great regional diversity, which makes identifying a single German culture quite difficult. The arts and sciences have for centuries been an important part of German identity. The Age of Enlightenment and the Romantic era saw a notable flourishing of German culture. Germans of this period who contributed significantly to the arts and sciences include the writers Johann Wolfgang von Goethe, Friedrich Schiller, Johann Gottfried Herder, Friedrich Hölderlin, E. T. A. Hoffmann, Heinrich Heine, Novalis and the Brothers Grimm, the philosopher Immanuel Kant, the architect Karl Friedrich Schinkel, the painter Caspar David Friedrich, and the composers Johann Sebastian Bach, Ludwig van Beethoven, Wolfgang Amadeus Mozart, Joseph Haydn, Johannes Brahms, Franz Schubert, Richard Strauss and Richard Wagner.

Popular German dishes include brown bread and stew. Germans consume a high amount of alcohol, particularly beer, compared to other European peoples. Obesity is relatively widespread among Germans.

Carnival (German: Karneval, Fasching, or Fastnacht) is an important part of German culture, particularly in Southern Germany and the Rhineland. An important German festival is the Oktoberfest.

A steadily shrinking majority of Germans are Christians. About a third are Roman Catholics, while one third adheres to Protestantism. Another third does not profess any religion. Christian holidays such as Christmas and Easter are celebrated by many Germans. The number of Muslims is growing. There is also a notable Jewish community, which was decimated in the Holocaust.

== Identity ==
A German ethnic identity began to emerge during the early medieval period. These peoples came to be referred to by the High German term diutisc, which means "ethnic" or "relating to the people". The German endonym Deutsche is derived from this word. In subsequent centuries, the German lands were relatively decentralized, leading to the maintenance of a number of strong regional identities.

The German nationalist movement emerged among German intellectuals in the late 18th century. They saw the Germans as a people united by language and advocated the unification of all Germans into a single nation state, which was partially achieved in 1871. By the late 19th and early 20th century, German identity came to be defined by a shared descent, culture, and history. Völkisch elements identified Germanness with "a shared Christian heritage" and "biological essence", to the exclusion of the notable Jewish minority. After the Holocaust and the downfall of Nazism, "any confident sense of Germanness had become suspect, if not impossible". East Germany and West Germany both sought to build up an identity on historical or ideological lines, distancing themselves both from the Nazi past and each other. After German reunification in 1990, the political discourse was characterized by the idea of a "shared, ethnoculturally defined Germanness", and the general climate became increasingly xenophobic during the 1990s. Today, discussion on Germanness may stress various aspects, such as commitment to pluralism and the German constitution (constitutional patriotism), or the notion of a Kulturnation (nation sharing a common culture). The German language remains the primary criterion of modern German identity.

== See also ==
- Anti-German sentiment – Opposition to Germany, its inhabitants and culture
- Demographics of Germany
- Die Deutschen – ZDF's documentary television series
- Ethnic groups in Europe
- German diaspora – German emigrants and their descendants
- Germanophile – Someone with a strong interest in or love of German people, culture, and history
