= List of monarchs of Germany =

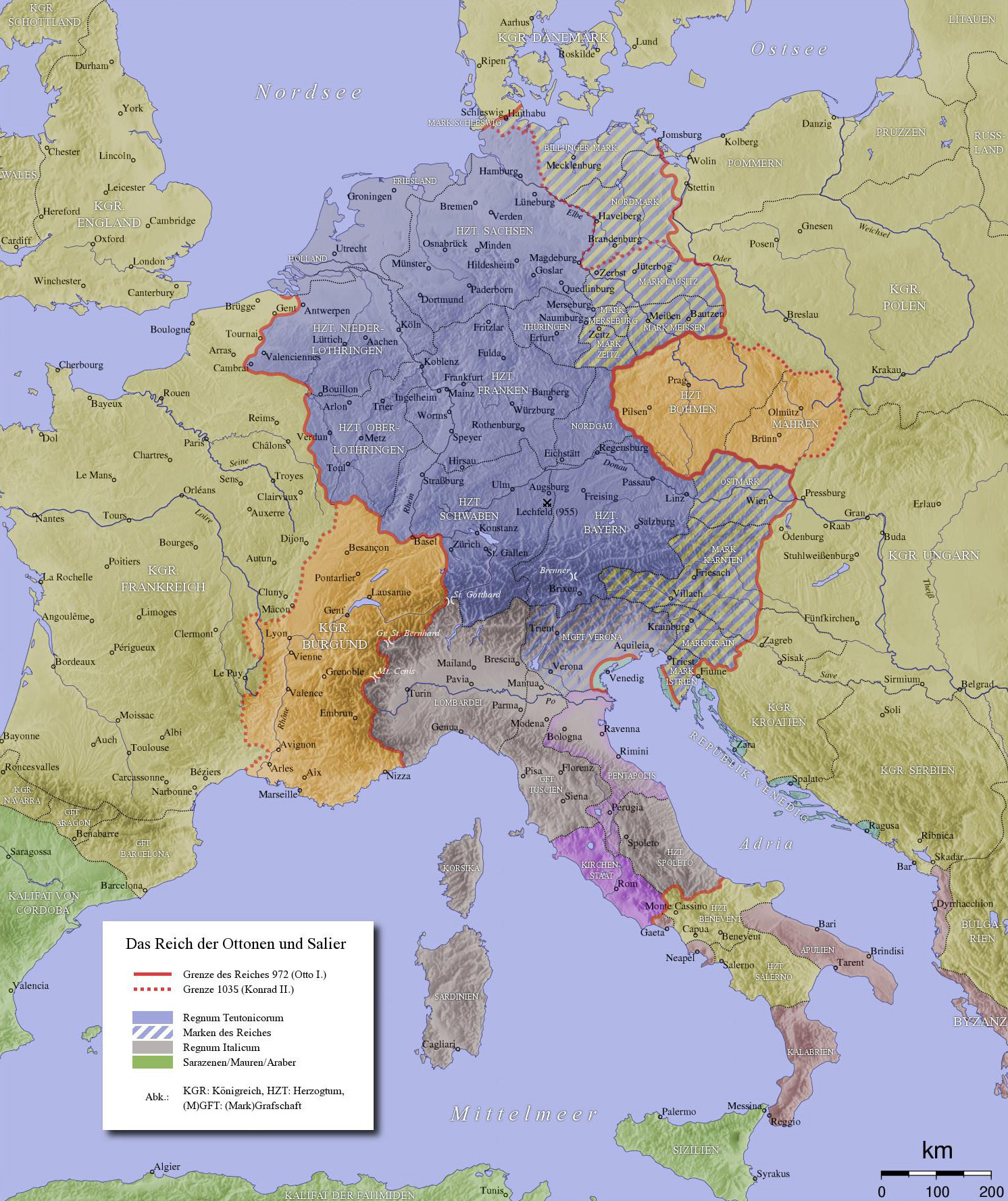
German kingdom (blue) in the Holy Roman Empire around 1000

This is a list of monarchs who ruled over East Francia, later known as the Kingdom of Germany (Latin: Regnum Teutonicum), from the division of the Frankish Empire in 843 and the collapse of the Holy Roman Empire in 1806 until the collapse of the German Empire in 1918.

== General notes ==
- The Frankish kingdom was split by the Treaty of Verdun in 843. The rulers of the eastern area thus called themselves rex Francorum ("king of the Franks"), rex Francorum orientalium ("king of the East Franks"), and later just rex. A reference to the "Germans", indicating the emergence of a German nation of some sort, did not appear until the late 11th century, when the pope began to refer to his enemy Henry IV as rex teutonicorum (another exonym for Germans) in order to brand him as a foreigner. The kings reacted by consistently using the title rex Romanorum, king of the Romans, to emphasize their universal rule even before becoming emperor. This title remained until the end of the Empire in 1806, though after 1508 emperors-elect added "king in Germany" to their titles. In this and related entries, the kings and are called kings of Germany for clarity's sake.
- The Kingdom of Germany was never entirely hereditary; rather, ancestry was only one of the factors that determined the succession of kings. During the 10th to 13th centuries, the king was formally elected by the leading nobility in the realm, continuing the Frankish tradition. Gradually the election became the privilege of a group of princes called electors, and the Golden Bull of 1356 formally defined election proceedings.
- In the Middle Ages, the king did not assume the title "emperor" (in full, Imperator Augustus Romanorum, Venerable Emperor of the Romans) until crowned by the pope. Moving to Italy, he was usually first crowned with the Iron Crown of Lombardy, after which he assumed the title of rex Italiae, king of Italy. After this, he would ride on to Rome and be crowned emperor by the pope.
- Regnal numbers were not formally adopted until the 12th century. Emperors beginning with Lothair III (r. 1133–1137), who was actually the second emperor of that name, abandoned any distinction in numbering between his rule as king and his rule as emperor. Both German and French monarchs saw themselves as the successors of Charlemagne, hence why he and Louis the Pious, both emperors, are enumerated as "Charles I" and "Louis I" in their regnal lists. (Note: These numbering arrangements are often arbitrary. The son of Emperor Lothair I is often called Lothair II, but the same number is applied to Lothair II, king of Italy. Emperor Charles V dopted his regnal number by counting all emperors named Charles, including Charles the Bald, who never ruled over Germany. Charles V of France, however, decided to exclude Charles the Fat because he was originally a German king, despite briefly ruling over France. Emperor Louis IV was the fourth emperor of that name, but was also the fifth German king named Louis. Some rulers even shared nicknames: the name "Louis the Younger" is simultaneously used for Emperor Louis II, king Louis of Saxony, and king Louis VII of France.)
- Maximilian I was the first king to bear the title of "emperor-elect" (Imperator electus). After his march to Rome for his Imperial coronation failed in 1508, he had himself proclaimed emperor-elect with papal consent. His successor Charles V also assumed that title after his coronation in 1520 until he was crowned emperor by the pope in 1530. From Ferdinand I onwards, all emperors did not get crowned by the Pope anymore. At the same time, chosen successors of the emperors held the title of king of the Romans, if elected by the college of electors during their predecessor's lifetime.
- The list is heavely intertwined with lists of Holy Roman Emperors and Austrian rulers until the 19th century. The German state of Prussia formally established Germany as a nation-state in 1871.

Emperors are listed in bold.

== East Francia (843–962) ==
=== Carolingian dynasty ===
| Portrait | Name | King | Emperor | Ended | Notes | Ref. |
|---|---|---|---|---|---|---|
| | Louis II "the German"; Ludwig | c. 10 August 843 | — | 28 August 876 | Son of Louis the Pious and grandson of Charlemagne. De jure subordinate king under emperors Lothair I (r. 840–855), Louis II (r. 855–875) and Charles II (r. 875–877). | |
| Non-contemporary | Carloman "the Bavarian"; Karlmann | 28 August 876 | — | November 879 | Son of Louis the German, ruled as king of Bavaria. Also became king of Italy after the death of Emperor Charles II, who ruled Italy and West Francia, in October 877. Abdicated the throne and died of an illness shortly after, on 20 March 880. | |
| Non-contemporary | Louis III "the Saxon"; Ludwig | 28 August 876 | — | 20 January 882 | Son of Louis the German, initially king of Saxony. Inherited Carloman's territories in Bavaria in November 879. | |
| | Charles III "the Fat"; Karl | 28 August 876 | 12 February 881 | c. 17 November 887 | Son of Louis the German, initially king of Alemannia, then crowned King of Italy (March 880) and Roman Emperor (February 881). Became sole king of East Francia in January 882, and also king of West Francia after the death of Carloman II in December 884, briefly reunited the Carolingian Empire before being deposed. | |
| | Arnulf; Arnulf | c. 27 November 887 | 25 April 896 | 8 December 899 | Illegitimate son of Carloman of Bavaria and Duke of Carinthia, took power after a coup against Charles the Fat. Also king of Italy. | |
| Non-contemporary | Louis IV "the Child"; Ludwig | 8 December 899 | — | 24 September 911 | Son of Arnulf of Carinthia; sometimes called "Louis III". | |

=== Conradine dynasty ===
| Portrait | Name | King | Emperor | Ended | Notes | Ref. |
|---|---|---|---|---|---|---|
| | Conrad I Konrad | 10 November 911 | — | 23 December 918 | Elected by the nobility | |

=== Ottonian dynasty ===
(§) – Rival king that never ruled unopposed

| Seal/Portrait | Name | King | Emperor | Ended | Notes | Ref. |
|---|---|---|---|---|---|---|
| | Henry I "the Fowler"; Heinrich | c. 12 May 919 | — | 2 July 936 | Elected by the nobility | |
| — | Arnulf "the Evil"; Arnulf | 919 | — | 921 | Rival king to Henry I, member of the Luitpoldings | |

== Holy Roman Empire (962–1806) ==
The title "King of the Romans", used in the Holy Roman Empire, denoted a ruler elected by the German princes whose authority was primarily exercised over the Germanic-speaking territories of the empire. While no formal “King of Germany” existed, the king’s election and governance effectively corresponded to that of a monarch over these lands. After election, the king would traditionally proceed to Rome to be crowned emperor by the pope.

=== Ottonian dynasty (continued) ===
| Portrait | Name | King | Emperor | Ended | Notes | Ref. |
|---|---|---|---|---|---|---|
| | Otto I "the Great" | 2 July 936 | 2 February 962 | 7 May 973 | Son of Henry I; first king crowned in Aachen Cathedral since Lothair I; crowned Holy Roman Emperor in 962 | |
| | Otto II "the Red" | 26 May 961 (co-king) | 25 December 967 (co-emperor); 7 May 973 (senior emperor) | 7 December 983 | Son of Otto I; first king and then emperor under his father. | |
| | Otto III | 25 December 983 | 21 May 996 | 21 January 1002 | Son of Otto II | |
| | Henry II "the Saint"; Heinrich | 7 June 1002 | 14 February 1014 | 13 July 1024 | Great-grandson of Henry I | |

=== Salian dynasty ===
(#) – Junior king
(§) – Rival king that never ruled unopposed

| Seal/Portrait | Name | King | Emperor | Ended | Notes | Ref. |
|---|---|---|---|---|---|---|
| | Conrad II "the Salic"; Konrad | 8 September 1024 | 26 March 1027 | 4 June 1039 | Great-great-grandson of Otto I | |
| | Henry III; Heinrich | 14 April 1028 | 25 December 1046 | 5 October 1056 | Son of Conrad II; junior king under his father 1028–1039; last German monarch to use the title of rex francorum | |
| | Henry IV; Heinrich | 17 July 1054 | 21 March 1084 | 31 December 1105 | Son of Henry III; junior king under his father, 1054–1056 | |
| | Rudolf of Rheinfelden | 15 March 1077 | — | 15 October 1080 | Rival king to Henry IV; member of the Rheinfeld. | |
| | Hermann of Salm | 6 August 1081 | — | 28 September 1088 | Rival king to Henry IV; member of the Salm family. | |
| | Conrad of Italy; Konrad | 30 May 1087 | — | 27 July 1101 | Son of Henry IV; King of Germany under his father, 1087–1098, King of Italy, 1093–1098, 1095–1101 in rebellion. | |
| | Henry V Heinrich | 6 January 1099 | 13 April 1111 | 23 May 1125 | Son of Henry IV; King of Germany under his father, 1099–1105, forced his father to abdicate | |

=== Supplinburger dynasty ===
| Seal/Portrait | Name | King | Emperor | Ended | Notes | Ref. |
|---|---|---|---|---|---|---|
| | Lothair III; Lothar III. | 13 September 1125 | 4 June 1133 | 4 December 1137 | Was Lothair II of Germany, but Lothair III of Italy. Gave rise to the Guelph faction, named after his heir and son-in-law Henry the Proud of the House of Welf | |

=== Hohenstaufen dynasty ===
(#) – Junior king

| Seal/Portrait | Name | King | Emperor | Ended | Notes | Ref. |
|---|---|---|---|---|---|---|
| | Conrad III; Konrad III. | 7 March 1138 | — | 15 February 1152 | Grandson of Henry IV (through his mother); Previously rival king to Lothair III 1127–1135 (Note: Elected anti-king at Nuremberg on 18 December 1127 and crowned on 29 June 1128; submitted to the emperor on 29 September 1135, in Mühlhausen, Thuringia.) | |
| | Henry Berengar; Heinrich (VI.) | 30 March 1147 | — | 1150 | Son of Conrad III; King of Germany under his father 1147–1150 | |
| | Frederick I "Barbarossa"; Friedrich I. | 4 March 1152 | 18 June 1155 | 10 June 1190 | Nephew of Conrad III | |
| | Henry VI (Heinrich VI.) | 15 August 1169 (as co-king) | 15 April 1191 | 28 September 1197 | Son of Frederick I; crowned co-king at the age of 3. | |
| | Frederick II; Friedrich II. | 1196 | — | 1198 | Son of Henry VI; King of Germany under his father 1196–1198 | |
| | Philip of Swabia; Philipp II. | 8 March 1198 | — | 21 June 1208 | Son of Frederick I; elected rival king to Otto IV; Called himself "Philip II," after the Roman emperor Philip the Arab. | |
| | Otto IV | 9 June 1198 | 21 October 1209 | 1215 | Great-grandson of Lothair III, member of the House of Welf; later opposed by Frederick II; deposed in 1215; died on 19 May 1218 | |
| | Frederick II; Friedrich II. | 5 December 1212 | 22 November 1220 | 26 December 1250 | Son of Henry VI; Rival king to Otto IV until 5 July 1215 | |
| | Henry (VII); Heinrich (VII.) | 23 April 1220 | — | 4 July 1235 | Son of Frederick II; crowned co-king at the age of 10 | |
| | Conrad IV (Konrad IV.) | February 1237 | — | 21 May 1254 | Son of Frederick II; King of Germany under his father, 1237–1250 | |

=== Interregnum ===
(§) – Rival king that never ruled unopposed

| Image | Coat of arms | Name | House | King | Emperor | Ended | Notes | Ref. |
|---|---|---|---|---|---|---|---|---|
| | | Henry Raspe; Heinrich Raspe | Ludovingians | 22 May 1246 | — | 16 February 1247 | Rival King to Frederick II and great-great-great-grandson of Henry IV | |
| | | William of Holland; Wilhelm | Holland | 3 October 1247 | — | 28 January 1256 | Rival King to Frederick II and Conrad IV 1247–1254; unopposed 1254-1256 Married Elisabeth of the House of Welf in January 1252 to gain support of the Guelph faction | |
| | | Richard of Cornwall | Plantagenet | 13 January 1257 | — | 2 April 1272 | Brother-in-law of Frederick II and first-cousin of Otto IV, held little real authority (Note: He was crowned in Aachen Cathedral by the Archbishop of Cologne in 1257, campaigned in the Rhineland with his German allies to liberate the elector of Cologne, organised the Diet of Worms of 1269 and married in the same year in Kaiserslautern with Beatrice of Falkenburg, but only resided in Germany in 1257, 1258, 1260, 1262, 1263, 1268 and 1269. He remained in England during the Second Barons' War in support of his brother and spent a period during the years 1264 and 1265 in the captivity of the English barons. The remainder of his reign he resided in England.) Supported by the Guelph faction | |
| | | Alfonso X of Castile | Ivrea | 1 April 1257 | 21 August 1257 (self-proclaimed) | 1275 | Grandson of Philip of Swabia; rival king to Richard of Cornwall; he held no authority and never went to Germany Supported by the Ghibelline faction, but lost their support when he was opposed by Rudolf I in 1273 Relinquished claims in 1275 | |

=== Changing dynasties ===
(#) – Junior king
(§) – Rival king that never ruled unopposed

| Image | Coat of arms | Name | House | King | Emperor | Ended | Notes | Ref. |
|---|---|---|---|---|---|---|---|---|
| | | Rudolf I | Habsburg | 1 October 1273 | — | 15 July 1291 | First of the Habsburgs | |
| | | Adolf | Nassau | 5 May 1292 | — | 23 June 1298 | According to some historians, Adolf's election was preceded by the short-lived kingship of Conrad, Duke of Teck. See his article for details. | |
| | | Albert I Albrecht I. | Habsburg | 27 July 1298 | — | 1 May 1308 | Son of Rudolf I; Rival king to Adolf of Nassau, 1298 | |
| | | Henry VII; Heinrich VII. | Luxembourg | 27 November 1308 | 29 June 1312 | 24 August 1313 | First emperor since the death of Frederick II in 1250. | |
| | | Louis IV "the Bavarian"; Ludwig IV. | Wittelsbach | 20 October 1314 | 17 January 1328 | 11 October 1347 | Grandson of Rudolf I; rival king to Frederick the Fair, 1314–1322 | |
| | | Frederick "the Fair"; Friedrich | Habsburg | 19 October 1314/ 5 September 1325 | — | 28 September 1322/ 13 January 1330 | Son of Albert I; rival king to Louis IV, 1314–1322; associate king with Louis IV, 1325–1330 | |
| | | Charles IV Wenceslaus; Karl IV. | Luxembourg | 11 July 1346 | 5 April 1355 (Note: He was crowned King of Italy on 6 January 1355.) | 29 November 1378 | Grandson of Henry VII; rival king to Louis IV, 1346–1347; also King of Bohemia, King of Italy and Holy Roman Emperor | |
| | | Günther | Schwarzburg | 30 January 1349 | — | 26 May 1349 | Rival king to Charles IV | |
| | | Wenceslaus of Bohemia; Wenzel | Luxembourg | 10 June 1376 (junior king); 29 November 1378 (senior king) | — | 20 August 1400 | Son of Charles IV; king of Germany under his father 1376–1378; deposed 1400; also by inheritance King of Bohemia; died 1419 | |
| | | Rupert of the Palatinate; Ruprecht | Wittelsbach | 21 August 1400 | — | 18 May 1410 | Great-grandnephew of Louis IV | |
| | | Sigismund | Luxembourg | 20 September 1410 | 31 May 1433 | 9 December 1437 | Son of Charles IV. Also King of Bohemia-Croatia and prince-elector of Brandenburg. | |
| | | Jobst of Moravia | Luxembourg | 1 October 1410 | — | 8 January 1411 | Nephew of Charles IV; elected rival king to Sigismund | |

=== Habsburg dynasty ===
| Image | Coat of arms | Name | King | Emperor | Ended | Notes | Ref. |
|---|---|---|---|---|---|---|---|
| | | Albert II; Albrecht II. | 18 March 1438 | — | 27 October 1439 | 4th in descent from Albert I; son-in-law of Sigismund. Also Duke of Austria | |
| | | Frederick III; Friedrich III. | 2 February 1440 | 19 March 1452 | 19 August 1493 | 4th in descent from Albert I; 2nd cousin of Albert II. His 53-year reign was the longest of any German monarch. Also ruled as duke of Inner Austria since 1424, amounting to a total reign of 69 years. | |
| | | Maximilian I | 16 February 1486 | 4 February 1508 | 12 January 1519 | Son of Frederick III; King of Germany under his father, 1486–1493; assumed the title "Elected Emperor" in 1508 with the pope's approval | |
| | | Charles V Karl V. | 28 June 1519 | | 3 August 1556 (Note: Charles abdicated several times between 1555 and 1558. His first abdication was on 3 August 1556. On 27 August, Charles wrote a document to the Imperial court in Speyer (referred to as a Constitutio or Rescriptum) renouncing the Empire in favour of Ferdinand. Immediately before departing for Spain, on 7 September, he sent an edict to all States of the Empire, urging them to recognise Ferdinand as their new ruler. The official transfer of power happened on 14 March 1558.) | Grandson of Maximilian I; was also King of Spain, Archduke of Austria, and ruler of several other territories. Reigned over a massive empire, but abdicated and divided his realm before his death on 21 September 1558. Last Emperor to receive the imperial coronation from the Pope. | |
| | | Ferdinand I | 5 January 1531 (under Charles V) | 3 August 1556 (de facto); 14 March 1558 (de jure) | 25 July 1564 | Grandson of Maximilian I; brother of Charles V; King of Germany under his brother Charles V 1531–1556; last king to be crowned in Aachen Cathedral. | |
| | | Maximilian II | 30 November 1562 (under Ferdinand I) | 25 July 1564 | 12 October 1576 | Son of Ferdinand I; King of Germany under his father 1562–1564 | |
| | | Rudolf II | 27 October 1575 (under Maximilian II) | 12 October 1576 | 20 January 1612 | Son of Maximilian II; King of Germany under his father, 1575–1576 | |
| | | Matthias | 13 June 1612 | | 20 March 1619 | Son of Maximilian II | |
| | | Ferdinand II | 28 August 1619 | | 15 February 1637 | Grandson of Ferdinand I | |
| | | Ferdinand III | 22 December 1636 | 15 February 1637 | 2 April 1657 | Son of Ferdinand II; King of Germany under his father 1636–1637 | |
| | | Ferdinand IV | 31 May 1653 (under Ferdinand III) | — | 9 July 1654 | Son of Ferdinand III; King of Germany under his father | |
| | | Leopold I | 18 July 1658 | | 5 May 1705 | Son of Ferdinand III; elected after an interregnum of 17 months. | |
| | | Joseph I | 23 January 1690 (under Leopold I) | 5 May 1705 | 17 April 1711 | Son of Leopold I; King of Germany under his father 1690–1705 | |
| | | Charles VI; Karl VI. | 12 October 1711 | | 20 October 1740 | Son of Leopold I; also claimed the throne of Spain | |
| | | Charles VII; Karl VII. | 24 January 1742 | | 20 January 1745 | Member of the House of Wittelsbach. Great-great-grandson of Ferdinand II; Husband of Maria Amalia, daughter of Joseph I | |
| | | Francis I Franz I. | 13 September 1745 | | 18 August 1765 | Husband of Maria Theresa. Member of the House of Lorraine. | |
| | | Joseph II | 27 March 1764 (under Francis I) | 18 August 1765 | 20 February 1790 | Son of Maria Theresa and Francis I; King of Germany under his mother and father 1764–1765 | |
| | | Leopold II | 30 September 1790 | | 1 March 1792 | Son of Maria Theresa and Francis I | |
| | | Francis II; Franz II. | 5 July 1792 | | 6 August 1806 | Son of Leopold II; also Emperor of Austria 1804–1835 as Francis I and later President of the German Confederation 1815–1835; died 1835 | |

== Modern Germany (1806–1918) ==
Following the collapse of the Holy Roman Empire, modern-day Germany was reorganized into the Confederation of the Rhine and later the German Confederation. In 1871, Prussia ended the unification of Germany, excluding the Habsburg monarchy from the process. For earlier rulers of Prussia, see List of Prussian monarchs.

=== Confederation of the Rhine (1806–1813) ===
| Name | Portrait | Title | House | Began | Ended | Ref. |
|---|---|---|---|---|---|---|
| Napoleon Bonaparte, Emperor of the French; King of Italy | | Protector of the Confederation of the Rhine | Bonaparte | 12 July 1806 | 19 October 1813 | |
| Karl Theodor von Dalberg, Prince-Archbishop of Regensburg; Grand Duke of Frankfurt | | Prince-primate of the Confederation of the Rhine | Dalberg | 12 July 1806 | 19 October 1813 | |

=== German Confederation (1815–1866) ===
| Name | Portrait | Title | House | Began | Ended | Ref. |
|---|---|---|---|---|---|---|
| Francis I, Emperor of Austria (Franz I., Kaiser von Österreich) | | Head of the presiding power (Präsidialmacht) Austria | Habsburg-Lorraine | 20 June 1815 | 2 March 1835 | |
| Ferdinand I, Emperor of Austria (Ferdinand I., Kaiser von Österreich) | | Head of the presiding power (Präsidialmacht) Austria | Habsburg-Lorraine | 2 March 1835 | 12 July 1848 | |
| Archduke John of Austria (Erzherzog Johann von Österreich) | | Regent (Reichsverweser) of the revolutionary German Empire | Habsburg-Lorraine | 12 July 1848 | 20 December 1849 | |
| Frederick William IV, King of Prussia (Friedrich Wilhelm IV., König von Preußen) | | Emperor-elect of the Germans (unrecognized by himself) | Hohenzollern | 28 March 1849 | 28 April 1849 | |
| Frederick William IV, King of Prussia (Friedrich Wilhelm IV., König von Preußen) | | Presidium of the Union (Unionsvorstand) of the Erfurt Union | Hohenzollern | 26 May 1849 | 29 November 1850 | |
| Francis Joseph I, Emperor of Austria (Franz Joseph I., Kaiser von Österreich) | | Head of the presiding power (Präsidialmacht) Austria | Habsburg-Lorraine | 29 November 1850 | 23 August 1866 | |

=== North German Confederation (1866–1871) ===
| Name | Portrait | Title | House | Began | Ended |
|---|---|---|---|---|---|
| Wilhelm I, King of Prussia (Wilhelm I, König von Preußen) | | Holder of the Bundespräsidium of the North German Confederation | Hohenzollern | 18 August 1866 | 1 January 1871 |

=== German Empire (1871–1918) ===
| Name | Portrait | House | Term began | Term ended |
|---|---|---|---|---|
| Wilhelm I Wilhelm Friedrich Ludwig | | Hohenzollern | 1 January 1871 | 9 March 1888 |
| Friedrich III; Friedrich Wilhelm Nikolaus Karl | | Hohenzollern | 9 March 1888 | 15 June 1888 |
| Wilhelm II; Friedrich Wilhelm Viktor Albert | | Hohenzollern | 15 June 1888 | 9 November 1918 (Note: His abdication was announced by the Chancellor on 9 November, the same day in which the Republic was proclaimed. However, he did not formally abdicate until 28 November.) |

== See also ==
- Family tree of German monarchs
- Monarchy of Germany (1871–1918)
  - German Emperor
- List of German monarchs in 1918
- List of German queens
- Emperor of Austria
  - List of rulers of Austria
- King of Bavaria
  - List of rulers of Bavaria
- List of Prussian monarchs
- List of rulers of Saxony
- List of monarchs of Württemberg
