= Dresden Conference =

The Dresden Conference or the Conference of Dresden may refer to:

- Conference of Dresden (1812), a gathering of European leaders called by Napoleon to prepare for the French Invasion of Russia
- Dresden Conference (1851), a conference that affirmed Prussian recognition of the German Confederation
