= 1812 in Germany =

- Decades: 1800s; 1810s; 1820s; 1830s
- See also: Other events of 1812; History of Germany • Timeline • Years

Events from the year 1812 in Germany.

== Incumbents ==
=== Kingdoms ===
- Kingdom of Prussia
  - Monarch – Frederick William III (16 November 1797 – 7 June 1840)
- Kingdom of Bavaria
  - Maximilian I (1 January 1806 – 13 October 1825)
- Kingdom of Saxony
  - Frederick Augustus I (20 December 1806 – 5 May 1827)
- Kingdom of Württemberg
  - Frederick I (22 December 1797 – 30 October 1816)

=== Grand Duchies ===
- Grand Duke of Baden
  - Charles 10 June 1811 – 8 December 1818
- Grand Duke of Hesse
  - Louis I (14 August 1806 – 6 April 1830)
- Grand Duke of Mecklenburg-Schwerin
  - Frederick Francis I– (24 April 1785 – 1 February 1837)
- Grand Duke of Mecklenburg-Strelitz
  - Charles II (2 June 1794 – 6 November 1816)
- Grand Duke of Oldenburg
  - Wilhelm (6 July 1785 –2 July 1823 ) Due to mental illness, Wilhelm was duke in name only, with his cousin Peter, Prince-Bishop of Lübeck, acting as regent throughout his entire reign.
  - Peter I (2 July 1823 - 21 May 1829)
- Grand Duke of Saxe-Weimar-Eisenach
  - Karl August (1809–1815)

=== Principalities ===
- Schaumburg-Lippe
  - George William (13 February 1787 - 1860)
- Schwarzburg-Rudolstadt
  - Friedrich Günther (28 April 1807 - 28 June 1867)
- Schwarzburg-Sondershausen
  - Günther Friedrich Karl I (14 October 1794 - 19 August 1835)
- Principality of Lippe
  - Leopold II (5 November 1802 - 1 January 1851)
- Principality of Reuss-Greiz
  - Heinrich XIII (28 June 1800-29 January 1817)
- Waldeck and Pyrmont
  - Friedrich Karl August (29 August 1763 – 24 September 1812)
  - George I (24 September 1812 – 9 September 1813)

=== Duchies ===
- Duke of Anhalt-Dessau
  - Leopold III (16 December 1751 – 9 August 1817)
- Duke of Brunswick
  - Frederick William (16 October 1806 – 16 June 1815)
- Duke of Saxe-Altenburg
  - Duke of Saxe-Hildburghausen (1780–1826) - Frederick
- Duke of Saxe-Coburg and Gotha
  - Ernest I (9 December 1806 – 12 November 1826)
- Duke of Saxe-Meiningen
  - Bernhard II (24 December 1803–20 September 1866)
- Duke of Schleswig-Holstein-Sonderburg-Beck
  - Frederick Charles Louis (24 February 1775 – 25 March 1816)

== Events ==
- 20 February – Weber and his friend, clarinettist Heinrich Baermann, stay overnight in Berlin with the family of Baermann's former teacher Joseph Beer (father of Giacomo Meyerbeer).
- May – Conference of Dresden
- 2 July – Ludwig van Beethoven visits his patron Prince Kinsky, seeking an advance on his promised remuneration.
- 20 December – The first volume of Grimms' Fairy Tales is published in Germany.
- 31 December – Giacomo Meyerbeer becomes the toast of Munich after performing at a concert for the benefit of wounded Bavarian soldiers.
- The original Breidenbacher Hof hotel in Düsseldorf, Germany, opens to the public. (It is destroyed by bombing in 1943 and later rebuilt at a different location.)

== Births ==
- 6 February – Berthold Damcke, German composer (d. 1875)
- 27 April – Friedrich von Flotow, German composer (d. 1883)
- 14 May – Emilie Mayer, German composer (d. 1883)
- 9 June – Johann Gottfried Galle, German astronomer (d. 1910)
- 24 December – Karl Eduard Zachariae von Lingenthal, German jurist (d. 1894)
- 28 December – Julius Rietz, German cellist, conductor and composer (d. 1877)

== Deaths ==
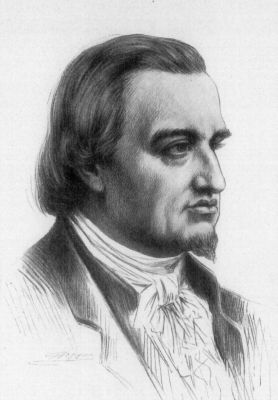
Mayer Amschel Rothschild

- 24 March – Johann Jakob Griesbach, German Biblical commentator (born 1745)
- 29 March – Johann Friedrich Dryander, German-born portrait painter (born 1756)
- 14 July – Christian Gottlob Heyne, German librarian and classicist (born 1729)*16 June – Franz Pforr, German Nazarene movement painter (born 1788)
- 10 July – Carl Ludwig Willdenow, German botanist (born 1765)
- 23 August – Tethart Philipp Christian Haag, German-born Dutch portrait artist (born 1737)
- 19 September – Mayer Amschel Rothschild, German banker (b. 1744)
- 21 September – Emanuel Schikaneder, German dramatist, actor and singer (b. 1751)
