= Punctation of Olmütz =

1850 treaty between Austria and Prussia

The Punctation of Olmütz (German: Olmützer Punktation), also called the Agreement of Olmütz, was a treaty between Prussia and Austria, dated 29 November 1850, by which Prussia abandoned the Erfurt Union and accepted the revival of the German Confederation under Austrian leadership. The treaty concluded the Autumn Crisis of 1850 in Germany.

The treaty was the result of a conference held in Olmütz in the Austrian Margraviate of Moravia (now Olomouc, Czech Republic). It is also known as the "humiliation of Olmütz", as the treaty was seen by many as a capitulation of the Prussians to the Austrians.

The reason for the treaty was a conflict between Prussia and Austria about the leadership in the German Confederation. The confederation, dominated by Austria, had been dissolved in the Revolutions of 1848 and partially succeeded by the Frankfurt Assembly. After the Frankfurt Assembly failed, Prussia, in early 1850, took the initiative of the Erfurt Union, a Prussia-led federation of most of the German states.

A conflict between the Elector of Hesse and his subjects was the cause for the Austrian chancellor Felix zu Schwarzenberg to isolate Prussia further. Austrian and allied armies advanced into the Electorate of Hesse. On 8 November 1850, the Prussian army had come close to war with Bavaria, an ally of Austria, near Fulda-Bronnzell.

Prussia then decided to give in, partly because Tsar Nicholas I of Russia had chosen the side of Austria in the Warsaw negotiations in October 1850. Prussia gave up its claim for the leadership of the German states. At the same time, the German Confederation was restored. Prussia submitted to Austrian leadership of the confederation, agreed to demobilise and to partake in the intervention of the German Diet in Hesse and Holstein and renounced any resumption of the Erfurt Union. On the other hand, Austria agreed to call for a ministerial conference to discuss a reform of the German Confederation, which took place in Dresden the following year without result.

== See also ==
- List of treaties

== Sources ==
- A. J. P. Taylor. The Course of German History: A Survey of the Development of Germany since 1815. Routledge, 1988 (1945). OCLC 59199248.
