= Conference of Dresden (1812) =

1812 international conference

The Conference of Dresden was a May 1812 gathering of European leaders arranged by Napoleon I of France as part of his preparations for the invasion of Russia. It was intended as a demonstration of his power and to seek military assistance for his campaign and began upon Napoleon's arrival in the Saxon capital on 16 May. Attendees included at least one emperor, six kings and numerous princes, grand duke, dukes and field marshals. Elaborate banquets, concerts and theatrical performances were laid on at the expense of the French state though Napoleon was largely pre-occupied with final planning for the invasion. Whilst at the conference Napoleon sent General Narbonne to meet with Alexander I of Russia with his final ultimatum. Alexander refused to make the territorial concessions demanded and stated that he would prefer to fight rather than agree to a "disgraceful peace". On 29 May, the day after receiving Alexander's reply, Napoleon left Dresden to lead the Grande Armée into Russia. The conference has been cited as a factor in the United States' commencement of the War of 1812 against Britain and the first indication of Napoleon's desire to wage war upon Russia since the signing of the 1807 Treaties of Tilsit.

== Conference ==
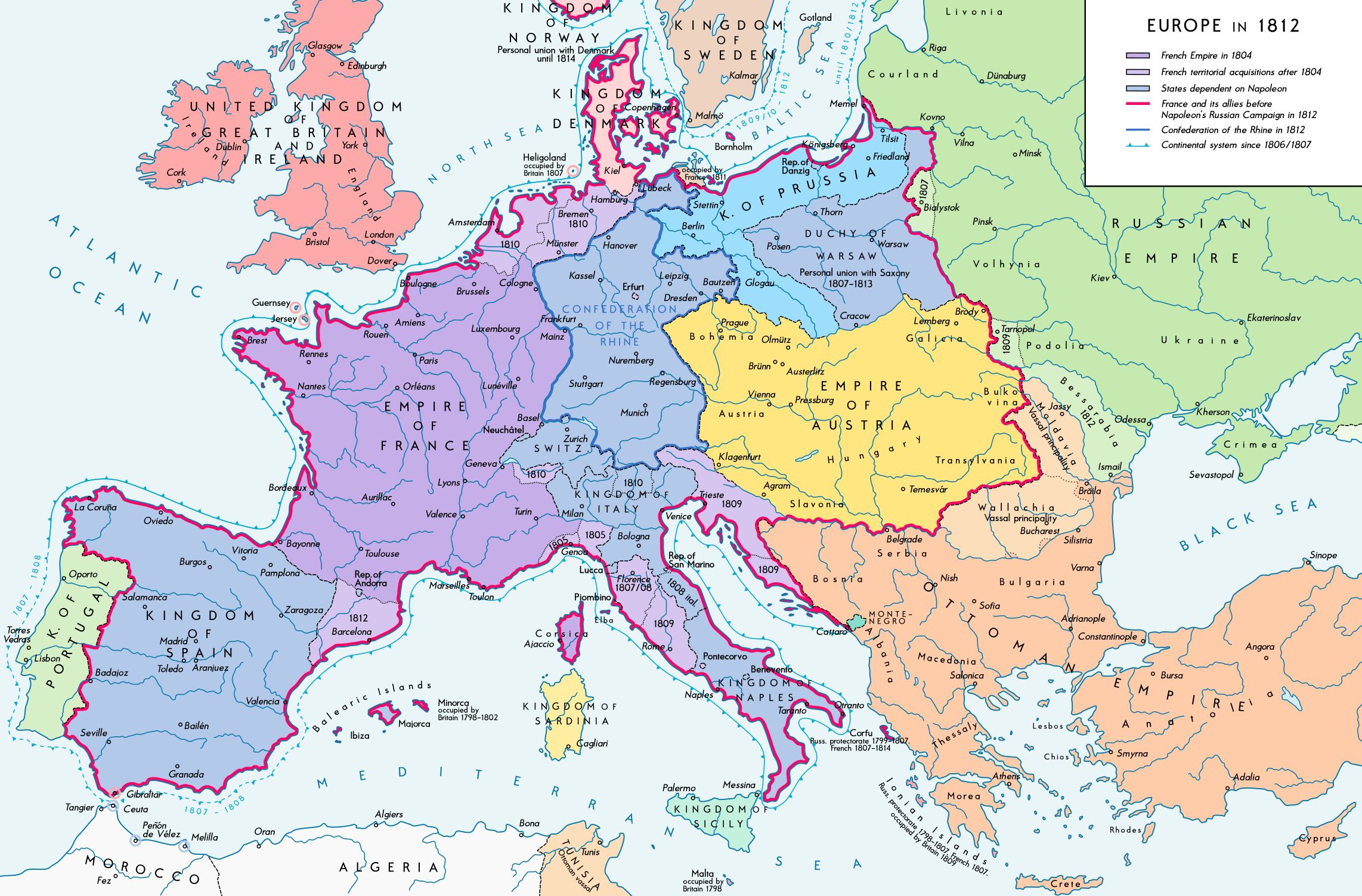
Europe in 1812. Napoleon's empire and dependencies in blue, Austria in yellow and Russia in green

Napoleon arrived in Dresden on 16 May 1812 from Saint-Cloud, France. He was accompanied by more than three hundred carriages, recently commissioned in Paris, and a considerable number of carts carrying silver plate, tapestries and other luxuries. He was accompanied by his empress, Marie Louise and her maids of honour. Napoleon's empire was at its greatest extent and he held dominion over most of the sovereigns of Western continental Europe. Napoleon arranged a gathering of the kings and princes of Germany to demonstrate his power and gather support for his planned invasion of Russia. A series of banquets, fetes and concerts were held and plays were put on by actors brought from the finest theatre companies of Paris all funded by the French emperor. The conference was so grand it was compared to the gatherings of the Grand Mughals.

The conference was attended by Emperor Francis I of Austria; King Frederick William III of Prussia and King Frederick Augustus I of Saxony – all recent allies of Napoleon. Also attending were King Maximilian I Joseph of Bavaria; King Frederick I of Württemberg; King Jérôme Bonaparte of Westphalia; Joachim Murat, King of Naples together with almost all the princes of the smaller German states, grand dukes, dukes, field marshals and Marshals of the Empire. It was said that fear and hatred of Napoleon guaranteed many of the attendees' loyalties, as much as admiration and friendship and that more than half of those attending would rather wish that Napoleon were dead. Napoleon's time was largely taken up by meetings to finalise the preparations for war and, though he was the principal attraction of the conference, for much of the time the assembled monarchs were deprived of his presence.

Napoleon reviewed an army comprising 500,000 men and 1,200 guns from France and the numerous allied states which would form his invasion force. Despite the obvious preparations and gathering together of men and materiel (including 100,000 ammunition wagons) Napoleon sought to keep his ambitions secret, issuing orders to his officers that they were not to discuss their potential opponents. It was even rumoured that he intended to join Russia in a war against the Ottoman Empire. The rulers of the German-speaking peoples assured the French emperor of their military support with Francis I stating that Napoleon could "fully rely upon Austria for the triumph of the common cause" and Frederick William III swearing his "unswerving fidelity".

== Communications with the Tsar ==
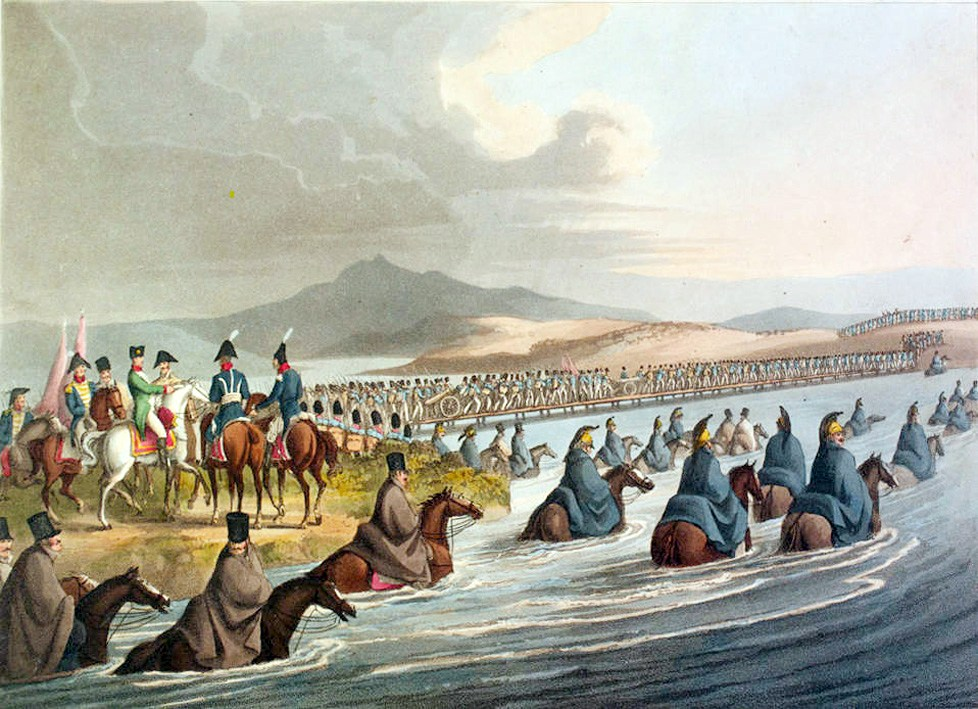
Napoleon's army crossing the Neman, by John Heaviside Clark

During the conference Napoleon heard of Russian Tsar Alexander I's arrival at Vilna (modern Lithuania) and sent General Narbonne with an ultimatum. Napoleon desired the ceding of lands to Prussia in compensation for those lost in previous wars and the creation of independent dukedoms from the Russian territories of Smolensk and of St Petersburg with Alexander reduced to ruling Asian Russia. Alexander showed Narbonne a map of Russia, demonstrating its vastness and stated that he would not commence hostilities but would fight if attacked and, if necessary, would withdraw his troops to the far eastern Kamchatka Peninsula rather than surrender. Narbonne returned on 28 May with Alexander's rejection of the demands and a statement that Russia preferred war to a "disgraceful peace". Narbonne stated that he believed it would be best to agree to a short term of peace and to rest the French army at Warsaw for the winter. Napoleon was of the opinion that he now had no choice but to open hostilities stating "the bottle is opened – the wine must be drunk" and left the next day for the Neman river to commence his invasion.

== Legacy ==
The power and reach that Napoleon demonstrated at Dresden may have helped persuade the American government of the advantages of entering into a war with Britain. The War of 1812 was declared in June of that year. Prior to the conference Napoleon had maintained a mask of friendship towards Russia and it was the first time that his intentions towards that country became apparent.
