= Dresden Conference (1851) =

1851 conference that affirmed Prussian recognition of the German Confederation

The Dresden Conference (December 23, 1850 to May 16, 1851) took place at Dresden, Kingdom of Saxony, after the Prussian humiliation at the Punctation of Olmütz. It was a largely fruitless exercise to settle the constitutional problems of Germany, but reaffirmed Prussian recognition of the German Confederation and resulted in Prussia signing a secret alliance with the Austrian Empire to assist each other in case of attacks on the German Confederation or either of their empires.
