= Germany. A Winter's Tale =

Epic poem by Heinrich Heine

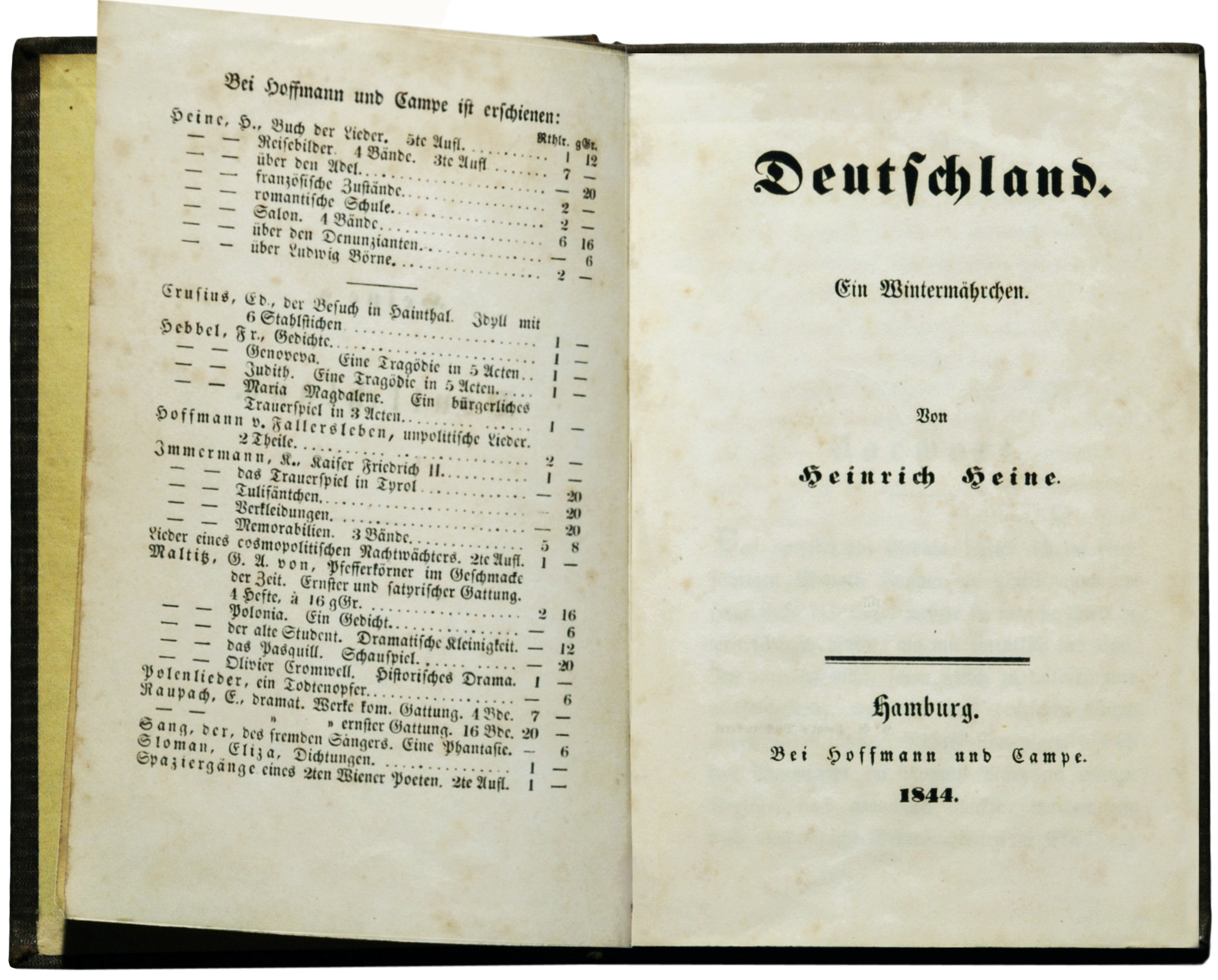
First edition, published in 1844

Germany. A Winter's Tale (German: Deutschland. Ein Wintermärchen) is a satirical epic poem by the German writer Heinrich Heine (1797–1856), describing the thoughts of a journey from Paris to Hamburg the author made in winter 1843. The title refers to Shakespeare's Winter's Tale, similar to his poem Atta Troll: Ein Sommernachtstraum ("Atta Troll: A Midsummer Night's Dream"), written 1841–46.

This poem was immediately banned in the Austrian Empire and in most of the German Confederation, which ironically became one of the reasons for Heine's growing fame.

== Original publication ==
From the onset of the (Metternich) Restoration in Germany, Heine was no longer secure from the censorship, and in 1831 he finally migrated to France as an exile. In 1835 a decree of the German Federal Convention banned his writings together with the publications of the Young Germany literary group.

At the end of 1843 Heine went back to Germany for a few weeks to visit his mother and his publisher Julius Campe in Hamburg. On the return journey the first draft of Deutschland. Ein Wintermärchen took shape. The verse epic appeared in 1844 published by Hoffmann and Campe, Hamburg. According to the censorship regulations of the 1819 Carlsbad Decrees, manuscripts of more than twenty folios did not fall under the scrutiny of the censor. Therefore, Deutschland. Ein Wintermärchen was published together with other poems in a volume called ‘New Poems’. However, on 4 October 1844 the book was banned and the stock confiscated in Prussia. On 12 December 1844, King Frederick William IV issued a warrant of arrest against Heine. In the period following the work was repeatedly banned by the censorship authorities. In other parts of Germany it was certainly issued in the form of a separate publication, also published by Hoffmann and Campe, but Heine had to shorten and rewrite it.

Ironically, censorship of Heine's works, particularly of the Winter Tale, became a major reason for Heine's raising fame.

== Contents ==
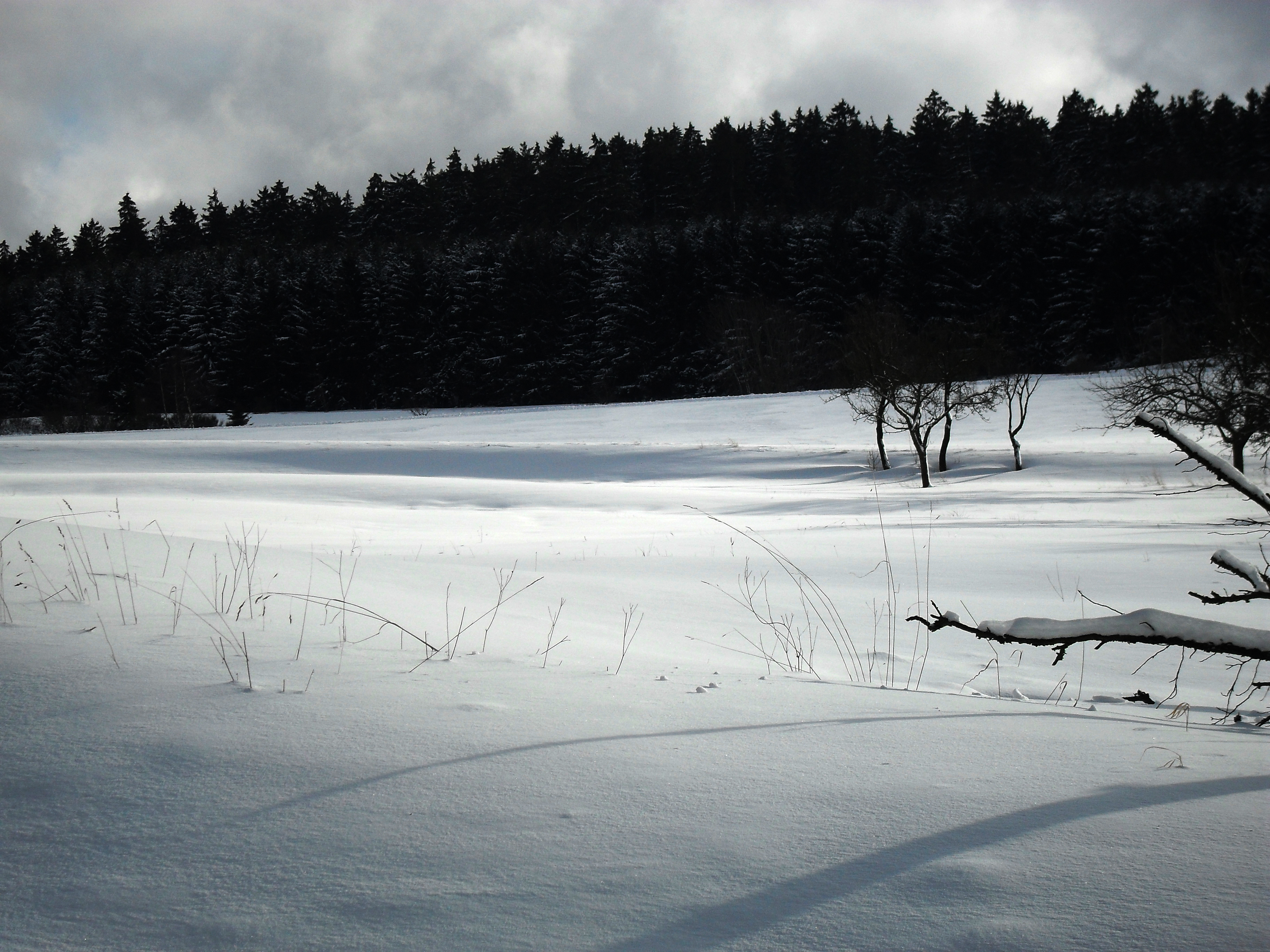
Winter landscape near Schmitten, Hesse

The opening of the poem is the first journey of Heinrich Heine to Germany since his emigration to France in 1831. However it is to be understood that this is an imaginary journey, not the actual journey which Heine made but a literary tour through various provinces of Germany for the purposes of his commentary. The 'I' of the narrative is therefore the instrument of the poet's creative imagination.

Wintermärchen and Winterreise
Heinrich Heine was a master of the natural style of lyrics on the theme of love, like those in the 'Lyrisches Intermezzo' of 1822-1823 in Das Buch der Lieder (1827) which were set by Robert Schumann in his Dichterliebe. A few of his poems had been set by Franz Schubert, not least for the great posthumously-collected series of songs known as the Schwanengesang. In such works Heine assumed the manner of Wilhelm Müller, whose son Professor Max Müller later emphasized the fundamentally musical nature of these poems and the absolute congruity of Schubert's settings of them, which are fully composed duos for voice and piano rather than merely 'accompaniments' to tunes. Yet Heine's work addressed political preoccupations with a barbed and contemporary voice, whereas Müller's melancholy lyricism and nature-scenery explored more private (if equally universal) human experience. Schubert's Heine settings hardly portray the poet-philosopher's full identity.

Schubert was dead by 1828: Heine's choice of the winter journey theme certainly alludes to the Winterreise, Müller's cycle of poems about lost love, which in Schubert's song-cycle of the same name became an immortal work embodying some more final and tragic statement about the human condition. Winterreise is about the exile of the human heart, and its bitter and gloomy self-reconciliation. Deutschland. Ein Wintermärchen transfers the theme to the international European political scene, his exile as a writer from his own homeland (where his heart is), and his Heimatssehnsucht or longing for the homeland. Thus Heine casts his secret and 'illegal thoughts', so that the darts of his satire and humour fly out from the tragic vortex of his own exile. The fact that Heine's poetry was itself so closely identified with Schubert was part of his armoury of 'fire and weapons' mentioned in the closing stanzas: he transformed Müller's lament into a lament for Germany.

In Section III, full of euphoria he sets foot again on German soil, with only ‘shirts, trousers and pocket handkerchiefs’ in his luggage, but in his head ‘a twittering birds’-nest/ of books liable to be confiscated’. In Aachen Heine first comes in contact again with the Prussian military:

These people are still the same wooden types,
Spout pedantic commonplaces -
All motions right-angled - and priggishness
Is frozen upon their faces.

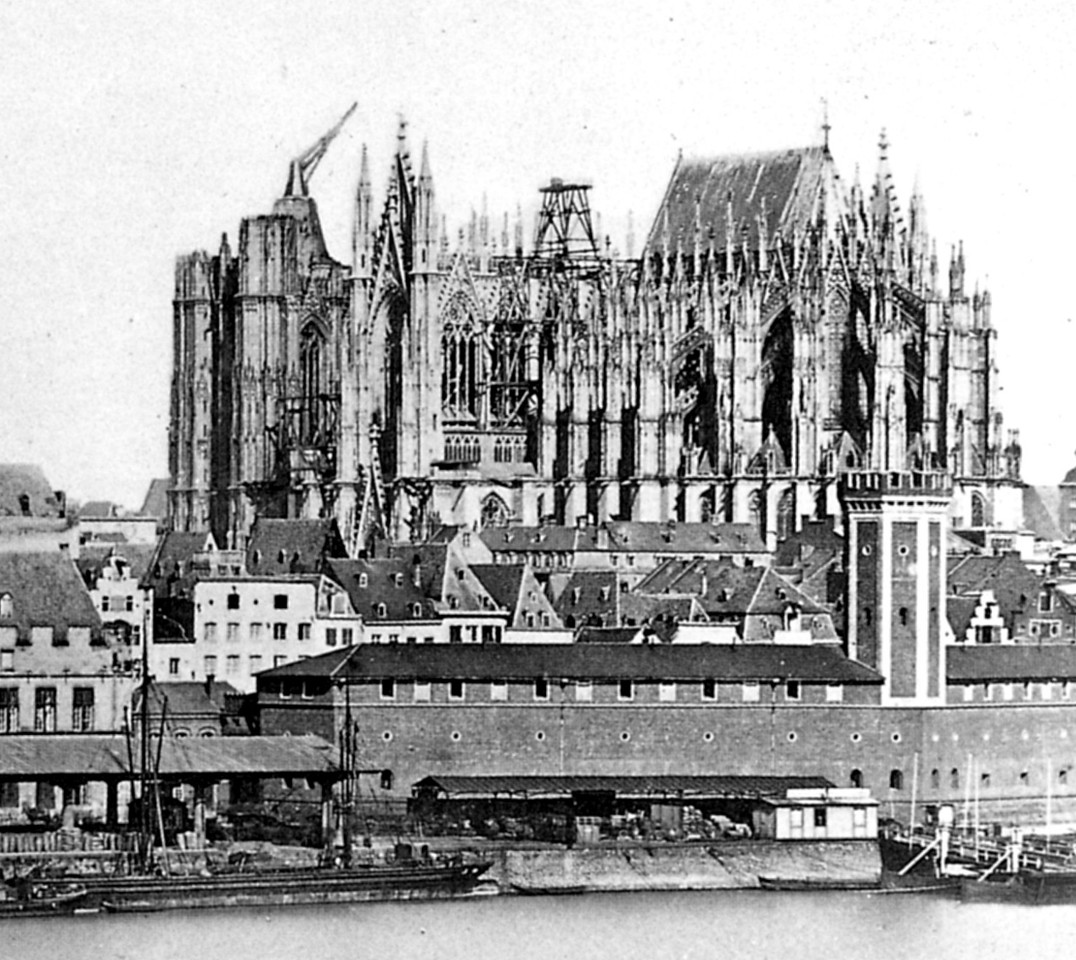
Unfinished Cologne Cathedral in 1856, the year of Heine's death.

In Section IV on the winter-journey to Cologne he mocks the anachronistic German society, that more readily with archaic skills builds the Cologne Cathedral, unfinished since the Middle Ages, than addressing itself to the Present Age. That the anachronistic building works came to be discontinued in the course of the Reformation indicated for the poet a positive advance: the overcoming of traditional ways of thought and the end of spiritual juvenility or adolescence.
In Section V he comes to the Rhine, as ‘the German Rhine’ and ‘Father Rhine’, icon and memorial of German identity. The River-god however shows himself as a sorrowful old man, disgusted with the babble about Germanic identity. He does not long to go back among the French who, according to Heine, now drink beer and read ‘Fichte’ and Kant.
Section VI introduces the ‘Liktor’, the poet's demon and ghostly doppelganger, always present, who follows him about carrying a hatchet under his cloak, waiting for a sign to execute the poet's judicial sentences. The stanzas express Heine's conviction that an idea once thought can never be lost. He confronts the shadowy figure, and is told:

In Rome an ax was carried before
A consul, may I remind you.
You too have your lictor, but nowadays
The ax is carried behind you.

I am your lictor: in the rear
You always hear the clink of
The headsman's ax that follows you.
I am the deed you think of.

In Section VII the Execution begins in dream. Followed by his ‘silent attendant’ the poet wanders through Cologne. He marks the doorposts with his heart’s blood, and this gives the Liktor the signal for a death-sentence. At last he reaches the Cathedral with the Three Kings Shrine, and “smashes up the poor skeletons of Superstition.’
In Section VIII he travels further on to Hagen and Mülheim, places which bring to mind his former enthusiasm for Napoleon Bonaparte. His transformation of Europe had called awake in Heine the hope for universal freedom. However: the Emperor is dead. Heine had been an eye-witness in Paris of his burial in 1840 at Les Invalides.
Section IX brings culinary reminiscences of ‘homely Sauerkraut’ seasoned with satirical pointedness: Section X, Greetings to Westphalia.

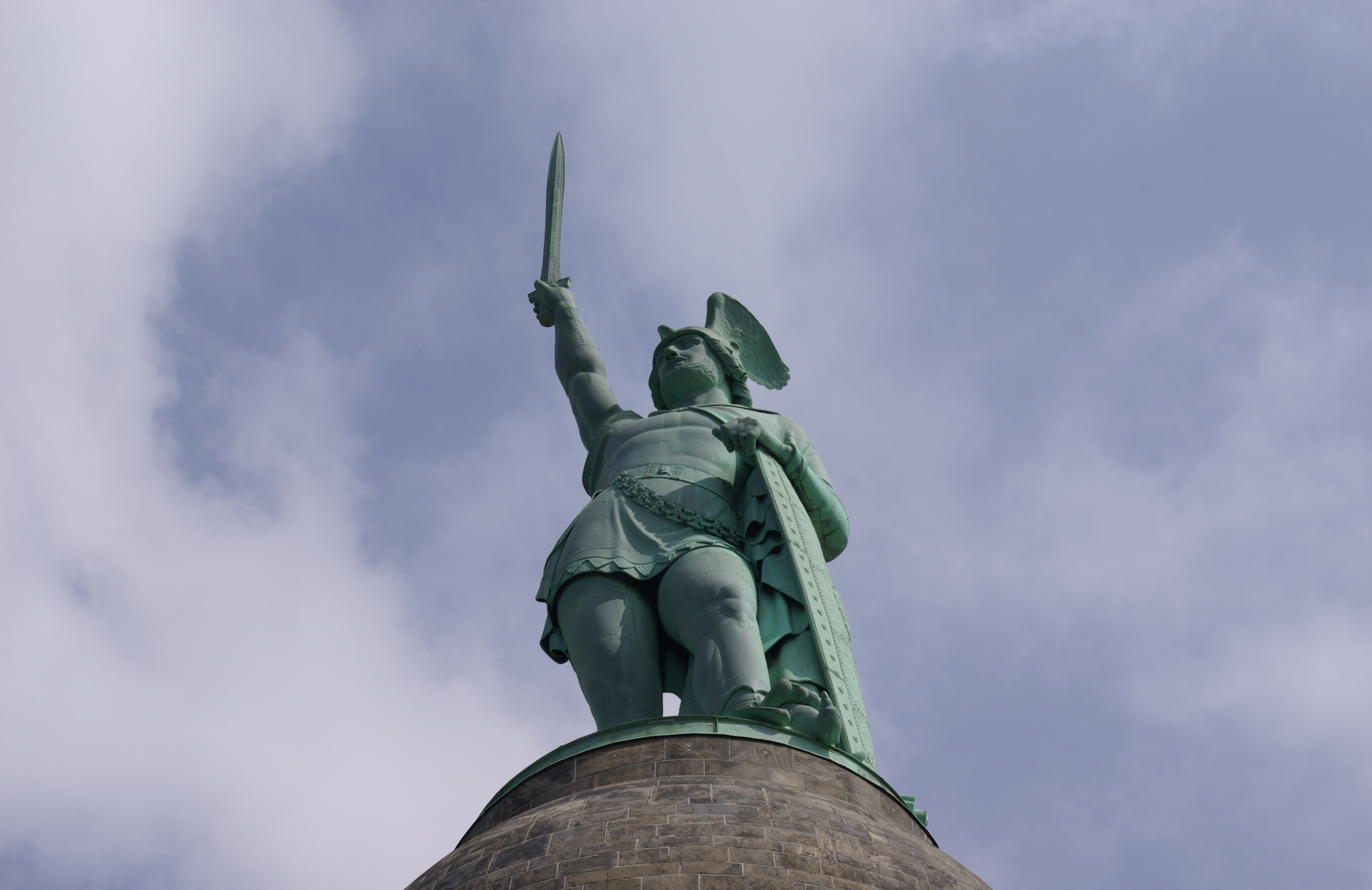
Hermannsdenkmal, Teutoburg Forest

In Section XI he travels through the Teutoburg Forest and fantasizes about what might have happened if Hermann of the Cherusci had not there vanquished the Roman army under Publius Quinctilius Varus and ended both colonialism and Romanisation east of the Rhine River. Otherwise, Romanitas and the depravity of the Roman nobility described by Seutonius and Tacitus would have permeated to the spiritual core of the German people, and in place of the ‘Three Dozen Fathers of the Provinces’ there would have been by now at least one proper Nero. The Section is also a disguised attack on the preference for Neoclassicism in the Kingdom of Prussia by the ‘Romantic on the Throne,’ Friedrich Wilhelm IV; and against the significant individuals in this movement (for example Raumer, Hengstenberg, Birch-Pfeiffer, Schelling, Maßmann, Cornelius), who all lived in Berlin. In direct contrast to Lewis H. Lapham's counterfactual history essay in the 1999 volume What If?, which attempted to draw a straight line of cause and effect between the Battle of the Teutoburg Forest in 9 A.D. and the Nazi war crimes of the 20th-century, Heine ends by instead expressing gratitude for the decolonisation of the province of Germania Antiqua under the leadership of Hermann and proudly reports his own decision to become of the first to donate money towards the building of the Hermannsdenkmal.
Section XII contains the poet's address on the theme: ‘Howling with the wolves,’ as the carriage breaks down in the forest at night, and he responds as the denizens of the forest serenade him. This Heine offers as a metaphoric statement of the critical distance occupied by himself as polemic or satirical poet, and of the sheepskin-costume appropriate for much of what was surrounding him.

I am no sheep, I am no dog,
No Councillor, and no shellfish –
I have remained a wolf, my heart
And all my fangs are wolfish.

Section XIII takes the traveller to Paderborn. In the morning mist a crucifix appears. The ‘poor jewish cousin’ had even less good fortune than Heine, since the kindly Censor had at least held back from having him crucified – until now, at any rate ...

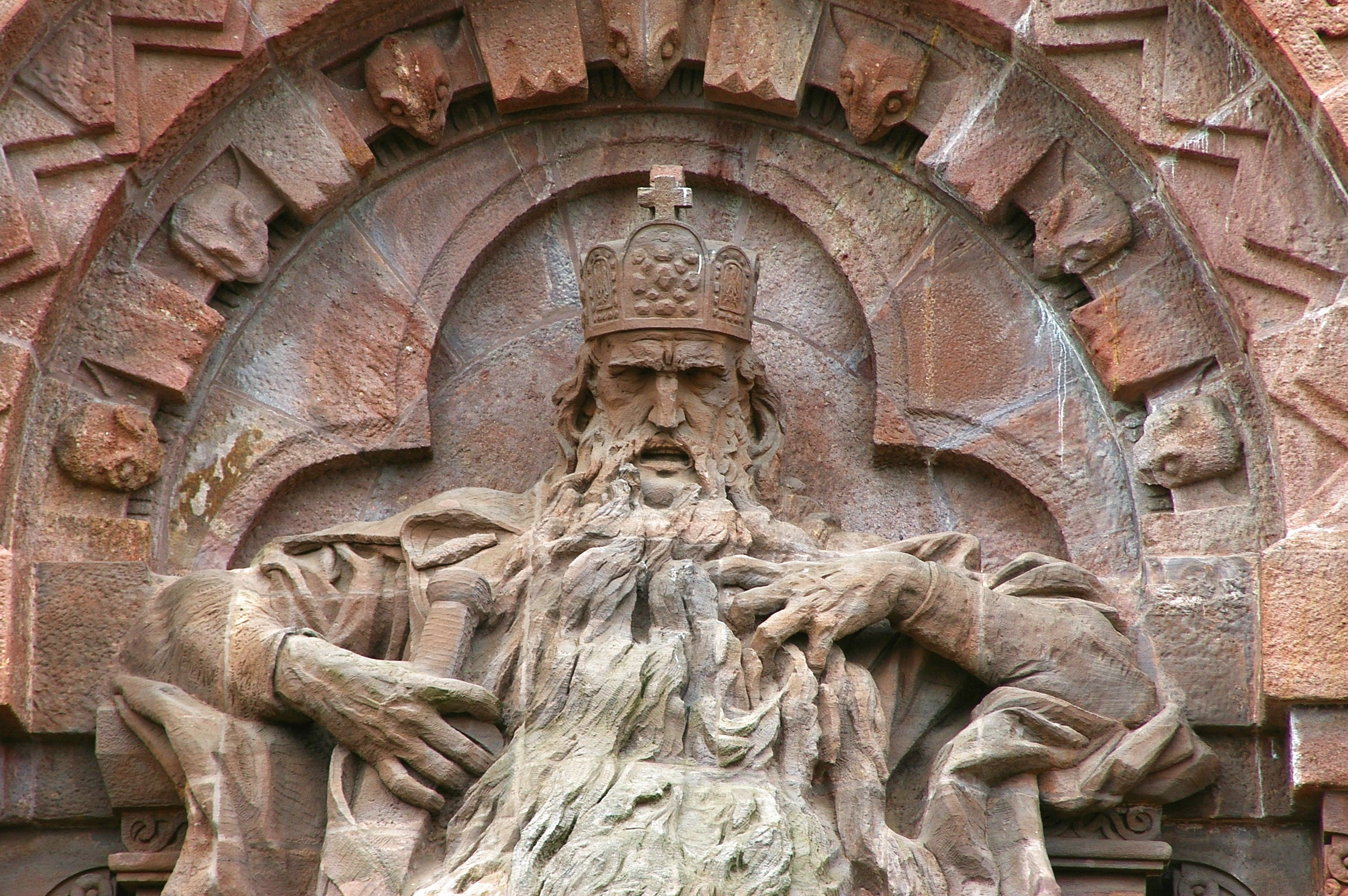
Kyffhäuser Monument

In Section XIV and Section XV the poet betakes himself in a dream to another memorable place: he visits Friedrich Barbarossa in Kyffhäuser. Not surprisingly the mythic German Emperor presents himself as a man become imbecile through senility, who is above all proud of the fact that his banner has not yet been eaten by moths. Germany in internal need? Pressing need of business for an available Emperor? Wake up, old man, and take your beard off the table! What does the most ancient hero mean by it?

He who comes not today, tomorrow surely comes,
But slowly doth the oak awaken,
And ‘he who goes softly goes well*’, so runs
The proverb in the Roman kingdom.

(*chi va piano va sano, Italian)
Section XVI brings the Emperor to the most recent state of affairs: between the Middle Ages and Modern Times, between Barbarossa and today stands and functions the guillotine. Emperors have worn out their usefulness, and seen in that light Monarchs are also superfluous. Stay up the mountain, Old Man! Best of all, the nobility, along with that ‘gartered knighthood of gothic madness and modern lie,’ should stay there too with you in Kyffhäuser (Section XVII). Sword or noose would do equally good service for the disposal of these superfluous toadies.
Dealings with the police remain unpleasant in Minden, followed by the obligatory nightmare and dream of revenge (Section XVIII). In Section XIX he visits the house where his grandfather was born in Bückeburg:

At Bückeburg I went up into the town,
To view the old fortress, the Stammburg,
The place where my grandfather was born;
My grandmother came from Hamburg.

From there he went on to a meeting with King Ernest Augustus of Hanover in that place, who, "accustomed to life in Great Britain" detains him for a deadly length of time. The section refers above all to the violation of the constitution by Ernst August in the year 1837, who was opposed by the seven Göttingen professors. Finally, in Section XX, he is at the limit of his journey: In Hamburg he goes in to visit his mother. She, equally, is in control of her responsibilities:

- 1. Are you hungry?
- 2. Have you got a wife?
- 3. Where would you rather live, here with me or in France?
- 4. Do you always talk about politics?

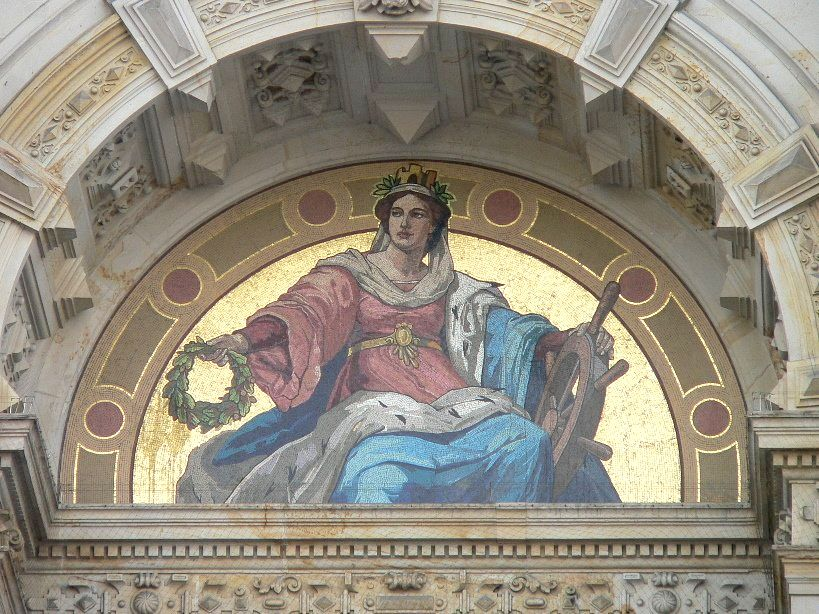
Hammonia above the balcony of Hamburg Town Hall

Section XXI and XXII shows the poet in Hamburg in search of people he knows, and memories, and in Section XXIII he sings the praises of the publisher Campe. Section XXIV describes a meeting with the genius loci of Hamburg, Hammonia. A solemn promise of the greatest secrecy must be made in Old Testament fashion, in which he places his hand under the thigh of the Goddess (she blushes slightly – having been drinking rum!). Then the Goddess promises to show her visitor the future Germany. Universal expectation. Then the Censor makes a cut at the critical place. Disappointment. (Section XXV and XXVI) With Section XXVII the Winter’s Tale ends:

The Youth soon buds, who understands
The poet’s pride and grandeur
And in his heart he warms himself,
At his soul’s sunny splendour.

In the final stanzas Heine places himself in the tradition of Aristophanes and Dante and speaks directly to the King of Prussia:

Then do not harm your living bards,
For they have fire and arms
More frightful than Jove’s thunderbolt:
Through them the Poet forms.

With a warning to the King, of eternal damnation, the epic closes.

== A critic for love of the Fatherland ==
Deutschland. Ein Wintermärchen shows Heine’s world of images and his folk-song-like poetic diction in a compact gathering, with cutting, ironic criticisms of the circumstances in his homeland. Heine puts his social vision into contrast with the grim ‘November-picture’ of the reactionary homeland which presented itself to his eyes:

A new song, a better song,
O friends, I speak to thee!
Here upon Earth we shall full soon
A heavenly realm decree.
Joyful we on earth shall be
And we shall starve no more;
The rotten belly shall not feed
On the fruits of industry.

Above all Heine criticized German militarism and reactionary chauvinism (i.e. nationalism), especially in contrast to the French, whose revolution he understood as a breaking-off into freedom. He admired Napoleon (uncritically) as the man who achieved the Revolution and made freedom a reality. He did not see himself as an enemy of Germany, but rather as a critic out of love for the Fatherland:

Plant the black, red, gold banner at the summit of the German idea, make it the standard of free mankind, and I will shed my dear heart’s blood for it. Rest assured, I love the Fatherland just as much as you do.

(from the Foreword).

== Reception ==
Heine’s verse-epic was much debated in Germany right down to our own times. Above all in the century to which it belonged, the work was labelled as the ‘shameful writing’ of a homeless or country-less man, a ‘betrayer of the Fatherland’, a detractor and a slanderer. This way of looking at Deutschland. Ein Wintermärchen was carried, especially in the period of Nazism, into a ridiculous antisemitic caricature. Immediately after World War II a cheap edition of the poem with Heine’s Foreword and an introduction by Wolfgang Goetz was published by the Wedding-Verlag in Berlin in 1946.

Modern times see in Heine’s work – rather, the basis of a wider concern with nationalism and narrow concepts of German identity, against the backdrop of European integration – a weighty political poem in the German language: sovereign in its insight and inventive wit, stark in its images, masterly in its use of language. Heine’s figure-creations (like, for example, the ‘Liktor’) are skilful, and memorably portrayed.

A great deal of the attraction which the verse-epic holds today is grounded in this, that its message is not one-dimensional, but rather brings into expression the many-sided contradictions or contrasts in Heine’s thought. The poet shows himself as a man who loves his homeland and yet can only be a guest and visitor to it. In the same way that Antaeus needed contact with the Earth, so Heine drew his skill and the fullness of his thought only through intellectual contact with the homeland.

This exemplified the visible breach which the French July Revolution of 1830 signifies for intellectual Germany: the fresh breeze of freedom suffocated in the reactionary exertions of the Metternich Restoration, the soon-downtrodden ‘Spring’ of freedom yielded to a new winter of censorship, repression, persecution and exile; the dream of a free and democratic Germany was for a whole century dismissed from the realm of possibility.

Deutschland. Ein Wintermärchen is a high-point of political poetry of the Vormärz period before the March Revolution of 1848, and in Germany is part of the official educational curriculum. The work taken for years and decades as the anti-German pamphlet of the ‘voluntary Frenchman’ Heine, today is for many people the most moving poem ever written by an emigrant.

Recently, reference to this poem has been made by director Sönke Wortmann for his football documentary on the German male national team during the 2006 FIFA world cup. The movie is entitled "Deutschland. Ein Sommermärchen". The world cup in 2006 is often mentioned as a point in time which had a significant positive impact on modern Germany, reflecting a changed understanding of national identity which has been evolving continuously over the 50 years prior to the event.

== Editions ==
German editions

- Heinrich Heine. Historico-critical complete edition of the Works. Edited by Manfred Windfuhr. Vol. 4: Atta Troll. Ein Sommernachtstraum / Deutschland. Ein Wintermärchen. Revised by Winfried Woesler. (Hoffmann und Campe, Hamburg 1985).
- H. H. Deutschland. Ein Wintermärchen. Edited by Joseph Kiermeier-Debre. (Deutscher Taschenbuch Verlag, Munich 1997.) (Bibliothek der Erstausgaben.) ISBN 3-423-02632-4
- H. H. Deutschland. Ein Wintermärchen. Edited by Werner Bellmann. Revised Edition. (Reclam, Stuttgart 2001.) ISBN 3-15-002253-3
- H. H. Deutschland. Ein Wintermärchen. Edited by Werner Bellmann. Illustrations by Hans Traxler.(Reclam, Stuttgart 2005.) ISBN 3-15-010589-7 (Paperback: Reclam, Stuttgart 2011, ISBN 978-3-15-020236-4)

Translations into English

- Deutschland: A Not So Sentimental Journey by Heinrich Heine. Translated (into English) with an Introduction and Notes by T. J. Reed (Angel Books, London 1986). ISBN 0-946162-58-1
- Germany. A Winter's Tale in: Hal Draper: The Complete Poems of Heinrich Heine. A Modern English Version (Suhrkamp/Insel Publishers Boston Inc. 1982). ISBN 3-518-03062-0

== Sources ==
- Werner Bellmann: Heinrich Heine. Deutschland. Ein Wintermärchen. Illustrations and Documents. Revised Edition. (Reclam, Stuttgart 2005.) ISBN 3-15-008150-5
- Karlheinz Fingerhut: Heinrich Heine: Deutschland. Ein Wintermärchen. (Diesterweg, Frankfurt am Main 1992). (Grundlagen und Gedanken zum Verständnis erzählender Literatur) ISBN 3-425-06167-4
- Jost Hermand: Heines Wintermärchen – On the subject of the 'deutsche Misere'. In: Diskussion Deutsch 8 (1977) Heft 35. p 234-249.
- Joseph A. Kruse: Ein neues Lied vom Glück? (A new song of happiness?) Heinrich Heines Deutschland. Ein Wintermärchen. In: J. A. K.: Heine-Zeit. (Stuttgart/München 1997) p 238-255.
- Renate Stauf: Heinrich Heine. Deutschland. Ein Wintermärchen. In: Renate Stauf/Cord Berghahn (Editors): Weltliteratur II. Eine Braunschweiger Vorlesung. (Bielefeld 2005). p 269-284.
- Jürgen Walter: Deutschland. Ein Wintermärchen. In: Heinrich Heine. Epoche - Werk - Wirkung. Edited by Jürgen Brummack. (Beck, München 1980). p 238-254.
