= Zentral-Dombauverein zu Köln von 1842 =

Society for promotion and preservation of the Cologne Cathedral

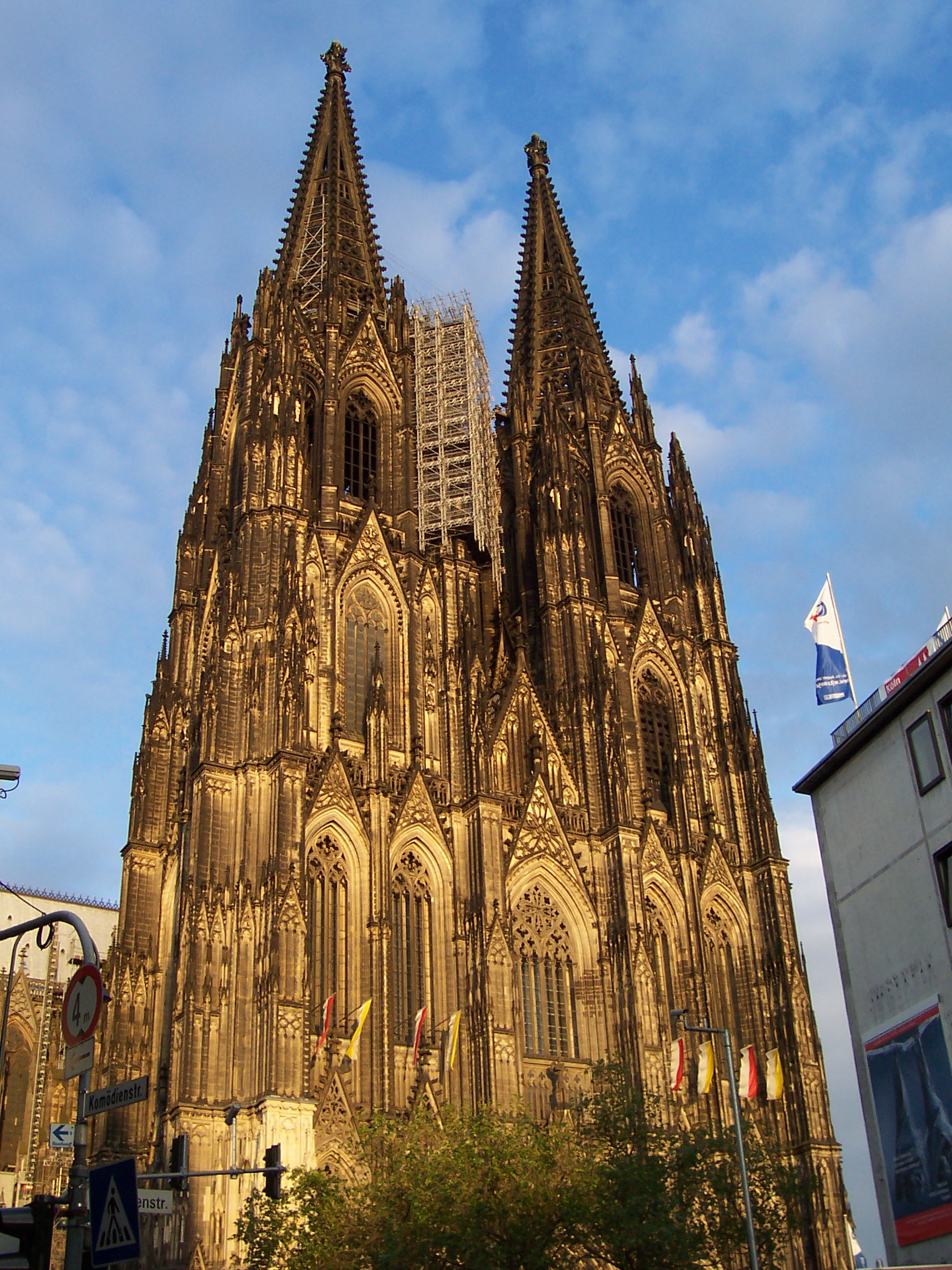

The Zentral-Dombau-Verein zu Köln von 1842 (Central Cathedral Building Society of 1842; formerly "Central-"), abbreviated ZDV, is one of the oldest and once largest NGOs and civic associations of Germany, Europe, and indeed the world. It was founded to promote and finance the completion of Cologne Cathedral, one of the most important Gothic buildings and churches globally and a UNESCO World Heritage Site, and continues to ensure the never-ending restoration and maintenance of the cathedral.

== History ==
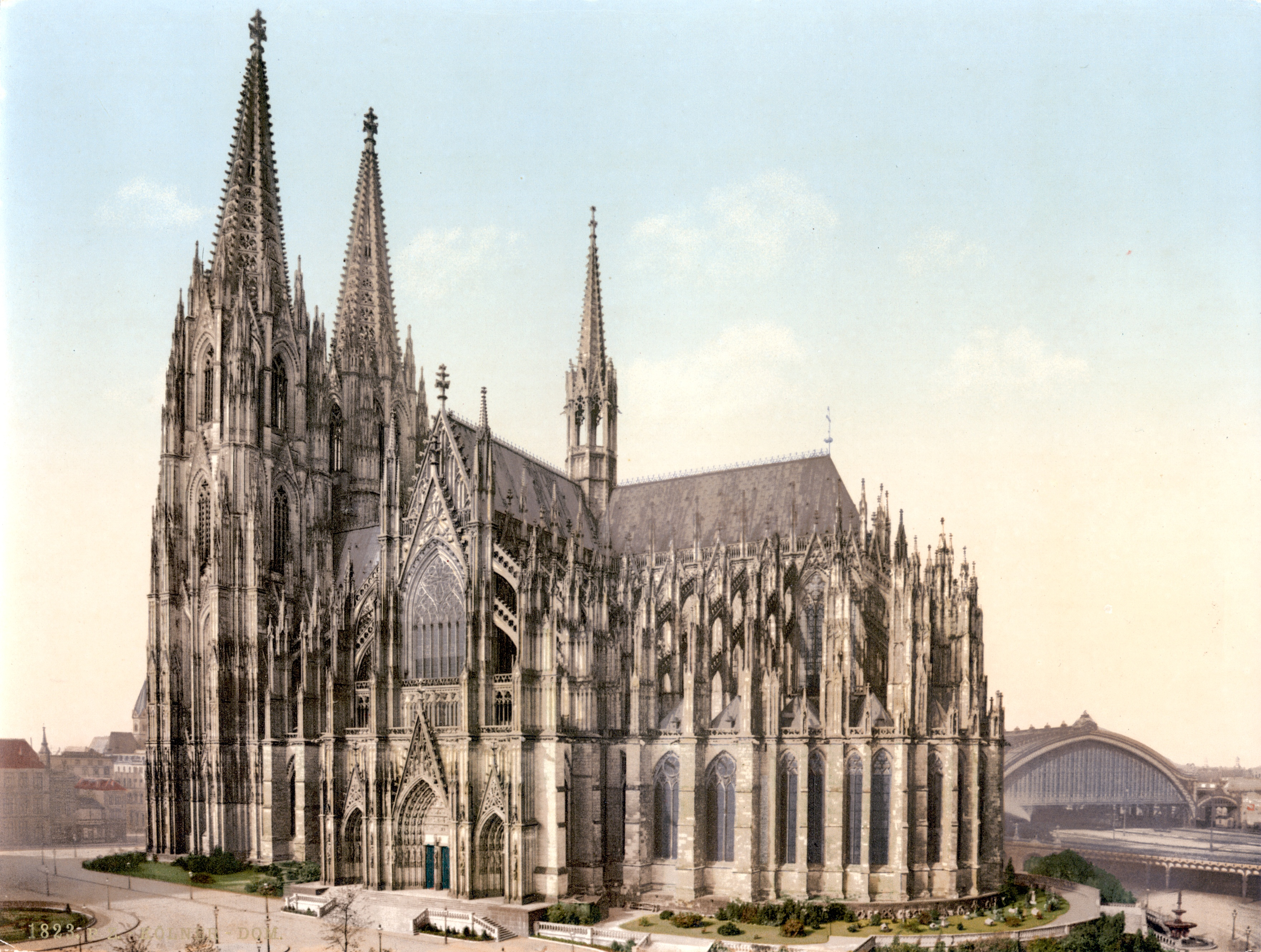

=== Heine and the Winter's Tale ===
The most famous reference to the ZDV is in Heinrich Heine's satirical poem, Germany. A Winter's Tale (Deutschland. Ein Wintermärchen, 1844) chapter IV. Heine sees the Cologne Cathedral as a monument to Catholicism and un-Germanness, Christian intolerance, and Cologne as a truly bad city, and calls the promoters, including the Prussians and their king, confused and counter-productive. Since he does so in superb and witty poetry – the Winter's Tale is generally acknowledged to be the high-point of lyrical satire in German – the criticism has endured and is very striking. For Heine, the non-completion of the cathedral is the "monument to Germany's power and Protestant mission".

You poor fools from the Domverein,
You want, with weak hands,
To resume the interrupted work
And complete the old fortress!

== Organization ==
The ZDV is one of the very few associations that does not have to conform to the German Vereinsrecht (laws concerning NGOs), because it predates these laws. In fact, the ZDV is still governed according to the cabinet order of 8 December 1841 by the king of Prussia, Frederick William IV, who also was its first patron.

Today, the ZDV has over 15,000 members (2021: 17.481) and a board of 40, of which 10 are replaced every four years.

Membership is completely open, but it is still considered prestigious, especially in the Rhineland. Membership in the board is a good indicator that one belongs to the wealthiest and most respected insiders of Cologne, which is well known for its governance by a closed elite (Kölscher Klüngel). It is denoted by a small golden lapel pin showing the cathedral's facade and the letters ZDV.

== Finances ==
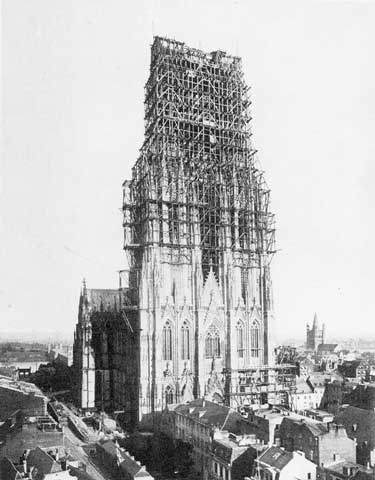

The cost to complete the cathedral, between 1842 and 1880, which was not an effort by the Catholic Church but by Protestant Prussia and the Cologne, Rhineland, and German citizens, amounted to US$1 billion in today's currency. Of this, one-third was paid by the State of Prussia, and two-thirds by the ZDV. Another US$1 billion was paid to "unveil" the cathedral, i.e. to purchase the houses around it and make it possible to view it from all sides; of this amount, half was financed by the ZDV. Much of the Verein's income derived from a special lottery, the Dombaulotterie.

Today, the annual budget of the cathedral, which amounts to appr. US$3,5 million, is financed by half by the ZDV. The income of the ZDV — US$5 million in 2021 — comes from membership fees, donations, bequests, fines (German judges can order that fines in civil cases are paid to the ZDV), and especially a federal lottery.

Legally, the cathedral belongs to itself, not to the Catholic Church or the Archbishop; not even to the Metropolitan Chapter, which administers it based on the legal fiction that it has been charged with this by the cathedral.

== Prominent members ==
- Konrad Adenauer
- Mark Benecke
- Wolfgang Drechsler
- Josef Frings
- Johann Wolfgang von Goethe
- Joseph Görres
- Joachim Meisner
- Manfred Melzer
- Willy Millowitsch
- Fritz Schramma

== Bibliography ==
- Kölner Domblatt, yearbook of the ZDV; last issue is vol. 88, 2023
- Pilger, Kathrin (2004), Der Kölner Zentral-Dombau-Verein im 19. Jahrhundert. Zur Konstitutierung des Bürgertums durch formale Organisation, Köln: SH-Verlag (The Central Cathedral Building Association of Cologne in the 19th Century. The Constitution for the middle class through a formal organization.)
