= Frederick William IV =

King of Prussia from 1840 to 1861

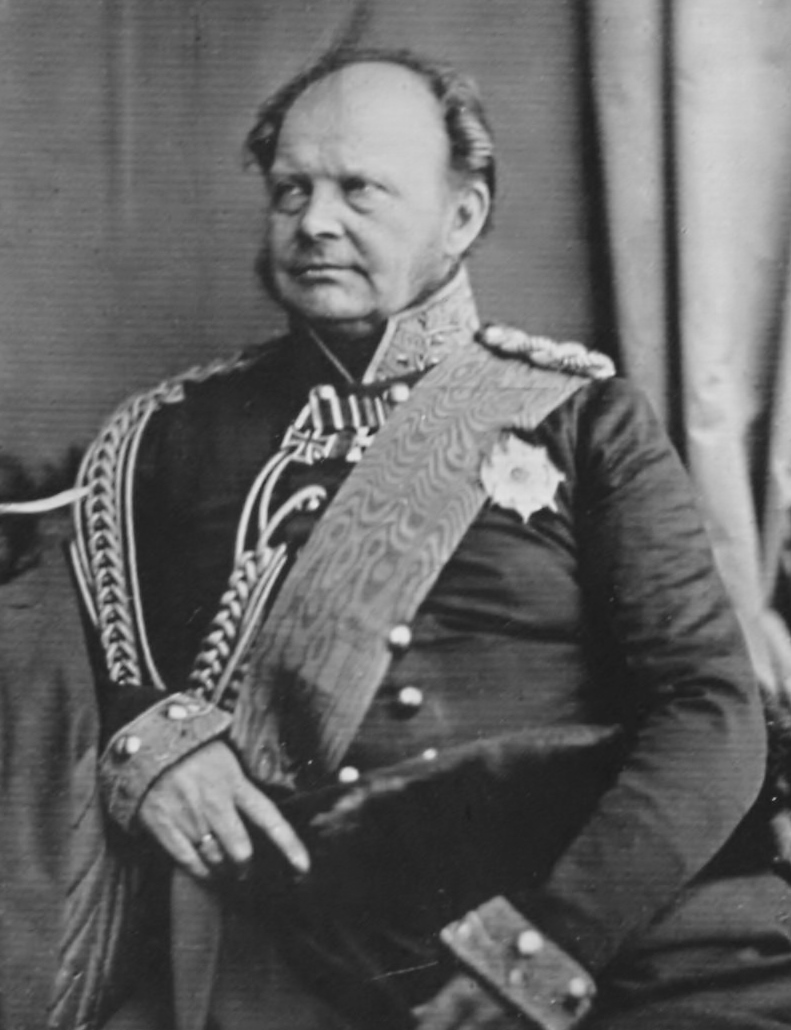
- Frederick William IV in 1847

King of Prussia
- Reign: 7 June 1840 – 2 January 1861
- Predecessor: Frederick William III
- Successor: Wilhelm I
- Regent: Prince Wilhelm (1858–1861)

President of the Erfurt Union
- Reign: 26 May 1849 – 29 November 1850
- Born: 15 October 1795; Kronprinzenpalais, Berlin, Kingdom of Prussia, Holy Roman Empire
- Died: 2 January 1861 (aged 65); Sanssouci, Potsdam, Kingdom of Prussia, German Confederation
- Burial: Crypt of the Friedenskirche, Sanssouci Park, Potsdam (Heart in the Mausoleum at Charlottenburg Palace, Berlin)
- Spouse: Elisabeth Ludovika of Bavaria (m. 1823)
- House: Hohenzollern
- Father: Frederick William III of Prussia
- Mother: Louise of Mecklenburg-Strelitz
- Religion: Calvinist (Prussian United)

Frederick William IV (German: Friedrich Wilhelm IV.; 15 October 1795 – 2 January 1861) was King of Prussia from 7 June 1840 until his death in 1861. Also referred to as the "romanticist on the throne", he was deeply religious and believed that he ruled by divine right. He feared revolutions, and his ideal state was one governed by the Christian estates of the realm rather than a constitutional monarchy.

In spite of his conservative political philosophy, he initially pursued a moderate policy of easing press censorship, releasing political prisoners and reconciling with the Catholic population of the kingdom. During the German revolutions of 1848–1849, he was initially forced to accommodate the people's revolutionary sentiments, although he rejected the title of Emperor of the Germans offered by the Frankfurt Parliament in 1849, believing that it did not have the right to make such an offer. In December 1848, he dissolved the Prussian National Assembly when he found its constitutional proposals too radical. At the urging of his ministry, which wanted to prevent a renewal of unrest, he imposed a constitution with a parliament and a strong monarch. He then used the Prussian military to help put down revolutionary forces throughout the German Confederation.

Frederick William IV had an artistic nature and an interest in architecture. He extended the building ensembles of the Berlin-Potsdam Residence Landscape, Museum Island, and the cultural landscape of the Upper Middle Rhine Valley, and he supported the completion of the Cologne Cathedral. All are now UNESCO World Heritage Sites.

From 1857 to 1861, he suffered several strokes and was left incapacitated until his death. His brother and heir presumptive Wilhelm served as regent after 1858 and then succeeded him as king.

== Crown Prince ==
Born to Frederick William III and his wife Queen Louise, Frederick William was his mother's favourite son. He was educated by private tutors, including the historian and statesman Friedrich Ancillon. When Queen Louise died in 1810 when Frederick William was 14, he saw it as a punishment from God and linked it directly to his outlook on life. He believed that only by leading a life more pleasing to God would he be able to absolve himself of the guilt he felt for her death.

Frederick William's early childhood fell during a period in which the European monarchies were confronted with the revolutionary challenge of the French Revolution. By calling the dynastic tradition into question, the execution of Louis XVI in 1793 helped create the conditions for Frederick William's later political orientation towards historical continuity and tradition. Since there was a danger that he and his younger brother William might be captured by the French after the Prussians lost the Battle of Jena–Auerstedt on 14 October 1806, they were taken to Königsberg in East Prussia on 17 October 1806. After their parents arrived on 9 December 1806, they fled together from the advancing troops to Memel.

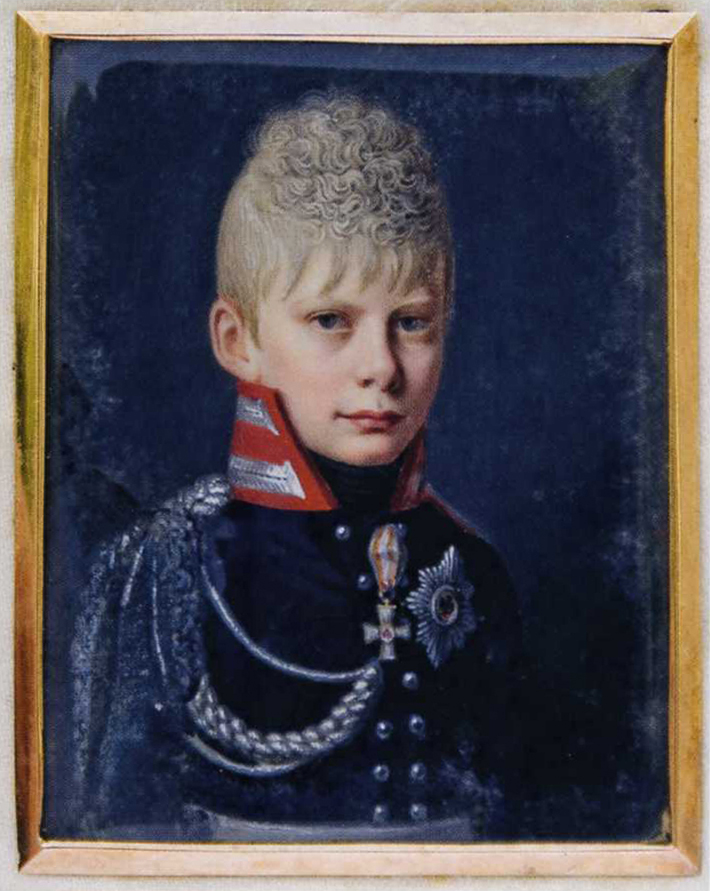
Portrait of Crown Prince Frederick William, c. 1810

After Prussia's defeat and the family's return to Berlin, Frederick William's education was adapted more to prepare him for governing. He was generally dismissive of the Prussian reforms that were then underway with the aim of modernising the state from within. His tutor Friedrich Delbrück had instilled in him a disgust of revolutionaries, so that he had no sympathy for Karl August von Hardenberg's insistence that Prussia be reorganised through a "revolution from above". For Friedrich Wilhelm, the "bureaucratic absolutism of a Hardenberg" meant moving away from the "principle of the estates" that he advocated.

The high point of Frederick William's youth was his participation in the campaigns against Napoleon in the Wars of Liberation of 1813/1814 that pushed the French out of Germany. In his experience with war, which showed him to be an indifferent soldier, the boundaries between patriotism and religious fervour became blurred. He saw the conflict as a crusade against the ideas of the Enlightenment and the French Revolution. In many pieces of correspondence from the period, the Crown Prince wrote about religious experiences using elements of the Pietist revivalist movement, including the subjective experience of God, the power of personal prayer and individual striving for salvation and redemption.

Frederick William was a Romanticist, and his devotion to the movement, which in the German states featured nostalgia for the Middle Ages, played a part in his developing a conservative worldview at an early age. In 1815, when he was twenty, the Crown Prince exerted his influence to structure the proposed new constitution of 1815, which was never enacted, in such a way that the landed aristocracy would hold the greatest power. He was against the liberalisation of Germany and aspired to unify its many states within what he viewed as a historically legitimate framework, inspired by the ancient laws and customs of the Holy Roman Empire, which had been dissolved under Napoleon in 1806.

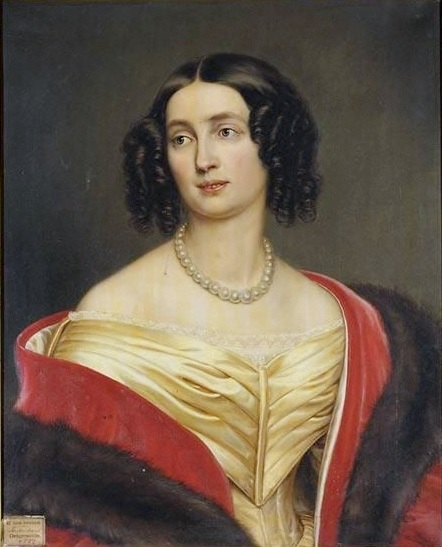
Queen Elisabeth Ludovica of Prussia at an unspecified date

He was a draftsman interested in both architecture and landscape gardening and was a patron of several great German artists, including architect Karl Friedrich Schinkel and composer Felix Mendelssohn. In 1823 he married Elisabeth Ludovika of Bavaria. Since she was a Roman Catholic, the preparations for the marriage included difficult negotiations which ended with her conversion to Lutheranism. There were two wedding ceremonies – one in Munich by proxy according to the Catholic rite, and the other in person in Berlin. The couple had a harmonious marriage, but after Elisabeth had a miscarriage in 1828, it remained childless.

== Early reign ==
Frederick William became king of Prussia on the death of his father in 1840. Through a personal union, he was also the sovereign prince of the Principality of Neuchâtel (1840–1848), which at the same time was a canton in the Swiss Confederation and the only one that was a principality. In 1842, he gave his father's menagerie at Pfaueninsel to the new Berlin Zoo, which opened its gates in 1844 as the first of its kind in Germany. Other projects during his reign – often involving his close collaboration with the architects – included the Alte Nationalgalerie (Old National Gallery) and the Neues Museum in Berlin, the Orangery Palace at Potsdam as well as the reconstruction of Stolzenfels Castle on the Rhine and Hohenzollern Castle, in the ancestral homelands of the dynasty which became part of Prussia in 1850. He also enlarged and redecorated his father's Erdmannsdorf manor house.

In 1842, on the advice of Alexander von Humboldt, he founded the separate civil class of the Pour le Merite, the Order Pour le Mérite for Sciences and Arts (Orden Pour le Mérite für Wissenschaften und Künste). The civil order is still being awarded today.

Frederick William IV's accession to the throne came with great expectations among liberals and nationalists. By beginning his reign with a policy of reconciliation, the new king fulfilled their hopes during his first six months on the throne. Through an amnesty enacted on 10 August 1840, all "political criminals" were released, politically motivated investigations and court proceedings were discontinued, and press censorship was eased.

As a result of the concessions, liberals initially overlooked the fact that Frederick William IV was not of one mind with them. The King intended his policy of reconciliation to restore trust in a medieval-feudal relationship of loyalty between the Prussian people and the monarch, making the liberal reform of the state along the lines of the French constitutional-parliamentary model superfluous. He believed that he derived his close ties to his people from the divine right of grace, which gave him a "sacred insight into the needs of his subjects". Any restriction of his de facto absolutist power seemed to him to be an irresponsible obstruction of his divinely ordained mission.

=== Religious policy ===
Frederick William IV was deeply religious. Influenced by Romanticism and the Pietist revivalist movement, he envisioned a Christian state and believed that only Christianity could protect his subjects from revolutionary utopias and reverse the secularisation, growing materialism and other processes of modernisation that he considered harmful. For Friedrich Wilhelm, religion and politics were inextricably linked.

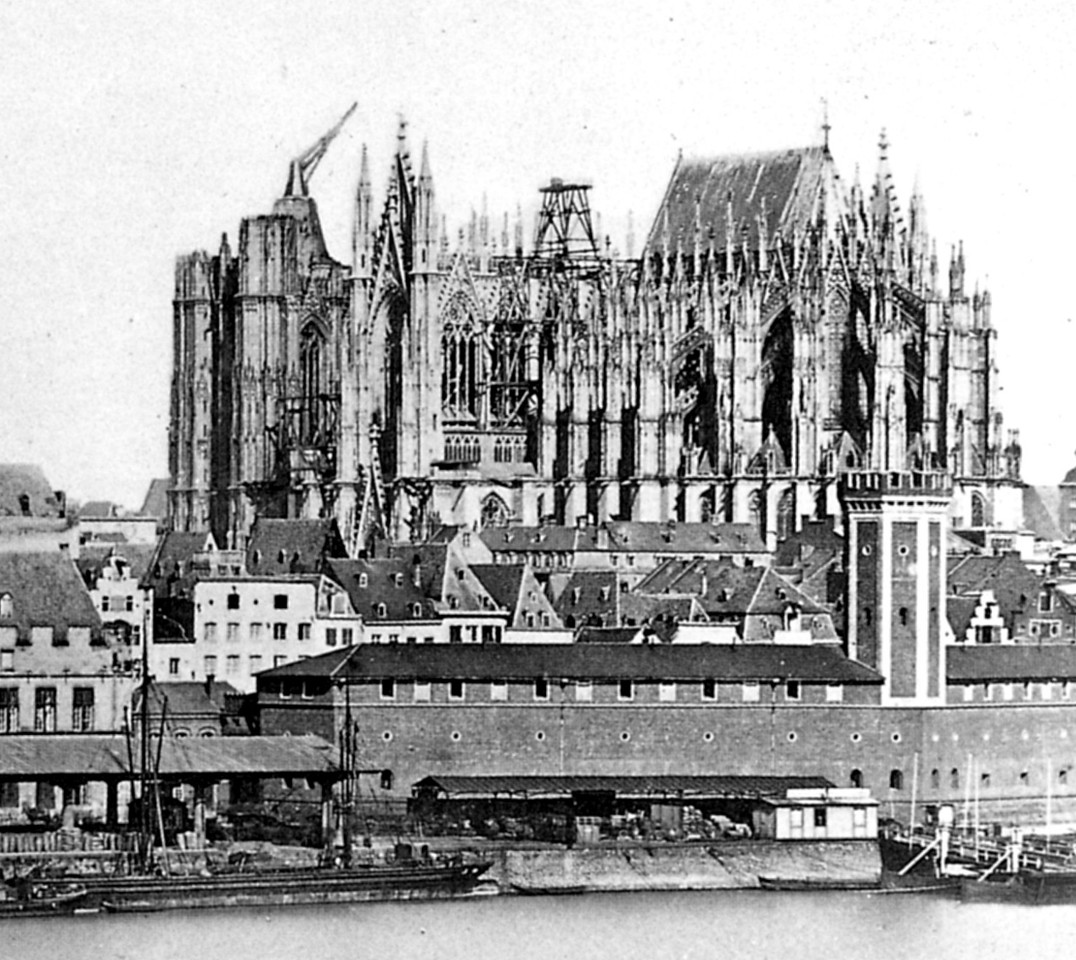
The Cologne Cathedral in 1856. King Frederick William IV provided the impetus to complete it over 600 years after construction began.

In contrast to his father, Frederick William was sympathetic to Catholicism. Under Frederick William III in 1825, the Archbishop of Cologne was arrested in a conflict over the law on mixed marriages. In order to reconcile with the Catholic population, Frederick William IV authorised the founding of the Cologne Cathedral Building Association in 1840 to promote and finance the completion of the Cologne Cathedral. Half of the funding for it came from the Prussian state treasury. For negotiations with the Roman Curia, the King announced in June 1840 that within the Ministry of Culture he would set up a department for Catholic affairs which was to consist exclusively of Catholic councillors.

With the founding of the Protestant Church in Prussia in 1817, in which Calvinists and Lutherans were united, Friedrich Wilhelm's father had created an institution for all Protestants in his kingdom that was directly dependent on the sovereign as the summus episcopus (high bishop). In response, the Old Lutherans formed their own church in 1830, claiming to represent the "true" Lutheran Church, and were consequently subjected to state persecution. In 1845 Frederick William lifted the ban on the formation of Old Lutheran churches and released imprisoned pastors.

=== The constitutional question ===
As part of his policy of reconciliation, Frederick William IV was interested in finding a solution to the question of a constitution for Prussia. At the core of his political philosophy was the doctrine of the organic nation of the estates of the realm, which was based on philosophers such as Friedrich Schlegel, who wrote in 1805: "The only lasting constitution is the monarchy of the estates, tempered by priests and nobility, and it is also the oldest and best." In the view of the "political romantics", the structure of the estates took the natural inequality of man into account. Individuals should fulfil the tasks and duties that serve the good of society as a whole in the place assigned to them by God. In the Prussian constitutional question, Frederick William IV was not striving for the realisation of a constitutional monarchy but rather a state governed by the Christian estates. He made this clear to the governor of the province of Prussia not long after his coronation:

I feel myself [to be king] entirely by the grace of God and will feel that way with His help until the end. Without envy I leave splendour and artifice to so-called constitutional princes, who have become a fiction, an abstract concept to the people through a piece of paper [a constitution].

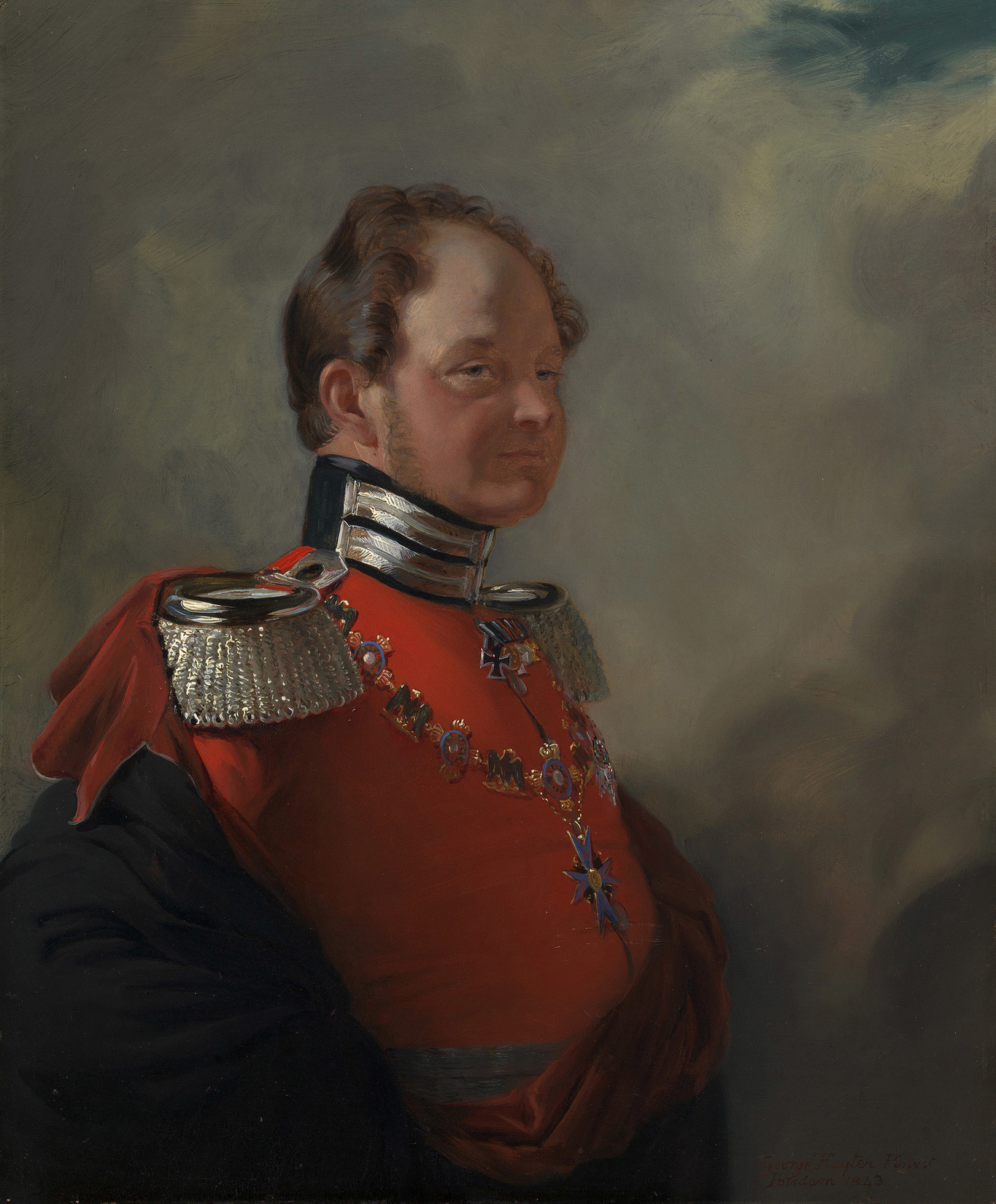
Portrait of Frederick William IV, by George Hayter, c. 1843

As his alternative to parliamentary-style popular legislatures, Frederick William IV focussed his attention on the Provincial Estates, the representative bodies of the eight Prussian provinces, which had been founded in 1823. In 1847 he summoned all representatives of the Prussian provincial parliaments to Berlin. He was prepared to give the United Parliament the right to discuss the financing of railways, canals and roads – specifically a request for a 25 million thaler bond for building the Berlin to Königsberg railway. He did not want to levy new taxes or take out loans without the United Parliament's consent, envisioning that their approval would not restrict his power but strengthen it by eliminating future constitutional demands.

In his opening speech, Frederick William reiterated that he did not want a "piece of paper" to come between himself and the people and replace the "old, sacred loyalty with it". He told the deputies of the limits he saw on their duties: "... it is not your job to represent opinions, to want to bring the opinions of the times to the fore. ... That is completely un-German and, beyond that, completely impractical."

The majority of the deputies nevertheless did not see themselves as representatives of the estates but of the Prussian people. On 20 April 1847, the parliament sent an address to the King calling for a regular convocation. Laws, they wrote, should only come into force with the consent of the United Parliament. Discrimination based on the estates should be abolished and the citizenry guaranteed legal protection against arbitrary measures by the state. If their demands were not fulfilled, they concluded, the parliament would be forced to reject the King's spending plans. Frederick William stopped attending parliamentary sessions and on 26 June 1847 dissolved the United Parliament.

With the failure of the First United Parliament, the government not only lost its ability to act on fiscal policy – the Prussian National Debt Act of January 1820 stipulating that the government could only take on new debt if it was co-guaranteed by the "imperial estates" remained in force – but also faced increased doubts within Prussia about the legitimacy of the existing state order.

=== The Industrial Revolution ===
During the reign of Frederick William IV, the Ruhr region, Silesia and Berlin slowly developed into centres of industrialisation. In spite of his politically backward-looking attitude, Frederick William supported the technological progress brought about by the Industrial Revolution, notably by using government bonds to promote the expansion of the railway network. The rapid industrial growth was accompanied by social tensions to which the King did not respond with any significant policies beyond donations to private social associations. In 1844, for example, he provided the Association for the Welfare of the Working Class with 15,000 thalers. The next year he issued a General Prussian Industrial Code that included a ban on strikes and prison sentences of up to a year for conspiring to encourage one.

== The Revolution of 1848/1849 ==
=== Outbreak ===
The overthrow of the French July Monarchy on 24 February 1848 triggered a revolutionary movement throughout Europe. Frederick William IV called for a congress of German states that was to meet in Dresden on 25 March. By discussing reform of the German Confederation, the King hoped to appease the people's revolutionary sentiments, but before he could implement his plans, they were overtaken by the events of the revolution in Berlin.

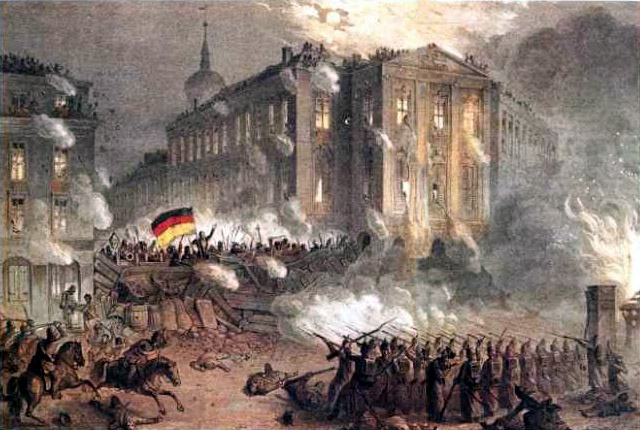
Painting of a barricade battle in Berlin's Alexanderplatz in 1848, with the rebellion's black, red and gold flag prominent in the background

The sound of the fighting could be heard in the Berlin Palace. Although the Berlin barricade battle was one of the most costly incidents of the March Revolution, with 300 casualties among the demonstrators at the hands of Prussian troops, the King rejected any responsibility and instead spread the false report of a foreign conspiracy in his manifesto 'To my dear Berliners': "A gang of villains, mostly consisting of foreigners, ... has become the ghastly author of bloodshed."

On 21 March 1848, the King, or rather his camarilla, initiated an apparent change of course by placing Frederick William IV at the head of the revolution, whereas the truth was that he lacked the means to pursue a policy independent of the citizens' movement. The King announced that he would support the formation of an all-German parliament, one of the revolution's key demands. On 21 March 1848, he rode through the city wearing a black, red and gold armband – the colours of the revolution – and had an officer dressed in civilian clothes carry a similarly coloured flag in front of him. The King repeatedly stopped to make improvised speeches to affirm his alleged support for German unity.

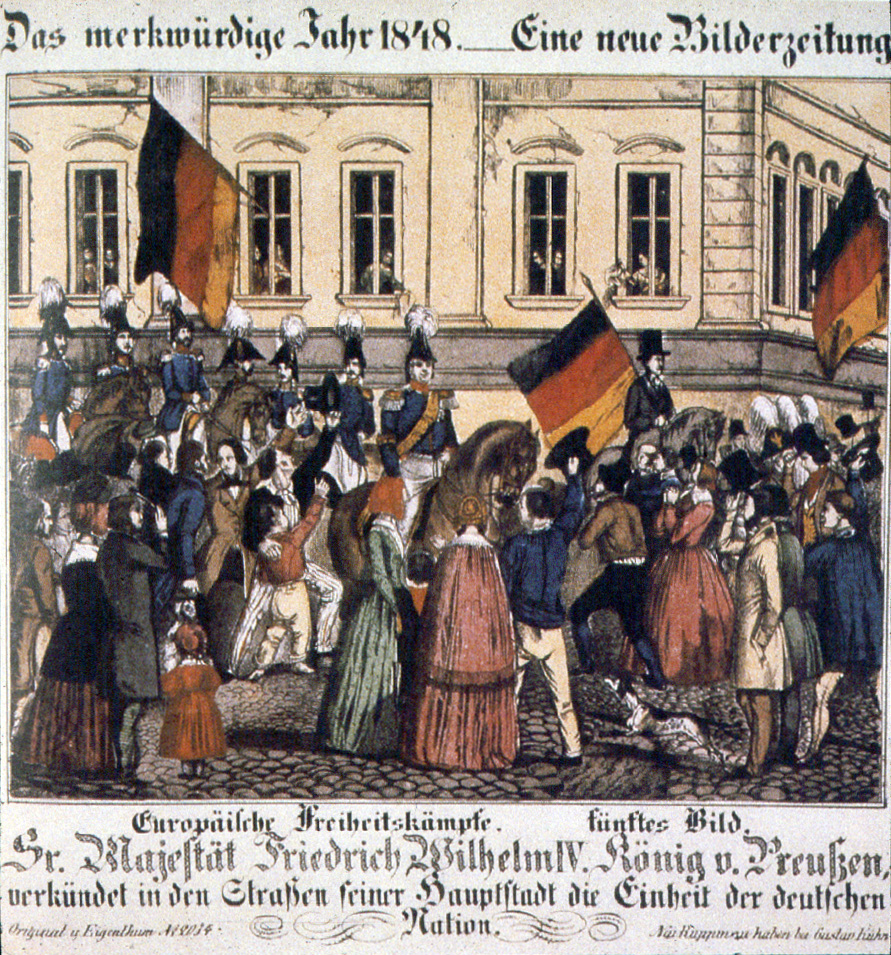
Frederick William IV riding through the streets of Berlin on 21 March 1848. The caption reads "His Majesty Frederick William IV of Prussia in the streets of his capital proclaims the unity of the German nation".

The next day he secretly wrote to his brother William: "I had to voluntarily raise the Reich colours yesterday in order to save everything. If the gamble is successful ... I will take them down again!"

On 29 March 1848, Frederick William appointed a liberal government led by Minister President Ludolf Camphausen and Finance Minister David Hansemann. The following day, the King founded a secret secondary cabinet, the ministre occulte, as a counter to Camphausen's government. The courtly interest group, which included General Leopold von Gerlach, his brother Ernst Ludwig von Gerlach and Count Anton of Stolberg-Wernigerode, talked the King out of his short-term plans to abdicate. Otto von Bismarck, the future chancellor of a united Germany, joined the group towards the end of 1848.

=== Prussian National Assembly and the Frankfurt Parliament ===
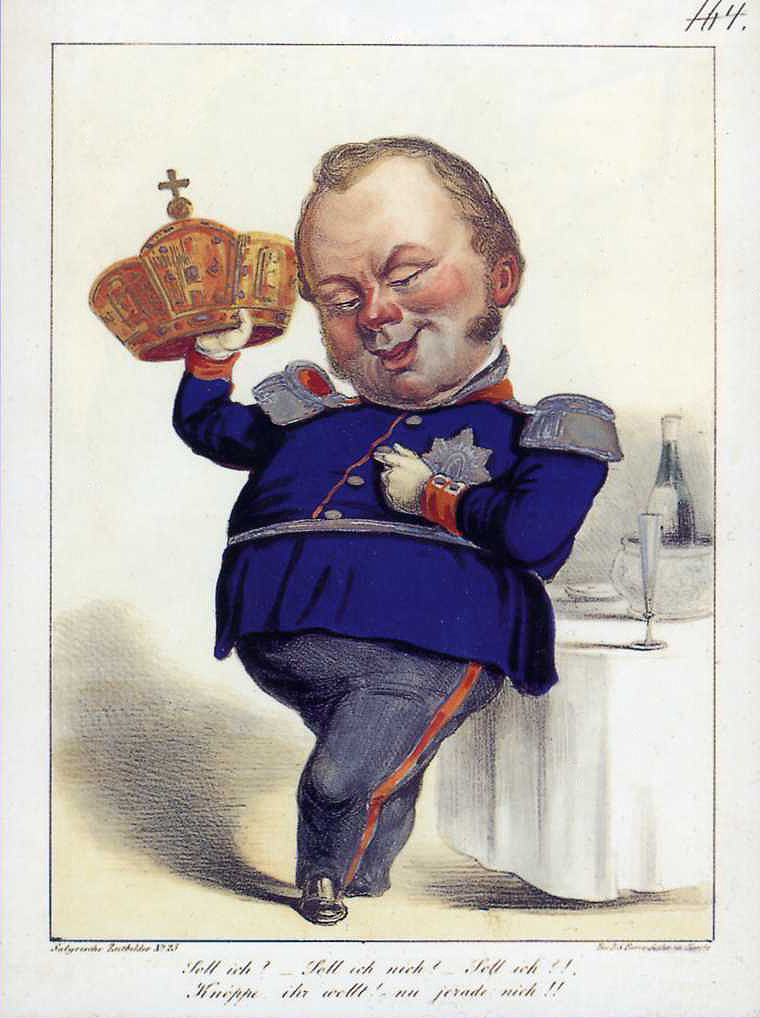
With the imperial crown offered to him by the parliamentarians of the Frankfurt National Assembly in hand, Prussian king Frederick William IV decides whether or not to accept it by counting off the buttons on his jacket: "Should I take it? Should I not? Should I?! Buttons, you want me to! Well, that's exactly why I won't!!", c. 1849

The second United Parliament called by Frederick William on 2 April 1848 announced elections to form a Prussian National Assembly, which convened in Berlin on 22 May. Frederick William IV submitted a draft constitution in which the balance of power continued to favour the king's dominant position in the state. It stipulated that the army and bureaucracy were answerable to the king and not the National Assembly. It also enshrined his view that he was "King by the grace of God" and that the constitution was merely an "agreement between the crown and the people".

At the beginning of April, a national pre-parliament sitting at Frankfurt-am-Main decided to work with the Federal Convention of the German Confederation to form a national constitutional assembly which would write a new constitution for the Confederation. Elections were held for it on 1 May 1848. Of the 379 members who attended the Frankfurt Parliament's first session on 18 May, 132 were from Prussia.

== Counter-revolution ==
=== End of the National Assembly and imposed constitution ===
The Prussian National Assembly rejected the Camphausen government's draft constitution on 20 June 1848. Left-wing forces then began to assert themselves more and more clearly. The words "by the grace of God" were removed from the draft on 12 October, openly calling into question the divine right of kings. The break with the crown culminated on 31 October when the Assembly abolished nobility, titles and privileges. Frederick William IV then launched a political counterattack. On 1 November he appointed his uncle Frederick William of Brandenburg, who came from the conservative military camp, as minister president of Prussia. Unlike previous minister presidents during the revolutionary period, Brandenburg was closer to the King than to the National Assembly. The National Assembly sent 25 deputies to the King on 2 November to protest against Brandenburg's appointment. He cancelled the audience after the deputies had read out their request.

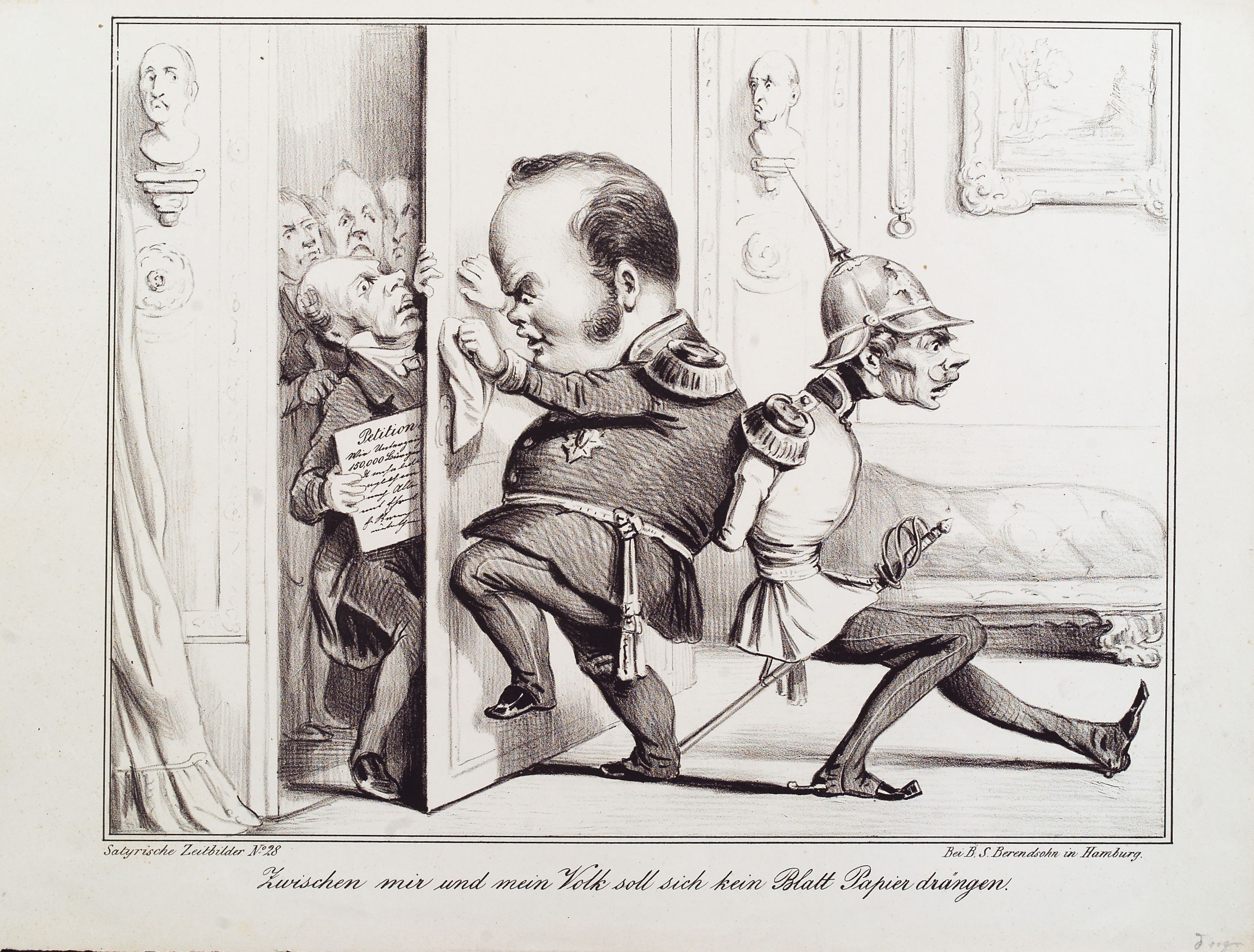
Caricature of Frederick William IV, helped by General von Wrangel, resisting the demands of the National Assembly for a constitution: "No sheet of paper shall come between me and my people." From Satyrische Zeitbilder #28, 1848

Under the pretext of removing the National Assembly from the pressure of the Berlin streets, the King told the deputies that they would be moved to Brandenburg an der Havel on 9 November and adjourned until 27 November. After the majority refused to comply, the King ordered General Friedrich von Wrangel to march through the Brandenburg Gate at the head of 13,000 soldiers and sixty guns. That Wrangel met with no resistance was due in part to the disillusionment of the craftsmen and industrial workers with the revolution. It had done nothing to change their economic hardship, which had led to isolated riots. Although the middle and upper classes sympathised with the workers, they did not want a violent social upheaval and sided with the King.

On 5 December the King dissolved the Prussian National Assembly and imposed the Constitution of 1848. Although Frederick William IV personally opposed the idea of introducing a constitution, the majority of his ministry urged him to take the step in order to prevent protests from flaring up again. The first Parliament of Prussia then modified the constitution with the King's cooperation, and on 31 January 1850, the Constitution of 1850 was promulgated. The Parliament had two chambers – an aristocratic upper house and a lower house elected by all male Prussians over 25 years of age using a three-class franchise that weighted votes based on the amount of taxes paid, with the result that the wealthy had far more influence than the poor. The constitution reserved to the king the power of appointing all ministers, re-established the conservative district assemblies and provincial diets and guaranteed that the civil service and the military remained firmly under control of the king. It also contained a number of liberal elements such as jury courts and a catalogue of fundamental rights that included freedom of religion, speech and the press. It was a more liberal system than had existed in Prussia before 1848, but it was still a conservative form of government in which the monarch, the aristocracy, and the military retained most of the power. The constitution of 1850 remained in effect, with numerous amendments, until the dissolution of the Prussian kingdom in 1918.

=== Refusal of the imperial title ===
Emperor Franz Joseph I of Austria had made it clear in November 1848 that he would not accept the title of "Emperor of the Germans" from the Frankfurt National Assembly because the Frankfurt Constitution would have required German-speaking Austria to have a separate constitution, government and administration from the rest of the Empire. On 28 March 1849, the Assembly elected Frederick William IV as Emperor of the Germans, but he refused the crown. In a letter to a confidant, he wrote: "I can call God to witness that I do not want it, for the simple reason that Austria will then be separated from Germany."

The exclusion of Austria would have ruined Frederick William IV's vision of the renewal of a Holy Roman Empire of the German Nation, of which Austria had been part for centuries. Accepting the imperial dignity would also have meant an open foreign policy snub of Austria and probably have provoked a war. Even more important was that, in the King's opinion, the imperial dignity could only be conferred by the princes or a college of electors, as had been the case until 1806. As a representative of the principle of monarchical legitimacy, he detested the idea of a unilateral taking of power that would have violated the historical rights of other German monarchs. The crown offered by representatives of the people was furthermore unacceptable to Frederick William, whose monarchical self-image was based on the traditional idea of divine right of kings and who rejected the idea of popular sovereignty. In a letter dated 13 December 1848, Frederick William stated to the Prussian ambassador to England, Christian Charles Josias von Bunsen:

Such an imaginary hoop [the crown] baked from dirt and weeds – should a legitimate king of Prussia be pleased with it? [...] I tell you bluntly: If the thousand-year-old crown of the German nation, which has been dormant for 42 years, is to be awarded once again, it is I and those like me who will award it.

=== The Erfurt Union ===
March/April 1850: states that had delegates elected to the Erfurt Parliament (yellow), states part of the Four Kings Alliance (dark red)

King Frederick Augustus II of Saxony provoked an uprising in Dresden in May 1849 by refusing to accept the Frankfurt Constitution. He wrote a letter to the Prussian king urging him to put down the uprising by force. On 5 May 1849, Frederick William sent Prussian troops to Dresden under Colonel Friedrich von Waldersee, who took control of the city on 9 May. Seven hundred revolutionaries were taken prisoner and 250 killed in the fighting. The suppression of the uprising in Saxony strengthened Prussia's negotiating position in its attempt to establish a united German federal state of princes under Prussian leadership.

The basis for the union was the Three Kings' Alliance of 26 May 1849 between Prussia, the Kingdom of Saxony and the Kingdom of Hanover. The three monarchs committed themselves for a period of one year to work together to realise a conservative imperial constitution based on the Prussian three-class electoral system. Ernst August I of Hanover and Friedrich August II of Saxony, however, only heeded the King's request while absolutist Austria was tied up with uprisings in Hungary.

Since eight individual German states, including the Kingdom of Bavaria and the Kingdom of Württemberg, did not participate in the Erfurt Union from the outset, Frederick William IV began to lose interest in the project. By the winter of 1849, the Kingdoms of Hanover and Saxony had withdrawn their consent as well.

In contrast to Prussia, Austria wanted to restore the German Confederation and opposed Prussia's Erfurt Union plans. Saxony, Hanover, Bavaria and Württemberg sided with Austria in the Four Kings' Alliance. With the backing of the conservative opponents of the Erfurt Union in the Prussian government, Austria was able to revive the German Confederation, which had been inactive since the 1848 revolutions. In the Punctation of Olmütz, Prussia declared its willingness to return to the German Confederation without Austria having assured it of legal equality in the leadership of the Confederation.

== Other political events ==
In addition to the 1848 revolution and the constitutional question that dominated Frederick William IV's reign, there were a number of other notable political events during his time on the throne:

- The Rhine Crisis of 1840 arose when French Prime Minister Adolphe Thiers demanded that the Rhine be reinstated as France's eastern border. The ensuing diplomatic crisis stoked German nationalism and led the German Confederation to improve its defences in the west. The tension ended when Thiers resigned.
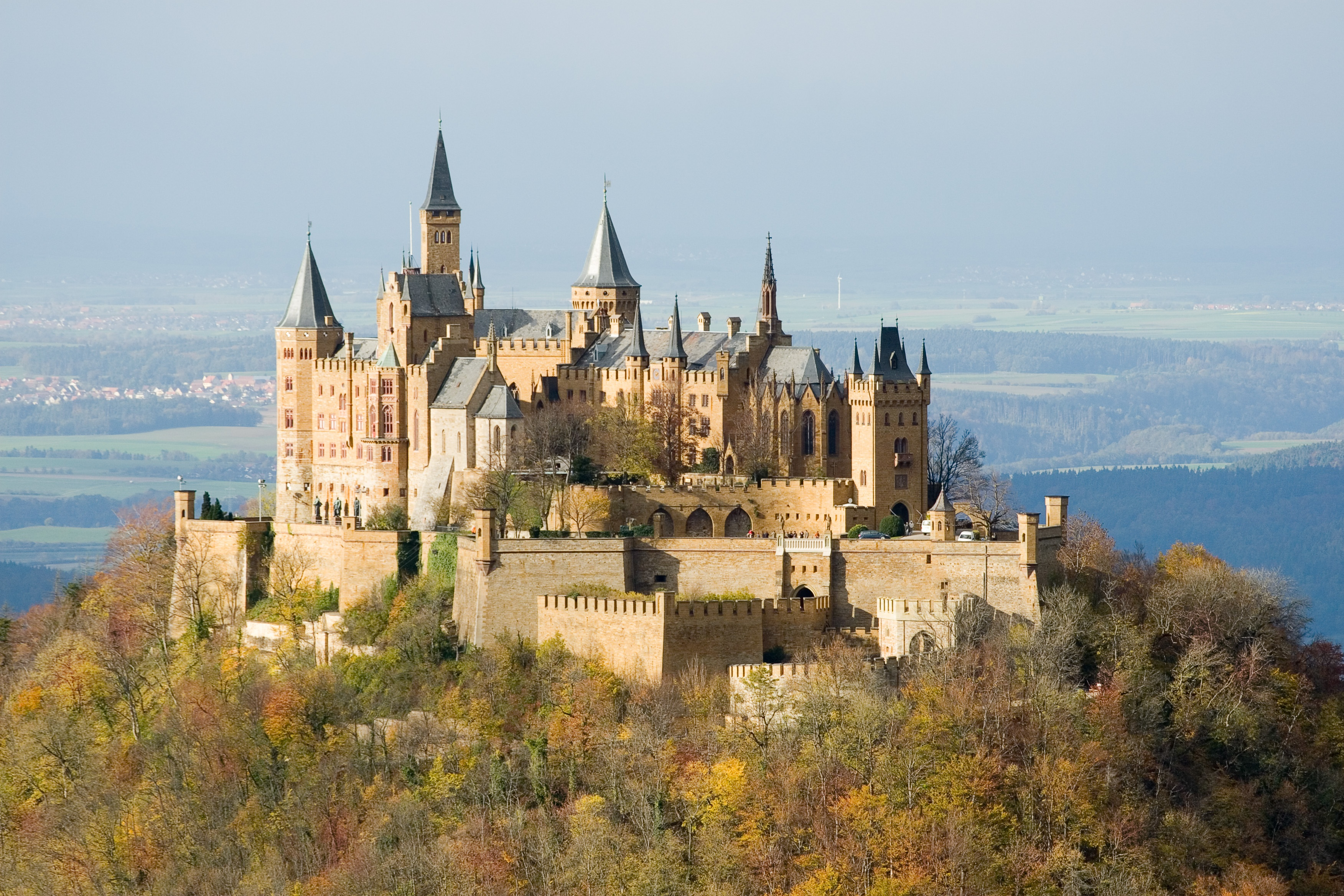
  The Hohenzollern Castle in the Province of Hohenzollern. Its construction between 1846 and 1867 was begun by Friedrich Wilhelm IV on the site of the family's two earlier castles.
- The First Schleswig War in 1848 was a conflict between German forces and Denmark over control of Schleswig and Holstein. Prussia led troops into Denmark but had to back down under pressure from the European great powers.
- The Province of Hohenzollern in southern Germany, the ancestral home of the Hohenzollerns, was created and annexed to Prussia in 1850.
- In the Jade Treaty of 1853, Prussia, which until then had had access to the sea only on the Baltic, purchased land on the North Sea, where the city of Wilhelmshaven was built.
- The Neuchâtel Crisis (1856–1857) was dispute over control of the Principality of Neuchâtel in the Swiss Confederation that led to Prussia cede its historic claim.

== Later years ==
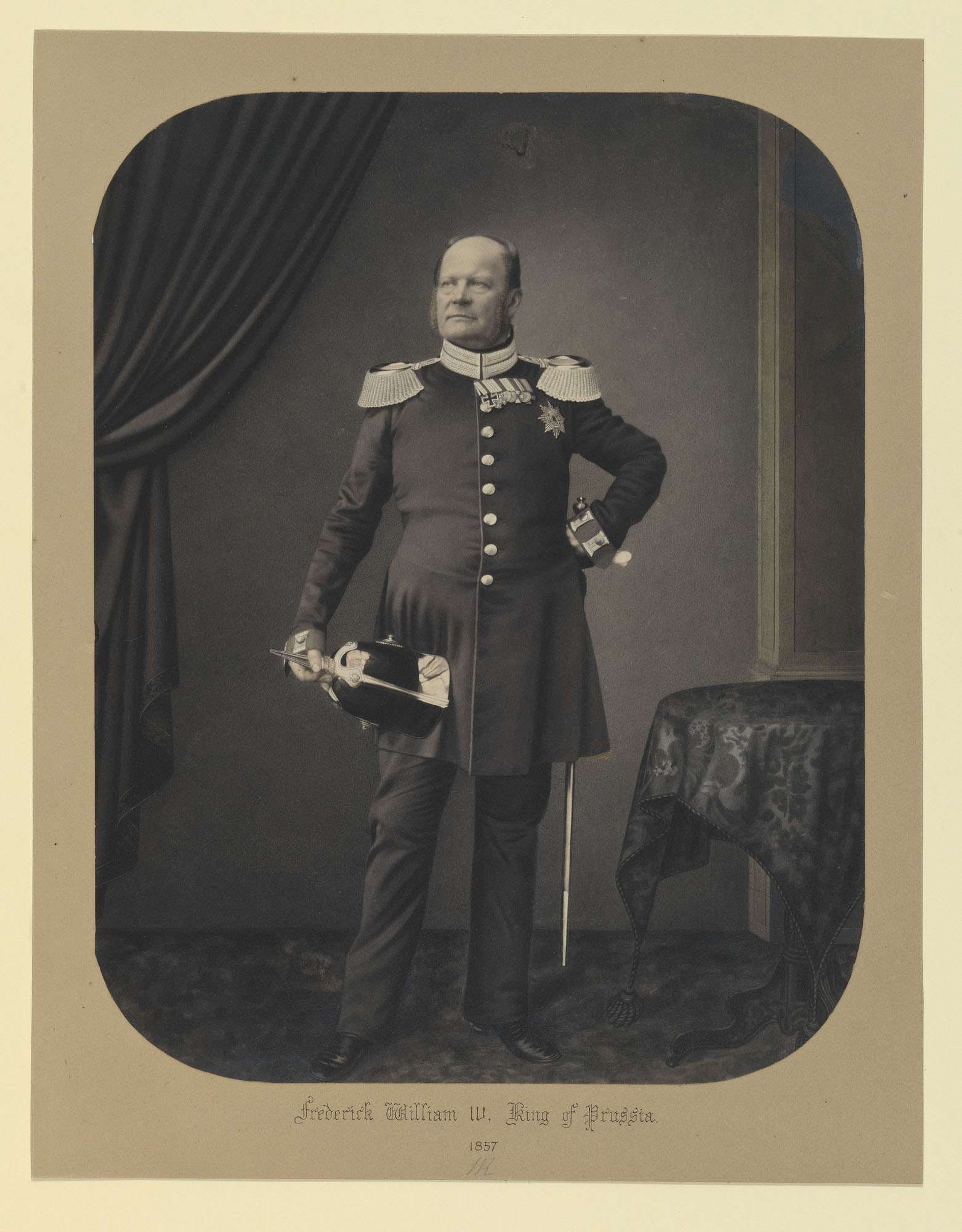
Photograph of Frederick William IV, c. 1857

In his final years, the King was affected by a serious illness, the symptoms of which, from the perspective of the medical knowledge of the era, appeared to be a "mental illness". According to current medical knowledge, Friedrich Wilhelm suffered from a "cerebral vascular disease", a "cerebral arteriosclerosis", which "could not be described as a mental illness". It is likely that psychopathological abnormalities occurred before the strokes he suffered, making him barely able to perform his government offices.

The strokes, which began on 14 July 1857, affected his speech centre. After Prince William's term acting as deputy for the King had been extended three times, the ailing Frederick William signed a regency charter for him on 7 October 1858, based on an expert opinion from the royal personal physicians. The charter included the formal possibility of a resumption of official duties.

The signing of the Regency Charter heralded the New Era in Prussia, marking the end of Frederick William IV's idea of government. Prince Regent William dismissed the reactionary minister president Otto Theodor von Manteuffel and recruited Karl Anton von Hohenzollern-Sigmaringen from the liberal-nationalist camp. He also dismissed the courtiers who had belonged to Frederick William IV's camarilla.

=== Death and burial ===
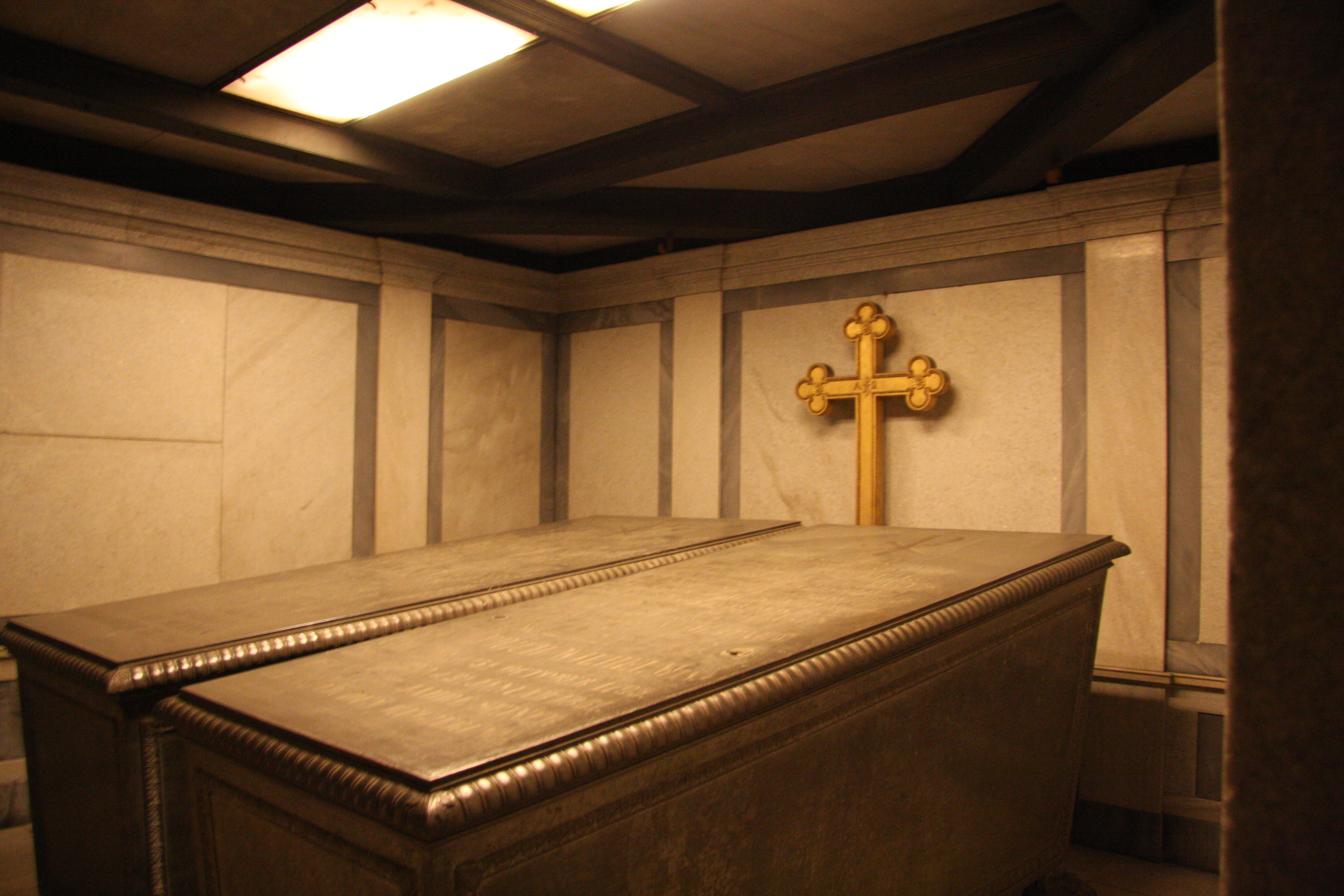
The crypt containing the sarcophagi of Frederick William IV and his wife Elisabeth in the Church of Peace, Sanssouci Park in Potsdam

On 24 November 1859, the king suffered a stroke that paralysed his left side. Since he was no longer able to be transported, the court remained at Sanssouci. On 4 November 1860, he lost consciousness after another stroke, and on 2 January 1861 he died. In accordance with his testamentary instructions from 1854, the King was buried in the Friedenskirche in Potsdam after his heart had been removed and buried separately alongside his parents in the mausoleum in Charlottenburg Palace Park.

== Honours ==
German decorations

- Prussia:
  - Knight of the Black Eagle, 15 October 1805
  - Iron Cross, 2nd Class
  - Service Award Cross
- Ascanian duchies: Grand Cross of Albert the Bear, 18 May 1838
- Baden:
  - Grand Cross of the House Order of Fidelity, 1830
  - Grand Cross of the Zähringer Lion, 1830
- Bavaria: Knight of St. Hubert, 1823
- Brunswick: Grand Cross of Henry the Lion
- (Saxe-Coburg and Gotha) (Duchy of Saxe-Altenburg) (Saxe-Meiningen) Ernestine duchies: Grand Cross of the Saxe-Ernestine House Order, October 1838
- Hanover:
  - Grand Cross of the Royal Guelphic Order, 1826
  - Knight of St. George, 1839
- Hesse and by Rhine: Grand Cross of the Ludwig Order, 11 April 1830
- Hesse-Kassel: Grand Cross of the Golden Lion, 5 September 1841
- (Hohenzollern-Sigmaringen) Hohenzollern: Cross of Honour of the Princely House Order of Hohenzollern, 1st Class
- Nassau: Knight of the Gold Lion of Nassau, May 1858
- Oldenburg: Grand Cross of the Order of Duke Peter Friedrich Ludwig, with Golden Crown, 8 October 1843
- Saxe-Weimar-Eisenach: Grand Cross of the White Falcon, 16 February 1829
- Saxony: Knight of the Rue Crown, 1839
- Württemberg: Grand Cross of the Civil Merit Order, 1818

Foreign decorations

- Austrian Empire: Grand Cross of St. Stephen, 1833
- Belgium: Grand Cordon of the Order of Leopold, 18 January 1850
- Denmark: Knight of the Elephant, 19 January 1840
- France:
  - Kingdom of France:
    - Knight of the Holy Spirit, 5 February 1824
    - Knight of St. Michael, 5 February 1824
  - French Empire: Grand Cross of the Legion of Honour, November 1856
- Kingdom of Greece: Grand Cross of the Redeemer
- Netherlands:
  - Grand Cross of the Military William Order, 9 February 1842
  - Grand Cross of the Netherlands Lion
- Duchy of Parma: Senator Grand Cross of the Constantinian Order of St. George, with Collar, 1856
- Russian Empire:
  - Knight of St. Andrew, 15 September 1801
  - Knight of St. George, 4th Class
- Kingdom of Poland: Knight of the White Eagle, 1829
- Kingdom of Sardinia: Knight of the Annunciation, 9 October 1847
- Spain: Knight of the Golden Fleece, 10 February 1818
- Sweden: Knight of the Seraphim, 29 August 1811
- Two Sicilies:
  - Knight of St. Januarius
  - Grand Cross of St. Ferdinand and Merit
- United Kingdom: Knight of the Garter, 25 January 1842

== Ancestry ==
Ancestors of Frederick William IV

8. Prince Augustus William of Prussia
4. Frederick William II of Prussia
9. Duchess Luise of Brunswick-Wolfenbüttel
2. Frederick William III of Prussia
10. Louis IX, Landgrave of Hesse-Darmstadt
5. Princess Frederica Louisa of Hesse-Darmstadt
11. Countess Palatine Caroline of Zweibrücken
1. Frederick William IV of Prussia
12. Duke Charles Louis Frederick of Mecklenburg-Strelitz
6. Charles II, Grand Duke of Mecklenburg-Strelitz
13. Princess Elisabeth Albertine of Saxe-Hildburghausen
3. Duchess Louise of Mecklenburg-Strelitz
14. Prince George William of Hesse-Darmstadt
7. Princess Friederike of Hesse-Darmstadt
15. Countess Maria Louise Albertine of Leiningen-Dagsburg-Falkenburg

Frederick William IV House of Hohenzollern Born: 15 October 1795 Died: 2 January 1861
Regnal titles
Preceded by Frederick William III	King of Prussia; 7 June 1840 – 2 January 1861	Succeeded by William I
Preceded by Frederick William III	Grand Duke of Posen; 7 June 1840 – 5 December 1848	Annexed to Prussia
Preceded by Frederick William III	Prince of Neuchâtel; 7 June 1840 – 26 May 1857	Neuchâtel Crisis
