= Four Kings' Alliance =

Treaty from 1850

- March / April 1850: in yellow those states that elected members of the German Parliament. In red the states of the Four Kings' Alliance.
- Type: Alliance
- Context: Prussia's effort to create a federal state in Germany without Austria
- Signed: February 27, 1850
- Signatories: Bavaria, Saxony, Hanover and Württemberg
- Language: German

The Four Kings' AllianceGerman Vierkönigsbündnis of February 27, 1850, was an alliance between Bavaria, Saxony, Hanover and Württemberg. These four kingdoms, under the influence of Austria, supported essentially the Austrian plan of a Greater Austria (Großösterreich): a German Confederation with all of Austria as a member, including a customs union. But they wanted to enrich the German Confederation with more power and institutions than Austria initially had planned.

The background was Prussia's effort to create a federal state in Germany without Austria (kleindeutscher Bundesstaat). This so-called Erfurt Union would have been, given the present situation, limited mostly to Northern Germany. The four kingdoms wanted to answer this Prussian effort with a counter proposal, in order to reform the German Confederation. Finally, both efforts failed, and in 1851 the old German Confederation was fully re-established.

The paper of the four kingdoms wanted to expand the purpose of the confederation to unify the technical-administrative infrastructure of Germany, with regard to customs, measures and weights, the railway, post services etc. Also, it foresaw the installation of several distinct organs in place of the old Bundestag: a federal government, a federal court and also a 'national representation'. The latter was not supposed to be a directly elected parliament but an organ that represented the states' parliaments.

== Sources ==
- Nr. 179. Übereinkunft zwischen Bayern, Sachsen und Württemberg über die Hauptgrundsätze für eine Revision der Bundesverfassung vom 27. Februar 1850. In: Ernst Rudolf Huber: Dokumente zur deutschen Verfassungsgeschichte. Vol. 1: Deutsche Verfassungsdokumente 1803-1850. W. Kohlkammer Verlag, Stuttgart, 1961, pp. 444–446
