= List of Illuminati members =

The following list of Illuminati members is a compilation of well-known personalities associated with the Illuminati, an 18th-century Bavarian secret society. The list is in alphabetical order.

The Illuminati Order was founded on May 1, 1776, by the philosopher and canon lawyer Adam Weishaupt in Ingolstadt and existed primarily in the Electorate of Bavaria until it was banned in 1784/85. The secret society had set itself the goal of spreading the values of the Enlightenment and infiltrated the lodges of the Freemasons for this purpose. A total of 1,395 members of the order can be identified, around a third of whom were also Freemasons and came almost exclusively from the German-speaking world (particularly Bavaria and Thuringia). The members included members of the upper classes, including nobles, entrepreneurs, scholars, intellectuals, military personnel, and civil servants. After a brief heyday, the Illuminati where banned in Bavaria in 1784/85 as treasonous and anti-religious, and by the 1790s at the latest, it was largely inactive. Although hardly any French-speaking people belonged to the Illuminati, conspiracy theories later arose that suspected the group of being behind the French Revolution.

== List ==
=== A ===
- Jakob Friedrich von Abel (1751–1829), German philosopher
- Werner Hans Friedrich Abrahamson (1744–1812), Danish officer, writer, editor, and translator
- Johann Michael Afsprung (1748–1808), German teacher, publicist, and Helvetian
- Franz Joseph von Albini (1748–1816), German politician and statesman
- Bonaventura Andres (1743–1822), German religious order priest, educator, university lecturer, and author
- Ferdinand d' Antoine (1746–1793), German composer
- August of Saxe-Gotha-Altenburg (1747–1806), Prince of Saxe-Gotha-Altenburg
- Karl August, Grand Duke of Saxe-Weimar-Eisenach (1757–1828), Grand Duke of Saxe-Weimar-Eisenach

=== B ===
- Ferdinand Maria von Baader (1749–1797), German physician, philosopher, and natural scientist
- Konrad Joseph Bachem (1755–1832), German lawyer, court chamber secretary
- Jens Immanuel Baggesen (1764–1826), Danish writer
- Heinrich Bansi (1754–1835), Swiss Reformed pastor
- Johann Friedrich Baring (1747–1808), German member of the Baring family
- Carl Anton von Barth (1758–1797), German lawyer and mayor of Munich
- Aloys Basselet von La Rosée (1747–1826), German civil servant and judge
- Ludwig Wilhelm von Baumbach (1755–1811), German landowner and member of parliament
- August Batsch (1761–1802), German naturalist
- Rudolph Zacharias Becker (1752–1822), German author, enlightenment philosopher, and theologian
- Georg Wilhelm Sigismund Beigel (1753–1837), German lawyer
- Johann Joachim Bellermann (1754–1842), German theologian and author
- Anselm Franz von Bentzel-Sternau (1738–1786), minister of Kurmainz, curator and reorganizer of the old University of Mainz
- Johannes Bering (1748–1825), philosopher
- Friedrich Wilhelm Ludwig von Beulwitz (1755–1829), German lawyer and chancellor
- Andrea Giorgio Maria Bianchi (1746–1814), Italian merchant and patron
- Siegmund von Bibra (1750–1803), German educator and lexicographer
- Traugott Andreas von Biedermann (1743–1814), German politician and legal scholar
- Johann Erich Biester (1749–1816), German philosopher
- Leopold Bleibtreu (1777–1839), mining entrepreneur
- Aloys Blumauer (1755–1798), Austrian poet
- Johann Elert Bode (1747–1826), German astronomer (believed to be in the Illuminati)
- Johann Joachim Christoph Bode (1731–1793), German translator and enlightenment philosopher
- Johann von Böber (1746–1820), German teacher, explorer, botanist, and entomologist
- Johann Michael Boeck (1743–1793), German actor
- Andreas Böhm (1720–1790), German philosopher
- Karl Böttiger (1760–1835), German archaeologist
- Ignaz von Born (1742–1791), Austrian mineralogist, geologist, and malacologist
- Nikolaus Joseph Brahm (1751–1812), German lawyer and entomologist
- Johann Friedrich Brandis (1760–1790), German lawyer and university professor
- Dominikus von Brentano (1740–1797), Swiss publicist, Enlightenment theologian, and Bible translator
- Franz Xaver Bronner (1758–1850), Swiss publicist and archivist
- Anton von Bucher (1746–1817), German theologian, writer, satirist, and school reformer
- Philipp Ludwig Bunsen (1760–1809), German writer and librarian
- Philippe Buonarroti (1761–1837), Italian-French writer, philosopher and early socialist (possible member of an Illluminati lodge in Florence)
- Wilhelm Christian von dem Bussche (1756–1817), German landowner and district administrator
- Hans Ernst Bütemeister (1750–1827), German civil servant
- Josef Ignác Buček (1740–1821), Bohemian university professor, author of works on economics

=== C ===
- Johann Vincenz Caemmerer (1761–1817), German lawyer, comedy writer, and publicist
- Joachim Heinrich Campe (1746–1818), German writer, linguist, educator and publisher.
- Emmanuel von Canal (1745–1826), Bohemian philanthropist, botanist, musician
- Christian Cannabich (1731–1798), German violinist, kapellmeister, and composer
- Prince Christian of Hesse-Darmstadt (1763–1830), Landgrave of the House of Hesse-Darmstadt and Dutch general
- Prince Charles of Hesse-Kassel (1744–1836), German-Danish prince and general
- Frederick Christian II. (1765–1814), Duke of Schleswig-Holstein-Sonderburg-Augustenburg
- Johann Rudolph Chotek von Chotkow (1748–1824), Austrian Minister of Finance and Governor of Bohemia
- Johann Philipp Count Cobenzl (1741–1810), Austrian statesman
- Hieronymus von Colloredo (1732–1812), Archbishop of Salzburg
- Friedrich Wilhelm Compe (1751–1827), German-Danish bailiff
- Prince Frederick Ferdinand Constantin of Saxe-Weimar-Eisenach (1758–1793), Duke of Saxe-Weimar-Eisenach and a major general in the army of the Electorate of Saxony
- Ignaz Cornova (1740–1822), Italian Jesuit priest, historian, educator, and poet

=== D ===
- Karl Theodor von Dalberg (1744–1817), German statesman and prince-bishop. Last archbishop and elector of Mainz and the last archchancellor of the Holy Roman Empire
- Wolfgang Heribert von Dalberg (1750–1806), German administrative official, director of the National Theater in Mannheim
- Heinrich Gottfried Wilhelm Daniels (1754–1827), German lawyer
- Matthias Dannenmayer (1744–1805), German church historian
- Joseph Friedrich August Darbes (1747–1810), German portrait painter
- Hermann Christoph Gottfried Demme (1760–1822), German writer
- Thaddäus Anton Dereser (1757–1827), German theologian
- Johann Georg von Dillis (1759–1841), German painter
- Franz Dietrich von Ditfurth (1738–1813), German lawyer and freemason
- Anton Joseph Dorsch (1758–1819), German university lecturer and revolutionary
- Friedrich Ferdinand Drück (1754–1807), German philologist

=== E ===
- Josef Karl Theodor von Eberstein (1761–1833), German politician
- Karl von Eckartshausen (1752–1803), German writer, alchemist, esotericist, and philosopher
- Johann Christian Ehrmann (1749–1827), German physician, author, and satirist
- Johann Peter Eichhoff (1755–1825), German Enlightenment philosopher and publicist
- Rudolf Eickemeyer (1753–1825), German engineer, mathematician, and general of the French Revolutionary Wars
- Carl Georg Riedesel zu Eisenbach (1746–1819), Hessian politician
- Wilhelm Christoph Eisenhuth (1755–1826), German lawyer and civil servant
- Adolf von Ende (1760–1816), German lawyer
- Ernest II (1745–1804), Duke of Saxe-Gotha-Altenburg
- Johann Joachim Eschenburg (1743–1820), German critic and literary historian
- Johann Christian Ludwig von Eschwege (1746–1798), father of Wilhelm Ludwig von Eschwege
- Anton Estner (1730–1801), German priest
- Schack Hermann Ewald (1745–1822), German court official and publicist
- Joseph Valentin Eybel (1741–1805), Austrian publicist

=== F ===
- Ernst Friedrich Hektor Falcke (1751–1809), mayor of Hanover
- Bernhard Christoph Faust (1755–1842), German physician
- Johann Noë du Fay (1748–1820), German merchant and co-founder of the Frankfurt Chamber of Commerce
- Ferdinand Fechtig von Fechtenberg (1756–1837), lawyer and Austrian civil servant
- Johann Georg Heinrich Feder (1740–1821), German philosopher
- Ferdinand of Braunschweig-Wolfenbüttel (1721-1792), Prussian field marshal
- Pascal Joseph von Ferro (1753–1809), Austrian physician
- Johann Friedrich Flatt (1759–1821), German Protestant theologian and philosopher
- Carl Chassot de Florencourt (1756–1790), German mathematician and mining engineer
- Mathias von Flurl (1756–1823), pioneer of geology and mineralogy in Bavaria
- Peter Anton von Frank (1746–1818), German legal scholar, historian, and university professor
- Joseph Maria von Fraunberg (1768–1842), Bishop of Augsburg and Archbishop of Bamberg
- Junius Frey (1753–1794), Czech writer, poet and revolutionary, relative of Jacob Frank
- Frederick V. (1748–1820), Landgrave of Hesse-Homburg
- Ludwig Fronhofer (1746–1800), German educator and writer

=== G ===
- Caspar Siegfried Gähler (1747–1825), administrative lawyer and mayor of Altona
- Christian Garve (1742–1798), German philosopher
- Friedrich Gedike (1754 –1803), German theologian, teacher and educational reformer
- Franz Xaver Geiger (1749–1841), German writer and Roman Catholic clergyman
- Otto Heinrich von Gemmingen-Hornberg (1755–1836), German diplomat
- Johann Friedrich Gildemeister (1750–1812), German legal scholar
- Christoph Girtanner (1760–1800), Swiss physician, chemist, and historical-political writer
- Ernst August Anton von Göchhausen (1740–1824), German writer
- Leopold Friedrich Günther von Goeckingk (1748–1828), Rococo poet and Prussian civil servant
- Johann Wolfgang von Goethe (1749–1832), German poet, playwright, natural scientist, and politician
- Joseph Franz von Goez (1754–1815), Austrian painter
- Georg Friedrich Götz (1750–1813), German entomologist
- Tadeusz Grabianka (1740–1807), Polish alchemist
- Ernst Christoph Grattenauer (1744–1815), German bookseller and publisher
- Peter Wilhelm Josef de Gynetti (1735–1804), German physician

=== H ===
- Franz Xaver von Haeberl (1759–1846), German physician
- Benedikt Hacker (1769–1829), Austrian composer and music publisher
- Johann Casimir Häffelin (1737–1827), German diplomat and cardinal
- Gerhard Anton von Halem (1752–1819), German writer, lawyer, and civil servant
- Jan Alois Hanke (1751–1806), Moravian Enlightenment philosopher, historian, writer, and humanist
- Karl August von Hardenberg (1750–1822), Prussian statesman and reformer
- Lorenz Leopold Haschka (1749–1827), Austrian poet and author
- Johann Matthäus Hassencamp (1743–1797), German theologian, orientalist, and mathematician
- Gottfried Konrad Hecht (1752–1816), German civil servant and botanist
- Christian Georg von Helmolt (1728–1805), German civil servant
- Ludwig von Helmolt (1769–1847), Prussian district administrator
- Johann Wilhelm Hemeling (1758–1817), German librarian, teacher, and teacher of the deaf and dumb
- Johann Gottfried Herder (1744–1803), German writer, translator, theologian, and philosopher
- Carl Wilhelm Hilchenbach (1749–1816), German theologian
- Aloys Friedrich Wilhelm von Hillesheim (1756–1818), German economist and publicist
- Johann Daniel Hoffmann (1743–1814), German jurist and university lecturer
- Leopold Alois Hoffmann (1760–1806), Austrian publicist and playwright
- Caspar Friedrich von Hofmann (1740–1814), procurator at the Imperial Chamber Court
- Andreas Joseph Hofmann (1752–1849), philosopher and revolutionary
- Johann Konrad Achaz Holscher (1755–1840), Lutheran theologian
- Carl Alexander Holtzmann (1759–1820), merchant, mayor, and administrative councilor
- Johann Wilhelm von Hompesch zu Bolheim (1761–1809), Bavarian Minister of Finance
- August Ludwig Hoppenstedt (1763–1830), Lutheran theologian
- Johann Baptist Horix (1730–1792), German lawyer, constitutional law scholar and civil servant
- Franz Xaver Huber (1755–1814), Austrian journalist, satirist and librettist
- Gottlieb Hufeland (1760–1817), legal scholar
- Christoph Wilhelm Hufeland (1762–1836), German physician and naturopath, founder of macrobiotics
- Adolph Carl von Humbracht (1753–1837), patrician and politician

=== I ===
- Isaak Iselin (1728–1782), Swiss philosopher of history

=== J ===
- Friedrich Heinrich Jacobi (1743–1819), philosopher, economic reformer, merchant, and writer
- Peter Jordan (1751–1827), Austrian agricultural scientist

=== K ===
- Johann Friedrich Kästner (1749–1812), Civil servant
- Franz Wilhelm Kauhlen (1750–1793), physician and chemist
- Wenzel Anton, Prince of Kaunitz-Rietberg (1711–1794), Austrian statesman and reformer
- Franz Xaver von Kesaer (1740–1804), Austrian mathematician, university professor, and clergyman
- Edmund von Kesselstatt (1765–1840), Roman Catholic clergyman
- Georg August Heinrich von Kinckel (1741–1827), Royal Bavarian Chamberlain and Lieutenant General
- Franz Joseph, Count Kinsky (1739–1805), Austrian general in the War of the Bavarian Succession and in the Coalition Wars
- Johann Friedrich Kleuker (1749–1827), high school and university teacher
- Adolph Knigge (1752–1796), German writer and researcher
- Sebastian Knorr (1752–1791), lawyer
- Gregor Köhler (1733–1815), Benedictine monk and theologian
- Joseph Hieronymus Karl Kolborn (1744–1816), statesman and auxiliary bishop
- Leopold von Kolowrat-Krakowsky (1727–1809), Austrian major general, lieutenant field marshal, and governor.
- Vincenz Maria von Kolowrat-Liebsteinsky (1750–1824), Austrian field marshal during the Coalition Wars and Grand Prior of the Knights Hospitaller
- Johann Benjamin Koppe (1750–1791), Lutheran theologian
- Christian Gottfried Körner (1756–1831), writer and lawyer
- Ernst Traugott von Kortum (1742–1786), German-Austrian lawyer, civil servant, and politician
- Johann Nepomuk Gottfried von Krenner (1759–1812), legal historian and statesman
- Karl Friedrich von Kruse (1737–1806), court chamberlain and prime minister of Nassau-Usingen

=== L ===
- Karl Heinrich von Lang (1764–1835), historian and publicist
- Karl Gotthold Lenz (1763–1809), classical philologist, ancient historian, numismatist and high school teacher
- Gottlieb Leon (1757–1830), Austrian writer and librarian
- Johann Peter von Leonhardi (1747–1830), Frankfurt merchant, landowner, and politician
- Franz Michael Leuchsenring (1746–1827), writer
- Karl Lichnowsky (1761–1814), chamberlain at the imperial court in Vienna
- Daniel Lienau (1739–1816), senator and mayor of Hamburg
- Justus Christian Loder (1753–1832), anatomist, surgeon, personal physician to Tsar Alexander I
- Max von Lodron (1757–1823), Bavarian nobleman and government official
- Peter von Loewenich (1755–1829), merchant
- Johann Gottfried Lohse (1740–1810), architect
- Louis I, Grand Duke of Hesse (1753–1830), Grand Duke of Hesse and by Rhine
- Joachim Friedrich Ernst von der Lühe (1748–1809), lawyer, captain, and educator
- Carl Wilhelm von Ludolf (1760–1803), Austrian diplomat and orientalist
- Wilhelm Lutteroth (1753–1821), merchant and politician
- Joseph Maximilian von Lütgendorf (1750–1829), German balloonist and aviation pioneer

=== M ===
- Franz Konrad Macké (1756–1844), mayor of French Mainz
- Ulrich Lebrecht von Mandelsloh (1760–1827), privy councilor and minister of state of the Kingdom of Württemberg
- August Dietrich Marschall (1750–1824), nobleman and Freemason
- Georg Friedrich von Martens (1756–1821), diplomat and publicist
- Emmanuele Mastelloni (1750–1835), lawyer, Minister of Justice and Police and Accounting Councillor in Naples, Kingdom of the Two Sicilies
- Jakob Mauvillon (1743–1794), Enlightenment philosopher, writer, constitutional lawyer, economist (representative of physiocracy), historian, translator, officer and engineer
- Ferdinand von Meggenhofen (1760–1790), Austrian civil servant
- Christoph Meiners (1747–1810), German philosopher
- August Gottlieb Meißner (1753–1807), German writer
- Ludwig August Mellin (1754–1835), German-Baltic nobleman and liberal politician, one of the most important Baltic cartographers of his time
- Friedrich Ernst Carl Mereau (1765–1825), German law teacher and judge
- Franz Georg Karl von Metternich (1746–1818), diplomat and minister
- Mathias Metternich (1758–1825), Mainz Jacobin, mathematician, university professor, politician, and publicist
- Johann Wilhelm Metzler (1755–1837), lawyer and politician, mayor of France
- Friedrich Ludwig Wilhelm Meyer (1759–1840), lawyer, scholar, librarian, publicist, and playwright
- Anton Michl (1753–1813), Catholic theologian and university professor
- Gilbert Michl (1750–1828), German Premonstratensian and composer, last abbot of Steingaden
- Johann Friedrich Mieg (1744–1819), Reformed preacher
- Honoré Gabriel Riqueti, comte de Mirabeau (1749–1791), French writer, orator and statesman and prominent figure of the early stages of the French Revolution (rumored to be a member of the Illuminati)
- Franz von Mückusch und Buchberg (1749–1837), Austrian natural scientist and botanist
- Daniel Gotthilf Moldenhawer (1753–1823), Danish Protestant theologian and librarian
- Maximilian von Montgelas (1759–1838), Bavarian statesman and reformer
- Theodor Heinrich Topor von Morawitzky (1735–1810), Bavarian Minister of Justice and Culture
- Johannes von Müller (1752–1809), Swiss historian, publicist, and statesman
- Gottlieb Franz Münter (1743–1816), German lawyer and cantor
- Friedrich Münter (1761–1830), German Protestant theologian
- Johann Daniel Heinrich Musäus (1749–1821), German jurist
- Johann Karl August Musäus (1735–1787), German author

=== N ===
- Christian Gottlob Neefe (1748–1798), German composer, organist, kapellmeister, and musicologist
- Friedrich Nicolai (1733–1811), German publisher and writer

=== O ===
- Franz Oberthür (1745–1831), German Roman Catholic theologian
- Dietrich Heinrich Ludwig von Ompteda (1746–1803), German constitutional lawyer and minister of Brunswick
- Johann Philipp Ostertag (1734–1801), German classical philologist and high school teacher
- Johann Georg Overbeck (1759–1819), German Protestant theologian

=== P ===
- Francesco Mario Pagano (1748–1799), Italian jurist and author
- Karl Hieronymus Pálffy von Erdőd (1735–1816), Hungarian politician
- Christian Ludwig Albrecht Patje (1748–1817), German civil servant and publicist
- Heinrich Paulizky (1752–1791), German physician and writer
- Johann Baptist Pahr (1756–1804), German architect
- Johann Nepomuk von Pelkhoven (1763–1830), Royal Bavarian District School Inspector and Government Councillor
- Josef Bernhard Pelzel (1745–1809), Austrian writer and civil servant
- Johann Heinrich Pestalozzi (1746–1827), Swiss educator
- Carlo Antonio Pilati (1733–1802), Italian lawyer and writer
- Joseph von Plenciz (1752–1785), Austrian physician and university lecturer
- József Podmaniczky von Aszód und Podmanin (1756–1823), Hungarian lawyer, politician, and patron of the arts
- Anton Podobnik (1755–1809), mayor of Ljubljana
- Alphons Gabriel von Porcia (1761–1835), Italian nobleman and Austrian civil servant
- Martin Joseph Prandstätter (1760–1798), Austrian Jacobin
- Johann Baptist Primisser (1739–1815), Austrian librarian, archaeologist, and museum expert

=== R ===
- Joseph Franz Ratschky (1757–1810), Austrian writer
- Heinrich August Ottokar Reichard (1751–1828), German librarian and writer
- Carl Leonhard Reinhold (1757–1823), Austrian philosopher and author
- Jeremias David Reuss (1750–1837), German philologist, literary historian, and librarian
- Cornelius Johann Rudolph Ridel (1759–1821), court tutor, prince's tutor, and privy chamberlain in Weimar
- Victor Heinrich Riecke (1759–1830), German Protestant clergyman
- Josef Anton von Riegger (1742–1795), German lawyer and historian
- Franz Anton Ries (1755–1846), German violinist
- Carl Wilhelm Robert (1740–1803), German theologian, lawyer, and Freemason
- Georg Robert (1765–1833), German lawyer, university lecturer, and politician
- Alexandre Roëttiers de Montaleau (1748–1808), French goldsmith, medalist, and Freemason
- Ludwig Roentgen (1755–1814), German Enlightenment theologian and writer
- Heinrich Franz von Rottenhan (1738–1809), Austrian civil servant
- Friedrich Josef Anton von Schreckenstein (1753–1808), Bavarian nobleman and local historian
- Karl Roth von Schreckenstein (1756–1826), Bavarian nobleman, heraldist, and historian
- Simon Rottmanner (1740–1813), German cameralist, agricultural reformer, lawyer, landowner, and author
- Joseph Claude Rougemont (1756–1818), German physician and university professor
- Johann Kaspar Ruef (1748–1825), German lawyer and librarian
- Georg Ernst von Rüling (1748–1807), German lawyer

=== S ===
- Joseph Ferdinand Maria von Salern (1718–1805), German military officer and general superintendent of court music
- Friedrich Rudolf Salzmann (1749–1820), French-Alsatian lawyer, legation councillor, bookseller and printer
- Franz Josef von Saurau (1760–1832), Austrian politician
- Josef Anton Sauter (1742–1817), German lawyer
- Charles-Pierre-Paul Savalette de Langes (1746–1797), captain of the French National Guard and aide to Lafayette
- Clemens August von Schall (1748–1814), German officer, politician, musician, and writer
- Ernst Carl Constantin von Schardt (1744–1833), German civil servant
- Ferdinand Schenck zu Schweinsberg (1765–1842), Minister of Justice of Kurhessen
- Swibert Burkhard Schiverek (1742–1806), German botanist and university lecturer
- Friedrich Schlichtegroll (1765–1822), German teacher and scholar
- Johann Georg Schlosser (1739–1799), German lawyer, statesman, and translator
- Ernst Friedrich von Schlotheim (1765–1832), geologist and paleontologist
- Carl Christian Erhard Schmid (1761–1812), theologian and philosopher
- Leopold Schönberg von Brenkenhoff (1749–1799), Prussian officer and military writer
- Friedrich Ludwig Schröder (1744–1816), actor, theater director, playwright, and Freemason
- Joachim Thomas Schuhbauer (1743–1812), Benedictine monk and educator
- Friedrich Wilhelm von Schütz (1756–1834), German publicist
- Joseph Anton von Seeau (1713–1799), Bavarian court music director
- Heinrich Philipp Sextro (1746–1838), German theologian
- Johann Christian Siebenkees (1753–1841), German poet and lawyer
- Georg Heinrich Sieveking (1751–1799), German merchant and Enlightenment philosopher
- Johann Friedrich Simon (1747–1829), French teacher, printer, and politician
- Basilius Sinner (1745–1827), Benedictine monk and inventor
- Johann Jakob Friedrich Sinnhold (1739–1805), German classical philologist, philosopher, university professor, and Freemason
- Franz Wilhelm von Spiegel (1752–1815), Westphalian nobleman and civil servant
- Johann Spieker (1756–1825), German pastor and Reformed theologian
- Ludwig Timotheus Spittler (1752–1810), German historian
- Anton Matthias Sprickmann (1749–1833), German writer and lawyer
- Volrath Friedrich Carl Ludwig zu Solms-Rödelheim und Assenheim, Imperial Count
- Friedrich Lothar von Stadion (1761–1811), Austrian diplomat
- Johann Philipp von Stadion (1763–1824), Austrian statesman
- Friedrich Leopold zu Stolberg-Stolberg (1750–1819), German lawyer and translator (believed to be member of the Illuminati)
- Heinrich Friedrich von Storch (1766–1835), German-Russian economist
- Maximilian Stoll (1742–1787), German-Austrian physician and university professor
- Johann Baptist Strobl (1748–1805), Bavarian publicist and publisher
- Andreas Stütz (1747–1806), Austrian mineralogist and geologist
- Heinrich David Stüve (1757–1813), lawyer and mayor of Osnabrück
- Martin Ernst von Styx (1759–1829), German-Baltic physician and university professor
- Lorenz Johann Daniel Suckow (1722–1801), German natural scientist and mathematician
- Johann Anton Sulzer (1752–1828), German theologian
- Gottfried van Swieten (1733–1803), Dutch-born Austrian diplomat, librarian, and government officia

=== T ===
- Donato Tommasi (1761–1831), Italian politician, Prime Minister of the Kingdom of the Two Sicilies
- Anton Clemens von Toerring-Seefeld (1725–1812), Bavarian nobleman and court chamberlain
- Ernst Christian Trapp (1745–1818), German educator
- Friedrich Wilhelm Heinrich von Trebra (1740–1819), Saxon chief mining administrator
- Johann Nepomuk von Triva (1755–1827), Bavarian general and minister of war
- Johann von Türckheim (1749–1824), French-German diplomat and genealogist

=== U ===
- Karel Rafael Ungar (1743–1807), Bohemian priest, historian, and scholar
- Joseph von Utzschneider (1763–1840), Bavarian civil servant, politician, manufacturer, entrepreneur, and mayor of Munich

=== V ===
- Franz Michael Vierthaler (1758–1827), Austrian pedagogue
- Christian Gottlob von Voigt (1743–1819), poet and minister in Saxe-Weimar-Eisenach
- Johann Ludwig Völkel (1762–1829), German classical archaeologist, librarian, and archivist

=== W ===
- Karl Eberhard von Wächter (1746–1825), lawyer, Württemberg civil servant and Minister of the Interior
- Philipp Franz Wilderich Nepomuk von Walderdorf (1739–1810), Prince-Bishop of Speyer
- Heinrich Joseph Watteroth (1757–1819), German-Austrian jurist and university professor
- Georg von Wedekind (1761–1831), German physician and revolutionary
- Adam Weishaupt (1748–1830), German author, university professor and philosopher, founder of the Illuminati
- Johann Adam Weiß (1751–1804), mayor of Speyer
- Joseph Maria Weissegger von Weißeneck (1755–1817), Austrian writer, historian, lawyer, philosopher, and translator
- Friedrich Alexander von Wenckstern (1755–1790), German lawyer and diplomat
- Benedikt Maria von Werkmeister (1745–1823), German Roman Catholic theologian and church reformer of the Enlightenment
- Friedrich August Clemens Werthes (1748–1817), German writer
- Lorenz von Westenrieder (1748–1829), German historian and writer
- Alexander von Westerholt (1765–1827), Bavarian statesman
- Arnold Wienholt (1749–1804), German physician
- Johann Josef von Wilczek (1738–1819), Austrian diplomat
- Johann Jakob Willemer (1760–1838), Frankfurt banker and author
- Philipp Ludwig Wittwer (1752–1792), German physician
- Georg Hartmann von Witzleben (1766–1841), Prussian civil servant
- Franz Xaver Woschitka (1744–1797), Austrian composer, cellist, violinist, and music teacher
- Johann Nepomuk von Wolf (1743–1829), Bishop of Regensburg

=== Y ===
- Ernst Carl Ludwig Ysenburg von Buri (1747–1806), German author

=== Z ===
- Franz Xaver von Zach (1754–1832), Austrian astronomer
- Andreas Dominikus Zaupser (1746–1795), Bavarian lawyer, writer, and enlightenment philosopher
- Franz von Zeiller (1751–1828), Austrian lawyer and rector of the University of Vienna
- Georg Friedrich von Zentner (1752–1835), Bavarian Minister of State
- Franz Xaver von Zwackh (1756–1843), Bavarian civil servant
- Christian Jacob von Zwierlein (1737–1793), German lawyer at the Imperial Chamber Court

== Sources ==
- The Gotha Illuminati Research Base of the University of Erfurt
