= Jenny Voigts =

German writer and editor (1749–1814)

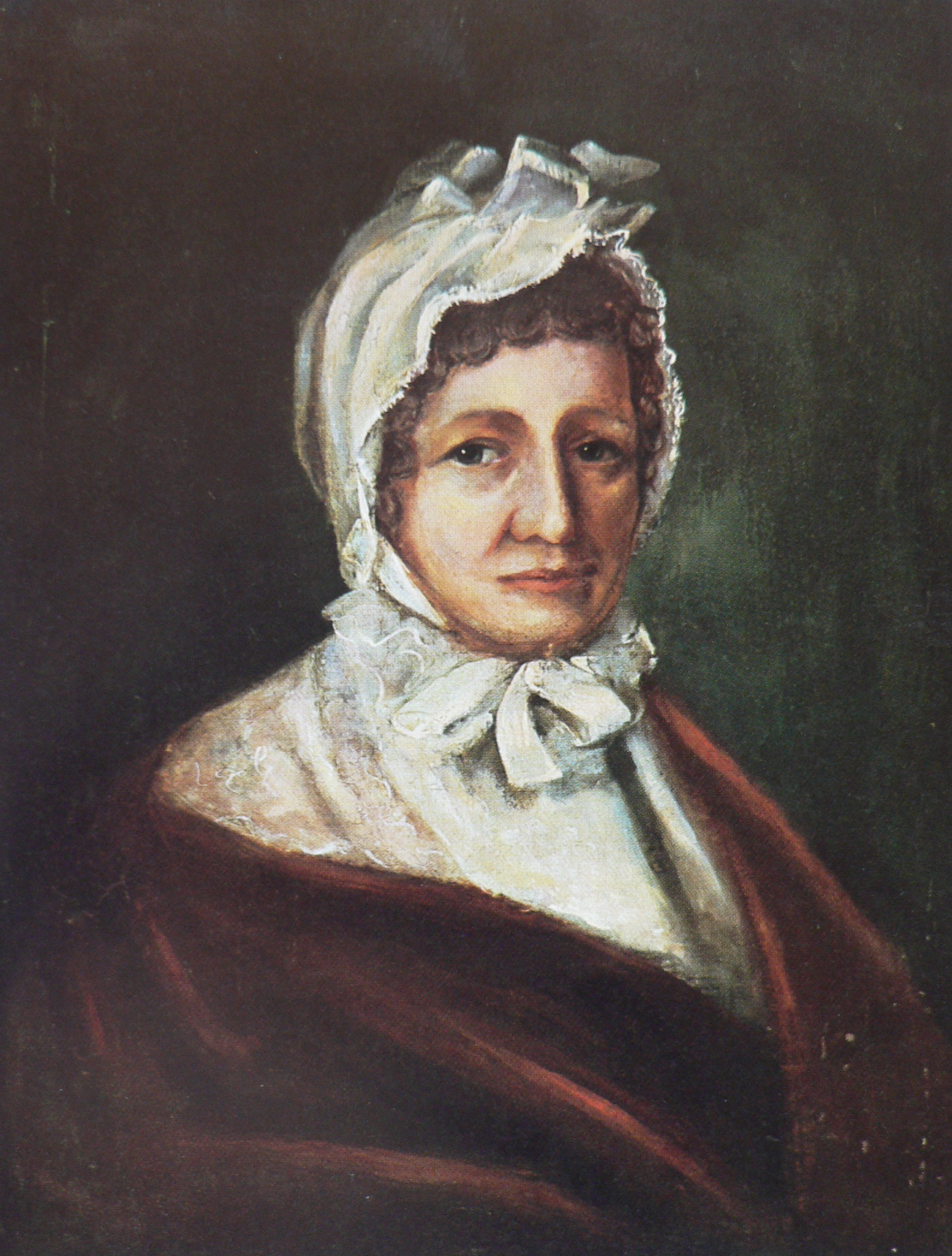
- Born: Jenny Möser; 5 June 1749; Osnabrück, Electorate of Saxony, Holy Roman Empire
- Died: 29 December 1814 (aged 65); Melle, Germany
- Occupation: Author
- Spouse: Johann Voigts (m. 1768; died 1797)
- Parents: Justus Möser (father); Regina Möser (mother)

Jenny Voigts (5 June 1749 – 29 December 1814) was a German writer and editor. She maintained numerous friendships with the intellectual and political elite of her time, including Johann Wolfgang von Goethe and Louise of Brandenburg-Schwedt.

== Life and work ==
Jenny Voigt's father was the Osnabrück Privy Counsellor Justus Möser, who was the regency for the Prince-Bishop of Osnabrück, Frederick, Duke of York and Albany, who was initially a minor and later constantly stayed abroad. Her mother was Regina Juliana Möser, née Brouning. Friedrich Nicolai, publisher and friend of the house, wrote of her: "... a rare woman, in spirit, heart and knowledge." The family belonged to the wealthy Osnabrück bourgeois families and lived in a spacious house in the Rococo style at Hakenstraße 10 in the center of Osnabrück. The Justus Möser secondary school was housed here until 2004. Neighbors were the von Bussche, von Nehem, von Morsey-Picard and von Stael-Wulften. Jenny's grandfather and great-grandfather were in the service of the Elector Ernst August of Hanover. Her great-great-grandfather had been mayor of Osnabrück.

Jenny had a brother who was one year younger than her. The Mösers later took two foster daughters into their home, Juliane von Lengerken and Friderike Friderici. The children grew up in the closed family circle. While the son was taught by a tutor, Jenny received lessons from her mother and a governess who was a friend of the family named Lindemann, who later became the wife of the Osnabrück lawyer Graff. In addition to her language training in English, Italian and French, she read English and French (Rousseau, Voltaire) works in the original. She also learned to play the piano.

In the summer of 1766, Jenny undertook a long trip to Braunschweig to visit her relative Abbot Jerusalem. She initially felt inhibited by the Jerusalems, "since I had a great deal of freedom in Osnabrück, I must be embarrassed here". New perspectives soon opened up for her, such as visiting the opera, which she found enriching.

Since 1763, she maintained a correspondence with the philosopher and historical-political writer Thomas Abbt, who had accepted the position of court and government councillor at the Schaumburg-Lippe court in Bückeburg. Original plans to marry Abbt were dashed by his early death on November 3, 1766. At the family's request, she became engaged in January 1768 and married on May 4 of the same year with Privy Councillor Johann Gerlach Jost von Voigts (1741–1797) from Celle. Voigts initially became director of the newly founded Osnabrück lottery through the mediation of Justus Möser and was given the title of councillor. In 1776, he was appointed forestry commissioner. Since her marriage, Jenny and her husband lived on the family property, the Haus vor Melle estate, which was located north of the center of Melle in front of the city gate. She soon found the childless marriage a burden, but accepted her fate by taking in foster children and financing their upbringing.

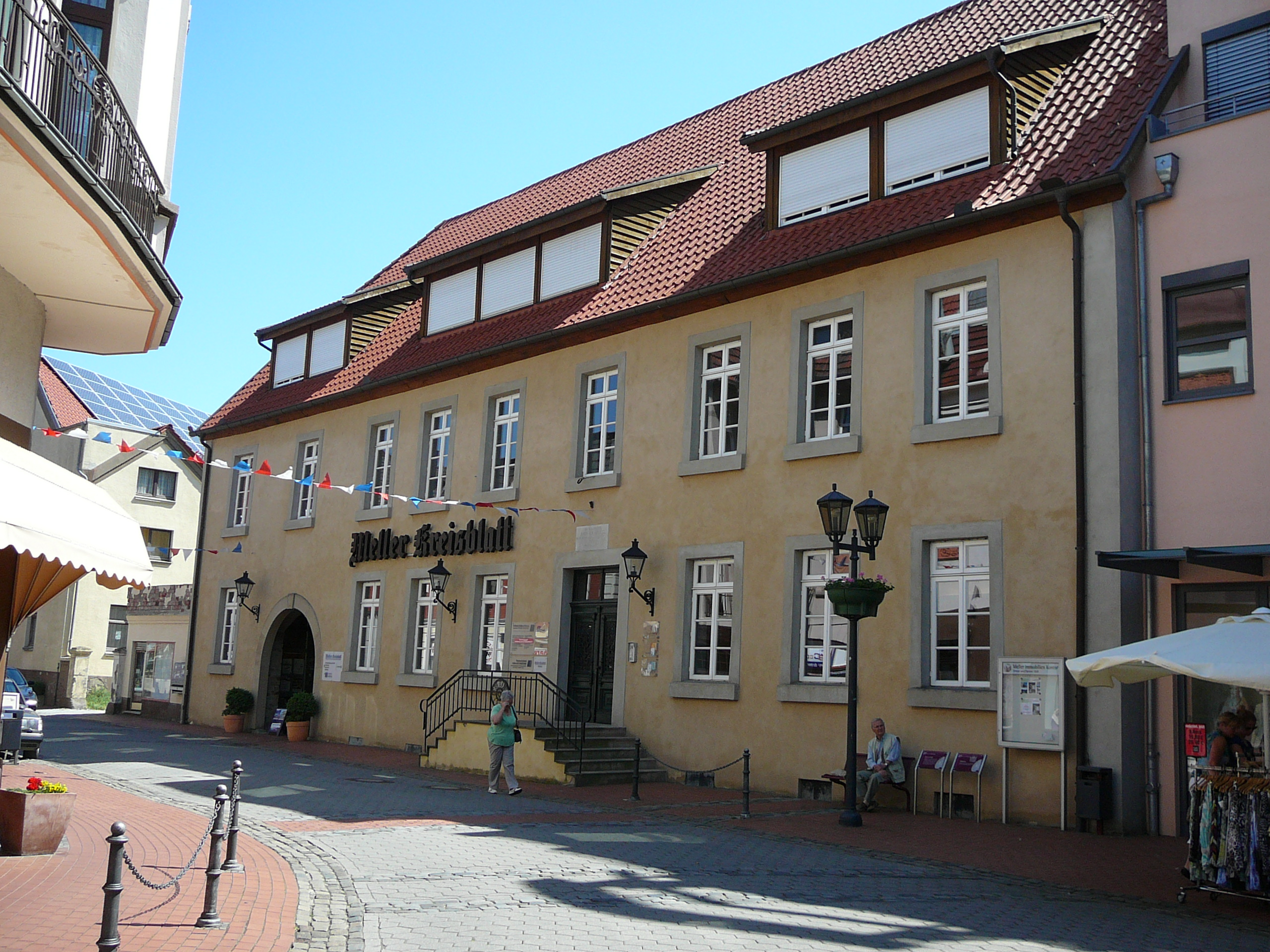
Haus vor Melle, where Jenny von Voigts lived from 1768 to 1796.

She often stayed in Osnabrück, 25 km west of Melle, especially during the winter, where her husband accompanied her for no longer than 8 days. Her parents encouraged her frequent visits. Since her brother had been killed in a duel as a student in 1773 and Justus Möser could not bear the death of his only son, Jenny took her brother's place.

After her mother's death in 1787, she ran her father's household in Osnabrück. During numerous spa stays in Bad Pyrmont, to which she accompanied her father, she made the acquaintance of a number of writers. After her father's death in 1794, she separated from her husband by mutual agreement. Despite the couple's frequent visits to each other, Jenny ran her own household in the house in Hakenstrasse in Osnabrück that she had inherited from her father. She died on December 29, 1814, in Melle. The capstone of the grave that she shared with her father and mother is now in St. Marien (Osnabrück).

Many of her correspondents and acquaintances were poets and writers: the Anacreontics Ludwig Gleim and Johann Georg Jacobi, the Enlightenment thinkers Friedrich Nicolai and Johann Erich Biester, the Hainbündler Friedrich Leopold zu Stolberg-Stolberg, Heinrich Christian Boie, Anton Matthias Sprickmann, Christian Adolph Overbeck, Charlotte von Einem and Dorothea Wehrs, and the Sturm und Drang close Friedrich Gottlieb Klopstock, Johann Wolfgang von Goethe, Friedrich Jacobi, Matthias Claudius, Friedrich von Matthisson, Elisa von der Recke, Jens Immanuel Baggesen, Friedrike Bruns, Johann Gottfried Herder, Gerhard Anton von Halem, Friedrich Bouterweck, Franz Michael Leuchsenring, Johann Joachim Eschenburg, Christian Clodius as well as August von Kotzebue, the Princess Gallitzin and August Wilhelm Schlegel, as well as musicians: Johann Friedrich Reichardt and Johann Friedrich Hugo von Dalberg.

Jenny von Voigts herself was only creatively active to a limited extent. Occasional poems, family tree entries and song poems have survived. The Lullaby to my heart attributed to her is now in the German Museum. Her literary opinions were sought after by her contemporaries. Her friend from Melle, Winold Stühle, called her "a friend of the learned world".

== Works ==
=== Edited letters ===
- 147 letters and poems to Louise of Brandenburg-Schwedt
- Letters and poems to Johann Wolfgang von Goethe

=== Editorships ===
Voigts was best known as the editor of Patriotic Fantasies, a collection of her father's writings. According to Justus Möser, Jenny made the selection and wrote a foreword to several volumes.

- Justus Möser, Patriotic Fantasies, 4 volumes, Berlin 1775 and 1776, 1778, 1786, 1804.

== Literature ==
=== Archives ===
- Oskar Fambach Archive.
- German Biographical Archive, Fiche 1314, col. 182–184.
- Goethe Museum Düsseldorf, letters to Jenny von Voigts from Johann Wolfgang von Goethe, March 4, 1782, manuscripts.
- Osnabrück Municipal Museum, Jenny von Voigts oil painting, unknown painter.
- Osnabrück University Library, Möser Documentation Center.
- Münster University and State Library, Jenny von Voigts paper cut, manuscript department, Sprickmann estate.

=== Reference works ===
- Samuel Baur: Germany's female writers. In the imperial printing press, King-Tisching (i. e.: Ulm) 1790.
- Carl Wilhelm Otto August von Schindel: The German female writers of the nineteenth century. Volume 2: M – Z. Brockhaus, Leipzig 1825.
- Georg Christoph Hamberger (founder): The learned Germany or encyclopedia of the now living German writers. Section 1: Johann Georg Meusel (ed.): The learned Germany in the nineteenth century, together with supplements to the fifth edition of that in the eighteenth. Volume 9 = Volume 21 (of the complete works): Johann Wilhelm Sigismund Lindner: T – Z. Edited by Johann Samuel Ersch. 5th, considerably enlarged and improved edition. Publisher of the Meyersche Buchhandlung, Lemgo 1827.
- Adalbert von Hanstein: Women in the history of German intellectual life in the 18th and 19th centuries. Volume 2: Women in the youth of the great educators and the great poets. Freund & Wittig, Leipzig 1900.
- Karl Goedeke, Edmund Goetze: Grundriss zur Geschichte der deutschen Dichtung aus den Quellen. 3rd edn.. Ehlermann, Leipzig 1916, Vol. 4, Section. 1. p. 44.
- Wilhelm Kosch: German Literature Encyclopedia. Biographical and Bibliographical Handbook. Volume 4: Spartacus - Zyrl and Supplements. 2nd, completely revised and greatly expanded edition. Francke, Bern 1958.
- Wilhelm Schulte: Westphalian Heads. 300 Portraits of Important Westphalians. Biographical Guide. 3rd, expanded edition. Aschendorff. Münster 1984, ISBN 3-402-05700-X.
- Rainer Hehemann: Biographical handbook on the history of the Osnabrück region (= Publication series on the Osnabrück cultural region of the Osnabrück Regional Association, vol. 3). Rasch, Bramsche 1990, ISBN 3-922469-49-3.

=== Publications ===
- C. H. Schmid: List of some living female writers and their writings. In: Journal of and for Germany. 5th year, 1st issue, ZDB-ID 515169-7, pp. 138–142, here p. 142, online.
- Allgemeiner literarischer Anzeiger. 3rd year, no. 59, 1798, ZDB-ID 533709-4, col. 615, online.
- Justus Friedrich Günther Lodtmann: Genealogy of the Möser family. Self-published, Osnabrück 1866. Digitized
- Ludwig Bäte: Jenny von Voigts. A forgotten friend of Goethe's. Local publisher of the J. Schnellsche bookstore and others, Warendorf and others. 1926.
- Ludwig Bäte: The spiritual Melle. In: Melle. A small German town. J. F. Selige, Melle 1924, pp. 39–43.
- Maria Heilmann: Old Melle citizen families. A contribution to the economic and social history of the town of Melle in the 17th and 18th centuries. In: Archive for regional and folklore studies of Lower Saxony. Vol. 23, 1944, ZDB-ID 501757-9, pp. 388–401.
- Eberhard Crusius: The circle of friends of Jenny von Voigts, née Möser. New letters from her estate with a plate. In: Osnabrücker Mitteilungen. Vol. 68, 1959, ISSN 0474-8158, pp. 221–271.
- Maria Heilmann: Important Meller personalities. In: Edgar Schroeder (ed.): Melle in eight centuries. Ernst Knoth Verlag, Melle 1969, pp. 221–232.
- Manfred Schlösser, Günter Jäckel (ed.): The people need light. Women at the time of the awakening 1790-1848 in their letters (= Agora series 22/23). 11th-20th thousand of the total edition, 1st-3rd thousand of the significantly improved edition with an appendix. Agora, Darmstadt et al. 1970, ISBN 3-87008-013-2.
- William Sheldon, Ulrike Sheldon: In the spirit of sensibility. Letters of friendship from Jenny von Voigts, Möser's daughter, to the Princess of Anhalt-Dessau 1780-1808 (= Osnabrück historical sources and research. Vol. 17, ISSN 0474-814X). Wenner, Osnabrück 1971.
- Brigitte Erker: Jenny von Voigts, née Möser (1749-1814) in Pyrmont - "the subject of many comments". In: Kathleen Burrey, Karl Piosecka (eds.): Pyrmont in the 18th century. On the cross-border potential of a health resort during the Enlightenment. Aschendorff Verlag, Münster 2024, ISBN 978-3-402-24982-6, pp. 199–234.
