= Berlin Enlightenment =

The Berlin Enlightenment was part of the 18th-century German Enlightenment. In 1740, the philosophically-oriented Frederick II, who would become known as Frederick the Great, came to power in the Kingdom of Prussia. Under his rule, Berlin gave birth to an intellectual renaissance in which it became one of the most important centers of the Enlightenment in Europe. The city was an important printing press location, as well as the new home of many drama groups. Later, it hosted a National Theater, the Academy of the Arts and the Academy of Sciences.

Central to the Berlin Enlightenment was a learned society of friends known as the Aufklärer (enlighteners), including the publisher and bookseller Friedrich Nicolai, the poet and philosopher Karl Wilhelm Ramler, the philosopher Johann Georg Sulzer, Thomas Abbt, Gotthold Ephraim Lessing, and Moses Mendelssohn. They pursued literature and literary interests, often linked with the goal of civil emancipation; at the same time, they were loyal and patriotic to the State of Prussia. The union of the civil enlightenment and the state of Prussia and its King bespoke their underlying national goals, and the advancement of German language and literature. This was also hindered by Frederick II's preference for the French language.

== People ==
- Karl Wilhelm Ramler (1725–1798)
- Johann Georg Sulzer (1720–1779)
- Thomas Abbt (1738–1766)
- Hartwig Wessely (1725–1805)
- Salomon Maimon (1753–1800)
- Johann Jakob Engel (1741–1802)
- Ernst Ferdinand Klein (1743–1810)
- Theodor Gottlieb von Hippel (1741–1796)
- Julien Offray de La Mettrie (1709–1751)
- Voltaire (1694–1778)
- Karl Philipp Moritz (1756–1793)
- Philipp Buttmann (1764–1829)
- Christoph Friedrich Nicolai (1733–1811)
- Johann Erich Biester (1749–1816)
- Friedrich Gedike (1754–1803)

== See also ==
- German Enlightenment
- Berliner Mittwochsgesellschaft
- Frederick the Great
- Haskalah
