= Berliner Mittwochsgesellschaft =

The (Geheime) Berliner Mittwochsgesellschaft ("[Secret] Berlin Wednesday Society") was a small group of German liberal thinkers in Berlin.

As early as 1783 (with Johann Erich Biester as secretary), intellectuals associated with the Late Enlightenment had gathered in a Gesellschaft der Freunde der Aufklärung, or Society of Friends of the Enlightenment. It was established by Wilhelm Abraham Teller. Members included the Prussian finance minister Carl August von Struensee, the finance councillor Johann Heinrich Wloemer (1726–1797), the poet Leopold Friedrich Günther von Goeckingk, Christian Konrad Wilhelm von Dohm, the theatre director and writer Johann Jacob Engel, the Supreme Court councillor Friedrich Wilhelm von Beneke, Friedrich Gedike, Karl Franz von Irwing, the jurist Ernst Ferdinand Klein, Franz Michael Leuchsenring, the physician Johann Carl Wilhelm Moehsen und Christian Gottlieb Selle, the preachers Johann Joachim Spalding and Johann Friedrich Zöllner, and Karl Gottlieb Suarez. Moses Mendelssohn was an honorary member.

It was through this scholarly semi-secret society, as well as through the longer-lived Montagsclub, which had a more social character, that the Berlin Enlightenment spread its ideas, using the Berlinische Monatsschrift as an outlet. Nearly every member wrote in this paper, and Werner Krauss, in his studies of the period, called it the movement's most important forum.

In 1798, Frederick William III of Prussia closed down the society as a threat to public order.

With the short-lived Berliner Blätter and Neue Berlinische Monatsschrift (which lasted until 1811), Biester continued to promote their ideas, the enthusiasm for which philosophical Idealism had threatened to quench; but the standards of previous years (when Kant had made contributions) were never quite matched, and Biester died in 1816, with no-one left to replace him.
