= What Is Enlightenment? =

1784 essay by Immanuel Kant

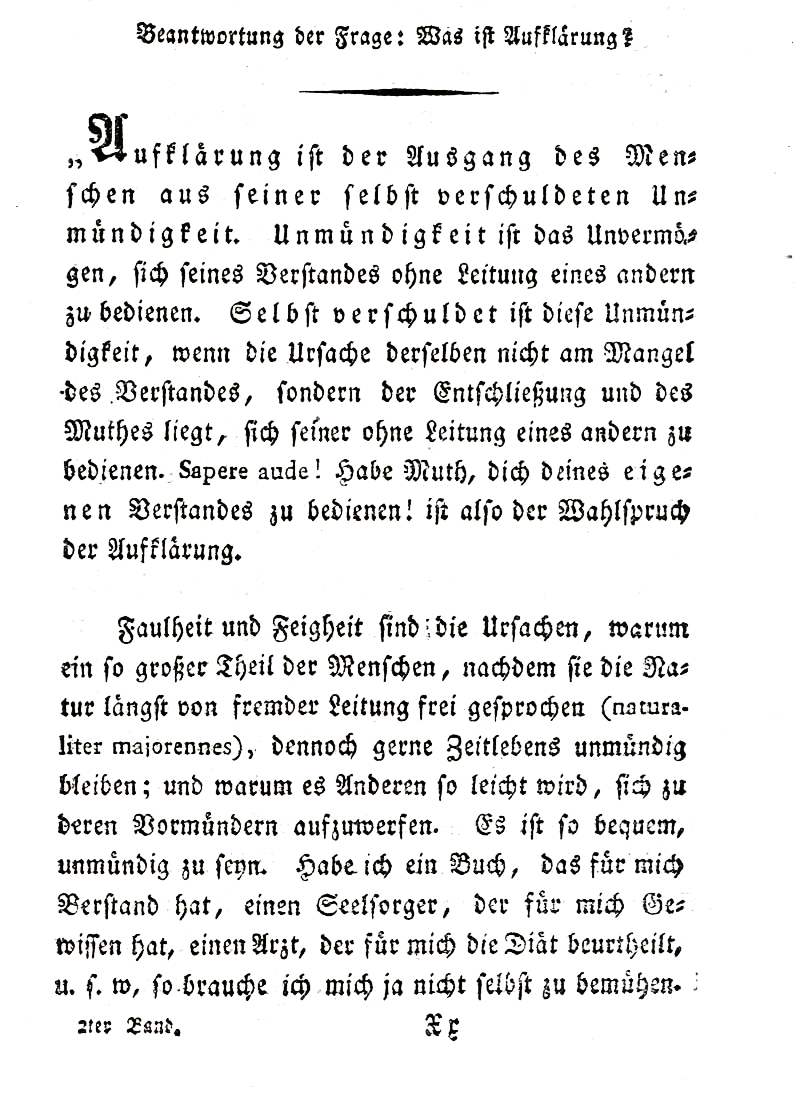
The first page of the 1799 edition

"Answering the Question: What is Enlightenment?" (German: Beantwortung der Frage: Was ist Aufklärung?), often referred to simply as "What is Enlightenment?" (Was ist Aufklärung?), is a 1784 essay by the philosopher Immanuel Kant.

In the December 1784 issue of the Berlinische Monatsschrift (Berlin Monthly), edited by Friedrich Gedike and Johann Erich Biester, Kant replied to the question posed a year earlier by the Reverend Johann Friedrich Zöllner, who was also an official in the Prussian government. Zöllner's question was addressed to a broad intellectual public community, in reply to Biester's essay titled "Proposal, not to engage the clergy any longer when marriages are conducted" (April 1783). A number of leading intellectuals replied with essays, of which Kant's is the most famous and has had the most impact.

Kant's opening paragraph of the essay is a much-cited definition of enlightenment as the courage to think for oneself:

Enlightenment is man's emergence from his self-imposed immaturity [selbstverschuldeten Unmündigkeit]. Immaturity is the inability to use one's understanding without guidance from another. This immaturity is self-imposed when its cause lies not in lack of understanding, but in lack of resolve and courage to use it without guidance from another. Sapere Aude! "Have courage to use your own understanding!"—that is the motto of enlightenment.

== See also ==
- Enlightenment (philosophical concept)
- Age of Enlightenment
- Anti-intellectualism
- Golden Age of Freethought
- Higher criticism
- Natural philosophy
- Public reason
- Self-efficacy
