= Dietrich Nummert =

German journalist and writer (1928–2010)

Dietrich Karl Nummert
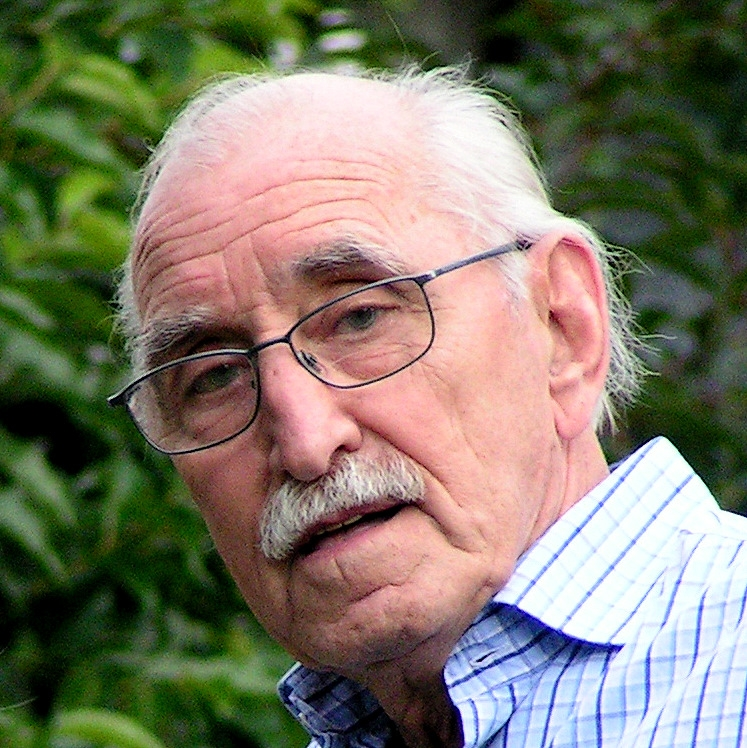
- Born: May 12, 1928; Mönchengladbach, Germany
- Died: June 28, 2010 (aged 82); Berlin, Germany
- Occupations: Journalist, author
- Era: 20th–21st century
- Employer(s): Buchverlag Junge Welt, Verlag Neues Leben, Junge Generation
- Notable work: Biography of Bruno Kühn (1970)

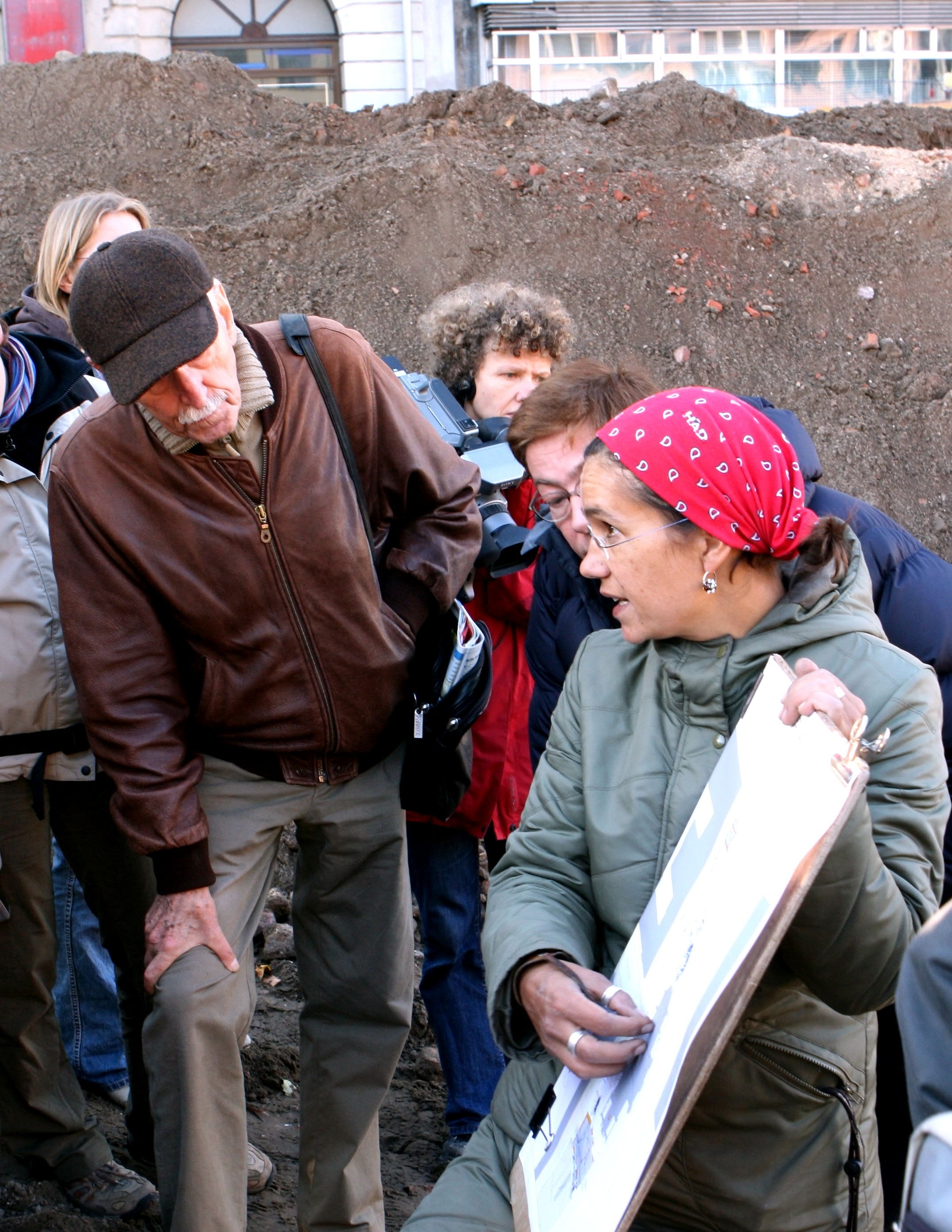
Dietrich Nummert and Claudia Melisch at Petriplatz in Berlin 2007

Dietrich Karl Nummert (12 May 1928 – 28 June 2010) was a German journalist and author.

== Life ==
Born in Mönchengladbach as the son of Luise and Friedrich Nummert, Dietrich Nummert grew up in East Prussian Insterburg and first trained as an engine fitter. Shortly before the end of the Second World War, he worked at the Heinkel Flugzeugwerke in Rostock-Marienehe and after the war in the Rostock Neptun Werft, where he led a youth brigade. After the war he lived first in Lauenburg, then in Berlin, where he worked for Bergmann-Borsig.

Rooted in the working-class world through his origins and career choice, Dietrich Nummert was artistically interested and led a community theatre group in Bernburg at the end of the 1940s, which performed in the Bernburg municipal theatre.

After the war and the Nazi dictatorship, Nummert joined the Free German Youth and temporarily held a full-time position there.

Around 1957, he completed a two-year editorial course at the GDR Union of Journalists in Berlin. From February 1956 he worked in the editorial department of Buchverlag Junge Welt. There, in 1970, he published the biography of Bruno Kühn, the eldest brother of Lotte Ulbricht, for the Central Council of the FDJ. He also worked for the GDR youth publishing house Verlag Neues Leben and worked until August 1969 as deputy editor-in-chief of the theory magazine for FDJ functionaries Junge Generation, for which the "Zentralrat der FDJ" awarded him the certificate of honour. At the end of the 1970s to the beginning of the 1980s, he ran the Berlin "Club der Werktätigen" (Club of the Working People), where he invited interesting personalities from Germany and abroad to give lectures and treated the guests to culinary specialities.

Afterwards he worked as a freelance journalist and wrote for various GDR newspapers. Since the beginning of the 1990s, he regularly wrote - mostly biographical - articles for the Berlinische Monatsschrift at the Luisenstädtischer Bildungsverein, a journal in the tradition of the eponymous Berlinische Monatsschrift founded by Johann Erich Biester and Friedrich Gedike in 1783, which appeared until 2001. Nummert showed great interest in the history of Berlin and wrote many portraits of well-known Berlin personalities. Since 2007, he has accompanied as a regular visito the archaeologist excavations of Claudia Melisch in Berliner Petriplatz.

Nummert lived in Berlin-Friedrichshain until his death in 82 as a result of cancer in a hospice in Pankow. His grave is located at the Evangelischer Friedhof Stralau.

== Essays ==
- Er war Pionierleiter: Leben und Kampf des Berliner Arbeiterjungen Bruno Kühn. Buchverlag Junge Welt, Berlin 1970.
- Wege der Kortschagins, Junge Generation 1975, 1, pp. 61–66.
- Nachwort und Anhang zu Horst Bastian: Barfuß ins Vaterland. Verlag Neues Leben Berlin, 1987, ISBN 3-355-00332-8.
- Irene Duchrow, Dietrich Nummert: Dem Reich der Freiheit werb’ ich Bürgerinnen. Louise Otto-Peters, Begründerin der deutschen Frauenbewegung. (Manuscript). Rundfunkvortrag im Deutschlandsender Kultur am 11 May 1991.
