= Ernst Gennat =

German criminologist (1880–1939)

Regierungs- und Kriminalrat Ernst Gennat
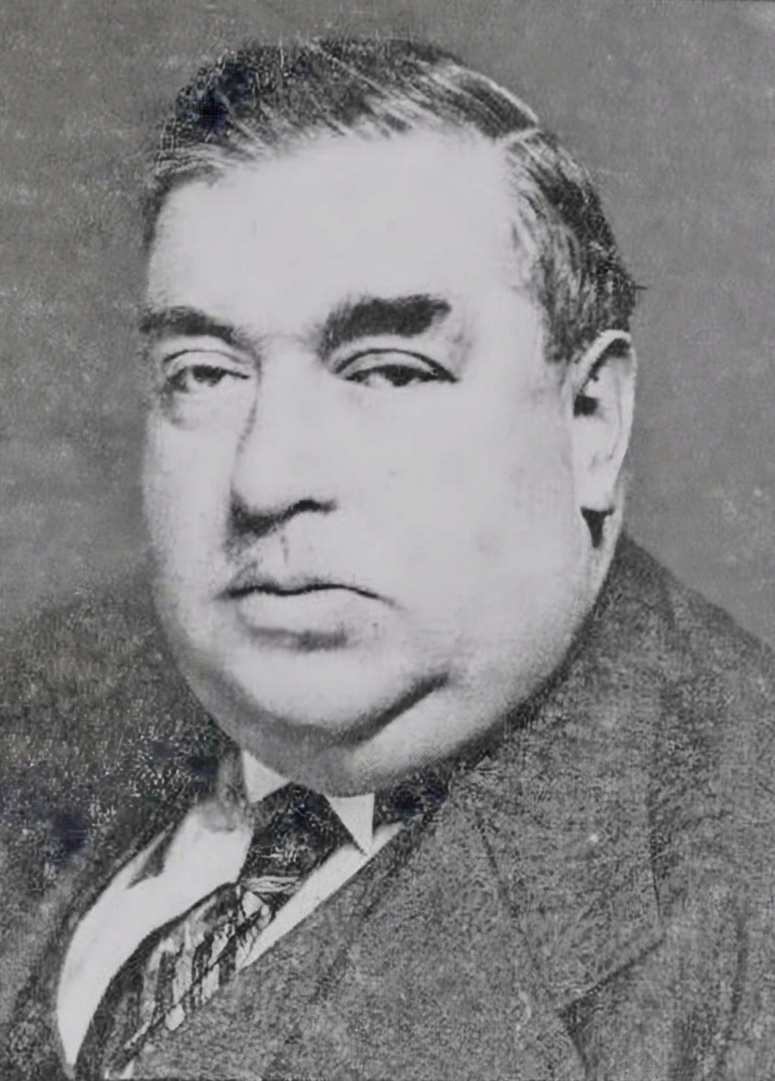
- Gennat in 1931

Permanent Deputy to the Head of the Berlin Criminal Police
- In office 1935–1939
- Preceded by: Office established
- Succeeded by: Office abolished

Personal details
- Born: Ernst August Ferdinand Gennat; 1 January 1880 Plötzensee, Berlin, German Empire
- Died: 21 August 1939 (aged 59) Berlin, Nazi Germany
- Resting place: Stahnsdorf South-Western Cemetery
- Spouse: Elfriede Martha Dinger (m. 1939)
- Education: Friedrich-Wilhelm-Universität
- Nicknames: Buddha; Der Dicke vom Alexanderplatz (the fat one from Alexanderplatz)

Ernst August Ferdinand Gennat (1 January 1880 – 20 August 1939) was director of the Berlin criminal police. He worked under three political systems in his 30-year career as one of the most gifted and successful criminologists in the German Reich. His caseload included those of Fritz Haarmann and Peter Kürten.

== Biography ==
In his childhood, he lived with his parents in staff housing of the correctional facility in Berlin-Plötzensee. He graduated from high school on 13 September 1898, and entered the faculty of law at Frederick William University on 18 October 1901. In the intervening years, it can be assumed that he served in the military (which he noted as his occupation when he was matriculated at the university).

On 12 July 1905, he left the university without a degree, shortly before the semester was scheduled to end (on 15 August) to embark on his career in the police – he had entered the police service in 1904 and passed the examination to criminal police officer on 30 May 1905. Two days later, he started as detective assistant and was promoted to criminal detective on 1 August.

When Gennat entered the criminal police, there was no separate homicide division. It was only on 25 August 1902 that an on-call homicide service was created. That had not changed even when the Berlin police was reorganized on 1 June 1925. It was solely by Gennat's efforts that a homicide squad was eventually created, which earned him promotion to lieutenant inspector (at the age of 45). He had previously been passed over for promotion owing to the insistent criticism he had levelled at how the criminal department operated.

During the Third Reich, he was able to continue working despite maintaining distance from the Nazi Party. His successes even saw him promoted to departmental director in 1934 and deputy director of Berlin's police in 1935. He married criminal inspector Elfriede Dinger shortly before his death on 20 August 1939 at age 59 (he was suffering from cancer, although the suddenness of his death could indicate a stroke).

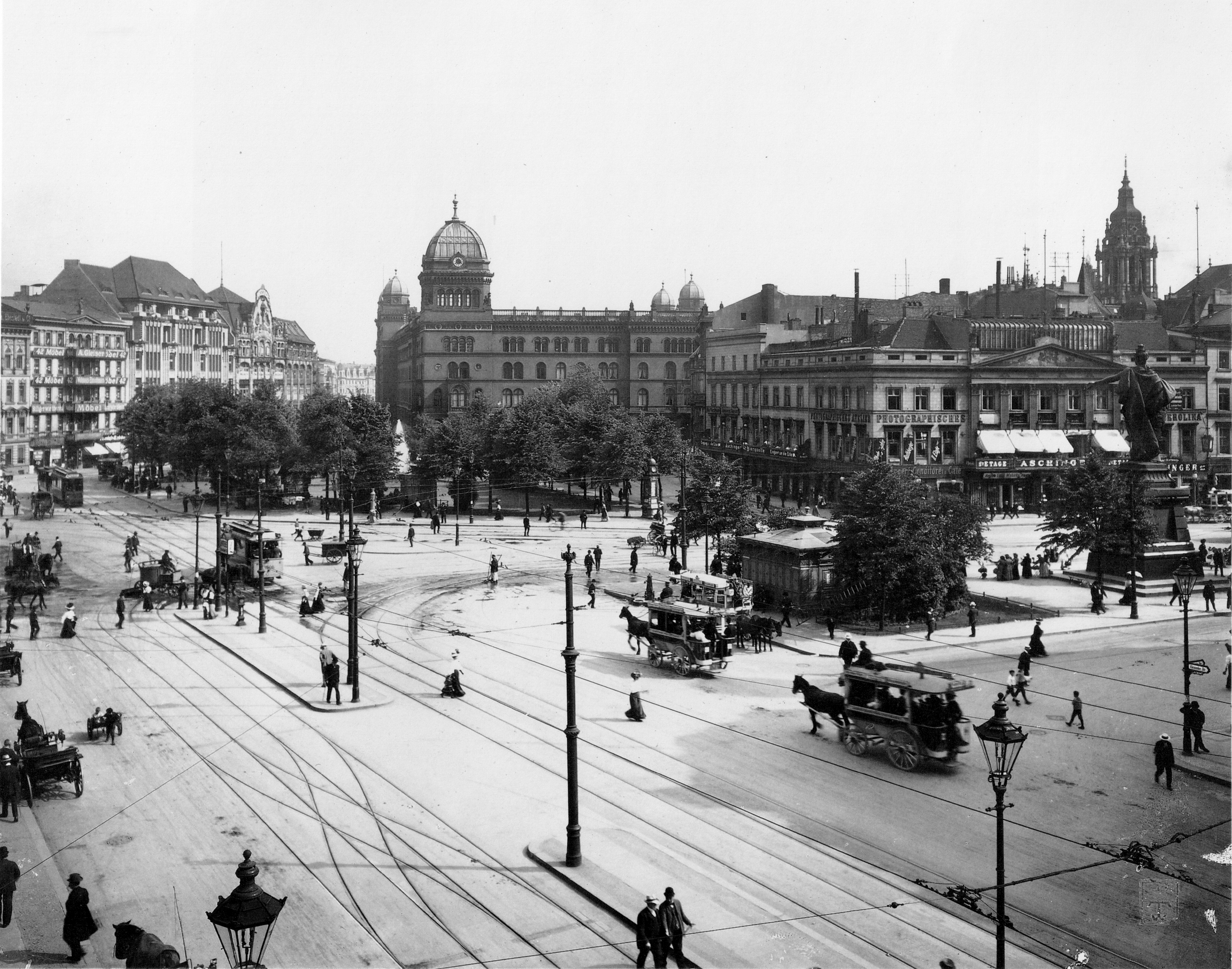
The Alexanderplatz with the police headquarters (middle)

== Gennat's homicide division at the Berlin police ==
After the creation of the Zentrale Mordinspektion (central homicide inspectorate), the division had great success under Gennat's leadership. In 1931, the homicide inspectorate solved 108 of its 114 cases, a success rate of 94.7% (compared to 85% to 95% for modern homicide investigations). Gennat himself worked on solving 298 homicide cases. His department was organized as one standing team of detectives with two backup teams. The active team had one senior and one junior homicide detective plus between 4 and 10 criminal constables, a stenotypist and a dog handler. The backup teams had one senior and one junior homicide detective (teamed under what was known as a "Mord-Ehe" or "marriage of murder") plus 2 or 3 constables and a stenotypist. The make-up of the active team changed every four weeks to ensure that each officer gained proper work experience.

== Advances in investigation techniques ==
Gennat reorganized much of the methodology by which homicide is investigated. Building on early forensic science as established by Hans Gross, he was among the first to recognize the importance of the exact preservation of evidence at crime scenes. Up till then, it had been common practice for the first policemen at a crime scene to start by "cleaning up the mess" or arranging the corpse in a decorous, reverent manner. Gennat drew up precise guidelines for crime scene procedures and established the inviolable principle forbidding anyone from touching or changing anything until the investigators had arrived.

Aiming to facilitate thorough and quick investigation work, Gennat had the Daimler-Benz AG build a standby homicide division car (colloquially known as the "murder car") according to his own plans. This was a passenger car equipped with office and forensic technology based on the Benz Limousine 16/50 PS. On the occasion of the Great Police Exhibition 1926 (25 September – 17 October) in Berlin the public got a chance to visit the murder car.

The murder car could be converted to a temporary office when necessary. A typewriter (complete with a stenotypist) was part of the inventory, as were collapsible chairs and a table for work in the open air alongside two retractable tables inside the car. For the immediate work at the crime scene there were materials for securing evidence and steel marking posts with sequential numbers; everything from searchlights to diamond cutters and axes.

Gennat would always sit behind the front seat passenger, where he had a special brace built in. Otherwise his weight would have disbalanced the car. The homicide division of the criminal investigation department in Munich, instituted in 1927, was provided with a murder car and the corresponding equipment as well.

What is more, Gennat's "central file for murder cases", also known as "death investigation card file", equally gained international fame. For several decades detective Otto Knauf was in charge of this system, where every violent death even outside of Berlin that was known to the police was systematically documented. Until 1945 no other police department had a collection of case descriptions as extensive as that of the Zentrale Mordinspektion. It allowed reconstructions of past cases in the shortest possible time in order to identify potential links in the execution of the crimes. Source material included press reports and wanted posters beside original files.

Ernst Gennat would also ask for investigation files from other police departments to be sent over for inspection – some of which he would then "forget" to return. The systematically structured card file comprised not just capital offences but also the categories "indirect or cold murder" (suicide following defamation or false accusations), "existential destruction through malicious deception" (suicides provoked by scammers, frauds, obscure fortune tellers or marriage impostors) and "existential destruction through blackmail". Gennat took the view that driving a person into suicide had to be penalised as well. Some pieces from his archive are now part of the inventory of the collection of the history of the police in Berlin (Polizeihistorische Sammlung Berlin).

== Personality ==
Beside the advances in organisation and investigation techniques, it was Gennat's personal qualities which made him so successful. He was lauded in particular for his persistency and perseverance, his phenomenal memory, and the enormous psychological empathy which already enabled him to practise what came to be termed "criminal profiling" forty years later. He was strictly against forcible means in interrogations, emphatically warning his colleagues, "Whoever lays a finger on a suspect is out! Our weapons are brains and nerves!".

Moreover, it was Gennat (not Robert Ressler) who coined the term "serial killer" in his 1930 article "Die Düsseldorfer Sexualverbrechen" (on Peter Kürten). Gennat appears surprisingly modern in many regards. He stressed the importance of prevention as against the investigation of crimes. Being aware of the effect of capital offences on the public and of the opinion-forming role of the press, he strived to harness these aspects for the purposes of investigative work.

Beyond his dry Berlin humour and the numerous witticisms and anecdotes circulating about him, Gennat's striking corpulence (he weighed an estimated 120 kilograms, or 270 lbs) also contributed to no small degree to making the "Big Guy from the homicide squad" a famous character. This was owing to his huge appetite, in particular his passion for (gooseberry) cake. Another nickname applied to him was "The Buddha of the Alexanderplatz," referring to the location of his office. His secretary Gertrude Steiner was nicknamed "Bockwurst-Trudchen" for a reason.

== In culture ==
Ernst Gennat inspired the fictional character inspector Karl Lohmann who appeared in Fritz Lang's M (1931) and The Testament of Dr. Mabuse (1932).

Ernst Gennat is a recurring character in several of the Bernie Gunther novels by Philip Kerr.

German actor Udo Samel plays Gennat in the second through the fifth seasons of the TV show Babylon Berlin, which is based on Volker Kutscher's historical crime novels featuring fictional inspector Gereon Rath.

== Literature ==
- Karl Berg: Der Sadist, Der Fall Peter Kürten. Belleville, Munich 2004 ISBN 3-923646-12-7 (Gerichtsärztliches und Kriminalpsychologisches zu den Taten des Düsseldorfer Mörders Peter Kürten)
- Dietrich Nummert: Buddha oder der volle Ernst. Der Kriminalist Ernst Gennat (1880 – 1939). In: Berlinische Monatsschrift, 1999, Heft 9, pp. 64–99 Volltext
- Franz von Schmidt: Vorgeführt erscheint. Erlebte Kriminalistik. Stuttgarter Hausbücherei, Stuttgart 1955
- Franz von Schmidt: Mord im Zwielicht. Erlebte Kriminalgeschichte. Verlag Deutsche Volksbücher, Stuttgart 1961
- Regina Stürickow: Habgier. Berlin-Krimi-Verlag, Berlin-Brandenburg 2003 ISBN 3-89809-025-6 (Historischer Kriminalroman, basierend auf dem authentischen Mordfall Martha Franzke von 1916)
- Regina Stürickow: Der Kommissar vom Alexanderplatz. Aufbau Taschenbuch-Verlag, Berlin 2000 ISBN 3-7466-1383-3 (Biografie)
- Regina Stürickow: Mörderische Metropole Berlin, Kriminalfälle 1914 – 1933. Militzke, Leipzig 2004 ISBN 3-86189-708-3
- Regina Stürickow: Mörderische Metropole Berlin, Kriminalfälle im Dritten Reich. Militzke, Leipzig 2005 ISBN 3-86189-741-5
- Ernst Gennat: "Die Düsseldorfer Sexualmorde." In: Kriminalistische Monatshefte 1930, p. 2–7, 27–32, 49–54, 79–82.
