= Karl Wilhelm Ramler =

German poet (1725–1798)

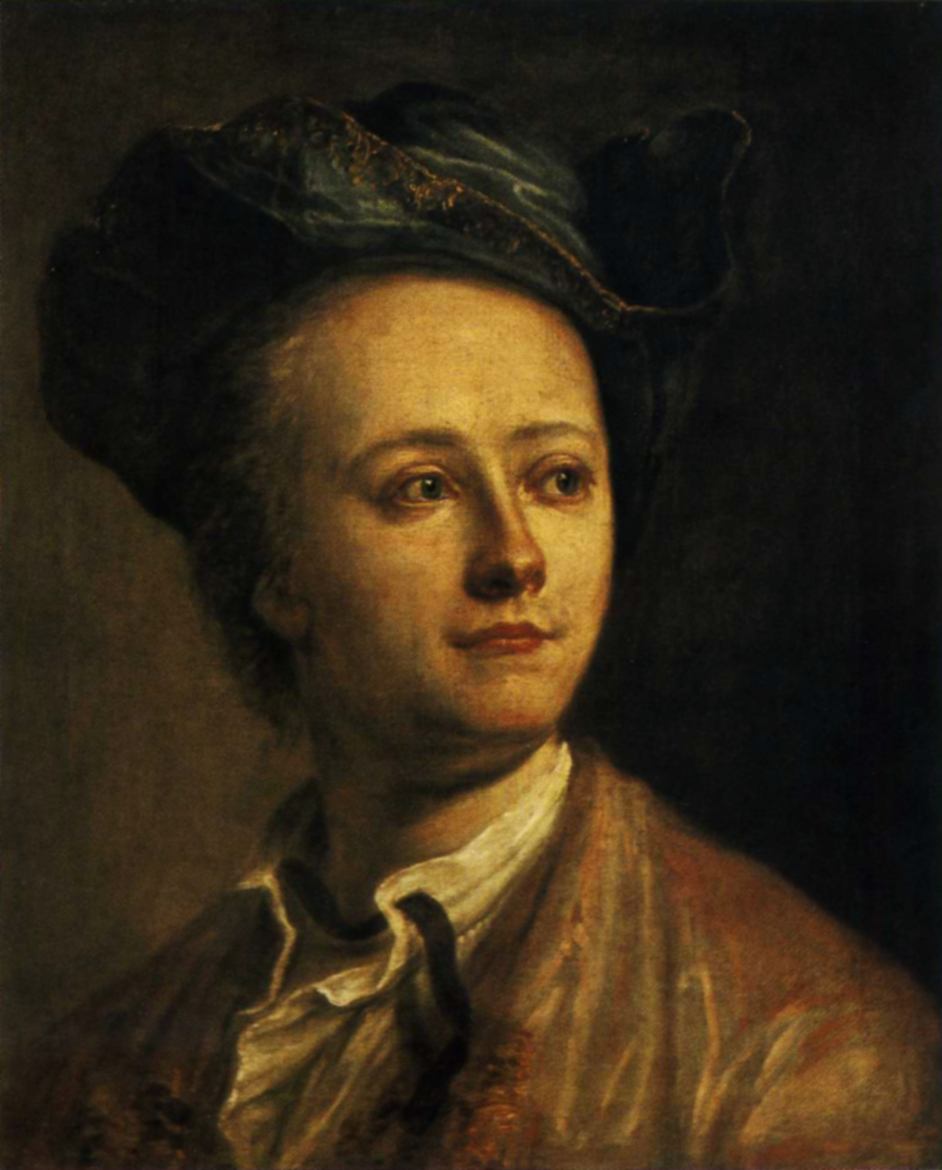
Karl Wilhelm Ramler, portrait by Gottfried Hempel, 1749 (Gleimhaus Halberstadt)

Karl Wilhelm Ramler (25 February 1725 – 11 April 1798) was a German poet who was the Berlin Cadet School master.

Ramler was born in Kolberg. After graduating from the University of Halle, he went to Berlin, where, in 1748, he was appointed professor of logic and literature at the cadet school. In 1786, he became associated with the author Johann Jakob Engel in the management of the royal theatre, of which, after resigning his professorship, he became sole director from 1790 to 1796. He died in Berlin and his memorial is to be seen on the exterior wall of the city's Sophienkirche.
