= Ferdinand Collmann =

German painter (1762–1837)

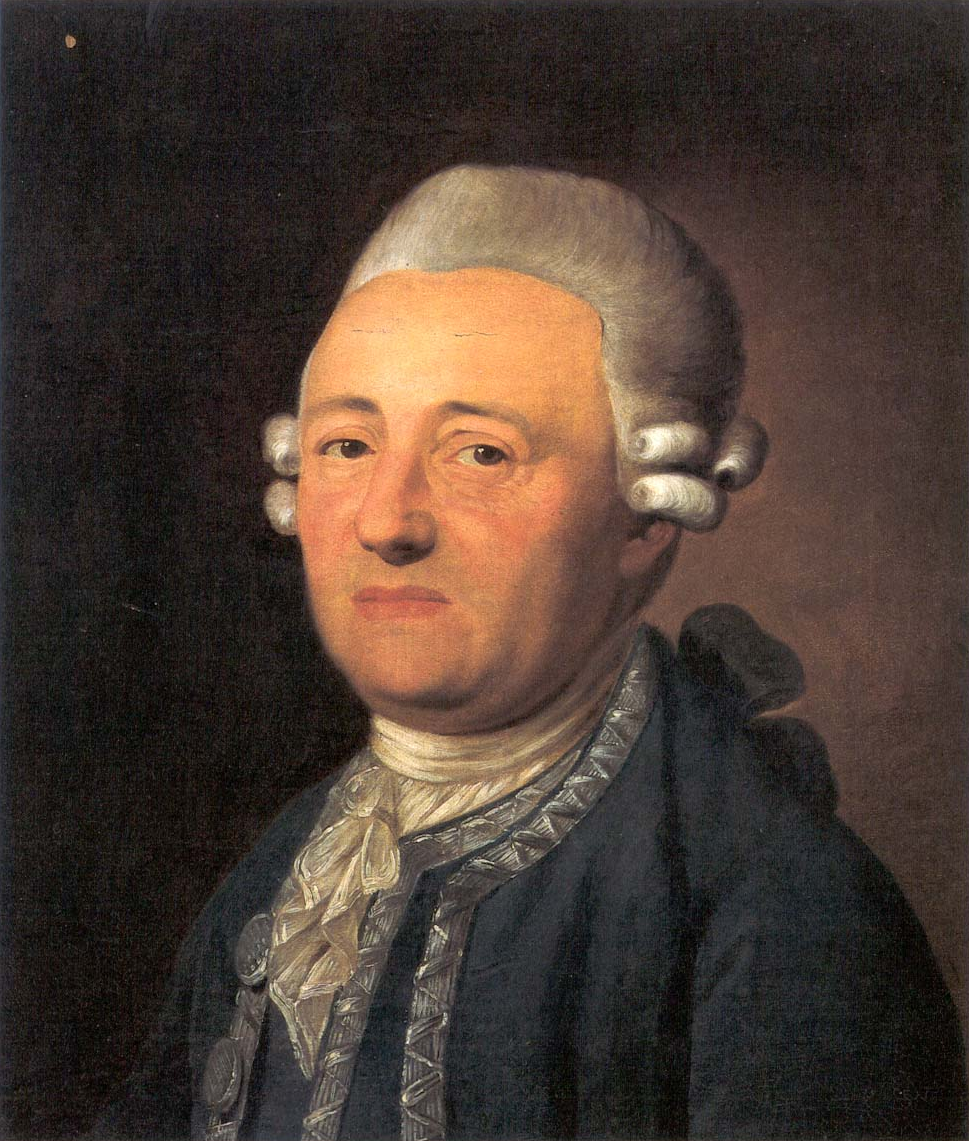
Portrait of encyclopaedist Johann Georg Krünitz by Collmann

Johann Friedrich Wilhelm Ferdinand Collmann (October 1762 – 28 August 1837) was a German painter and professor born in Berlin. Between 1821 and 1837 he was a member of the Preußische Akademie der Künste.

Among his works were portraits of Christoph Friedrich Nicolai, Johann Jakob Engel (1789), Ewald Friedrich von Hertzberg (1789), Daniel Nikolaus Chodowiecki (1790), Johann Erich Biester (1795) and Johann Georg Krünitz (1795).

== See also ==
- List of German painters
