= Johann Georg Krünitz =

German encyclopedist (1728–1796)

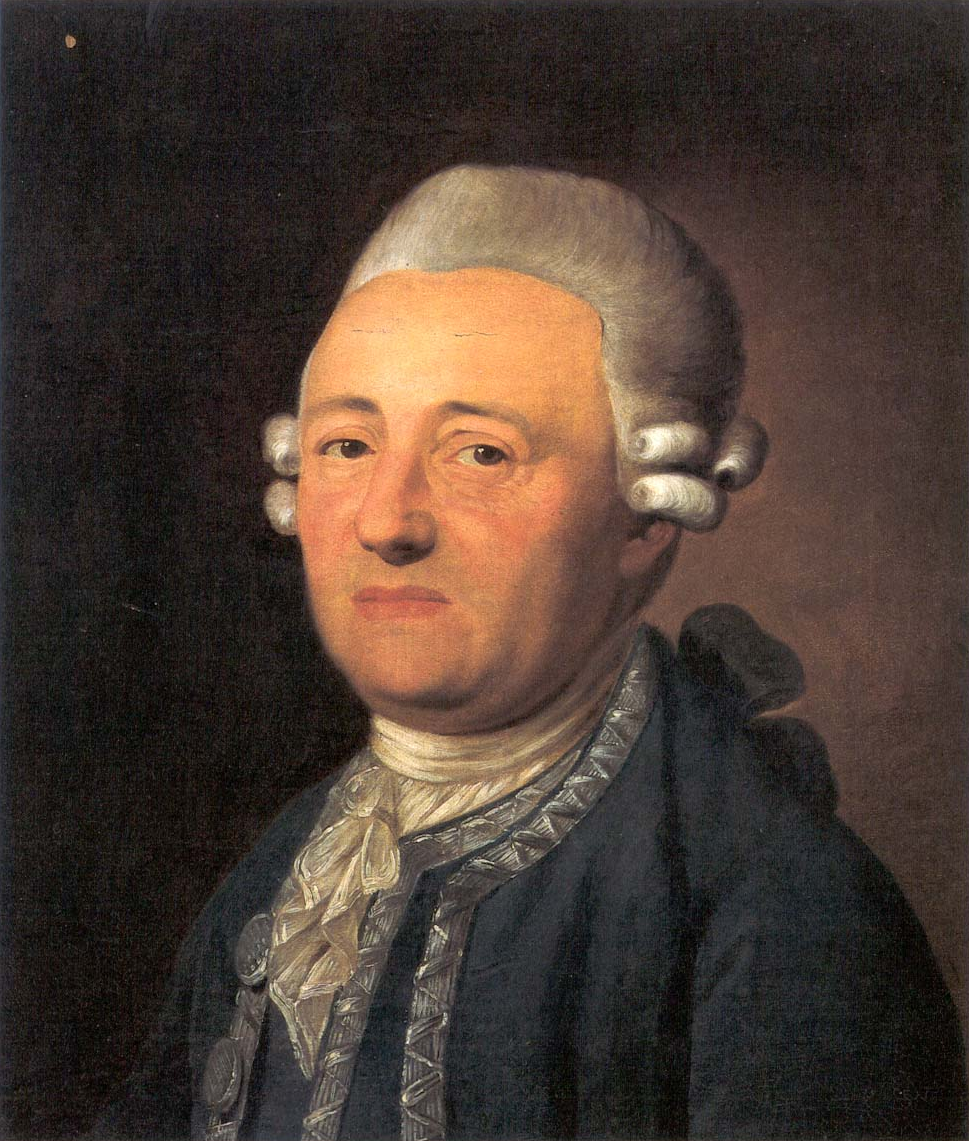
J. G. Krünitz by Ferdinand Collmann, 1795

Johann Georg Krünitz (20 March 1728 – 20 December 1796) was an encyclopedist from the Kingdom of Prussia (in the Holy Roman Empire) who started the 242-volume Oekonomische Encyklopädie and during his lifetime managed to complete its first 72 volumes.

== Life ==
Krünitz was born in Berlin as the son of merchant Georg Christoph Krünitz. From 1747, he studied medicine and the natural sciences in Halle (Saale), Göttingen and Frankfurt (Oder). After achieving his doctorate with a dissertation called De matrimonio multorum morborum remedio in 1749, he started to practice as a physician in Frankfurt. Krünitz married Anna Sophie Lehmann in 1752 and moved to Berlin in 1759, where he continued to practice medicine until 1776. After Anna's death in 1780, he married Charlotte Wilhelmine Halle, the daughter of economist Johann Samuel Halle.

Krünitz died in Berlin in 1795 while working on volume 73 of his Enzyklopädie. The preface to this posthumously published volume contained the following macabre fact:

Already, he had been working on this 73rd edition, and he completed several sheets of it, up to the article 'Corpse'. (Original German: "Schon arbeitete er an gegenwärtigem drey und siebzigsten Bande, und er vollführte einige Bogen davon bis zum Artikel Leiche.")

== See also ==
- Blotting paper coffee filter
