= Johann Philipp Siebenkees =

German philosopher (1759–1796)

- Born: 4 October 1759; Germany
- Died: 25 June 1796 (aged 36); Germany

Education
- Education: University of Altdorf

Philosophical work
- Main interests: Theology, philosophy, philology, archeology

Johann Philipp Siebenkees (4 October 1759 – 25 June 1796) was a German philosopher.

Siebenkees studied theology, philosophy, and philology at the Protestant University of Altdorf. In 1791 he became associate professor of philosophy there, and a full professor of languages in 1795. He also taught archaeology. It has been suggested that he was responsible for the invention of the iron maiden during this period. However, the oldest citation for it in the Oxford English Dictionary is from Johann Georg Keyssler's Travels through Germany, Bohemia, Hungary, Switzerland, Italy, and Lorrain - 1st edition, 1756–1757. The quote is very sceptical, so the invention seems older.

Johann Philipp Siebenkees was a cousin of the poet Johann Christian Siebenkees.

Siebenkees undertook several voyages to Venice, Rome, and Naples. He died of a stroke in 1796.
