= Franz Oberthür =

German Roman Catholic scholar

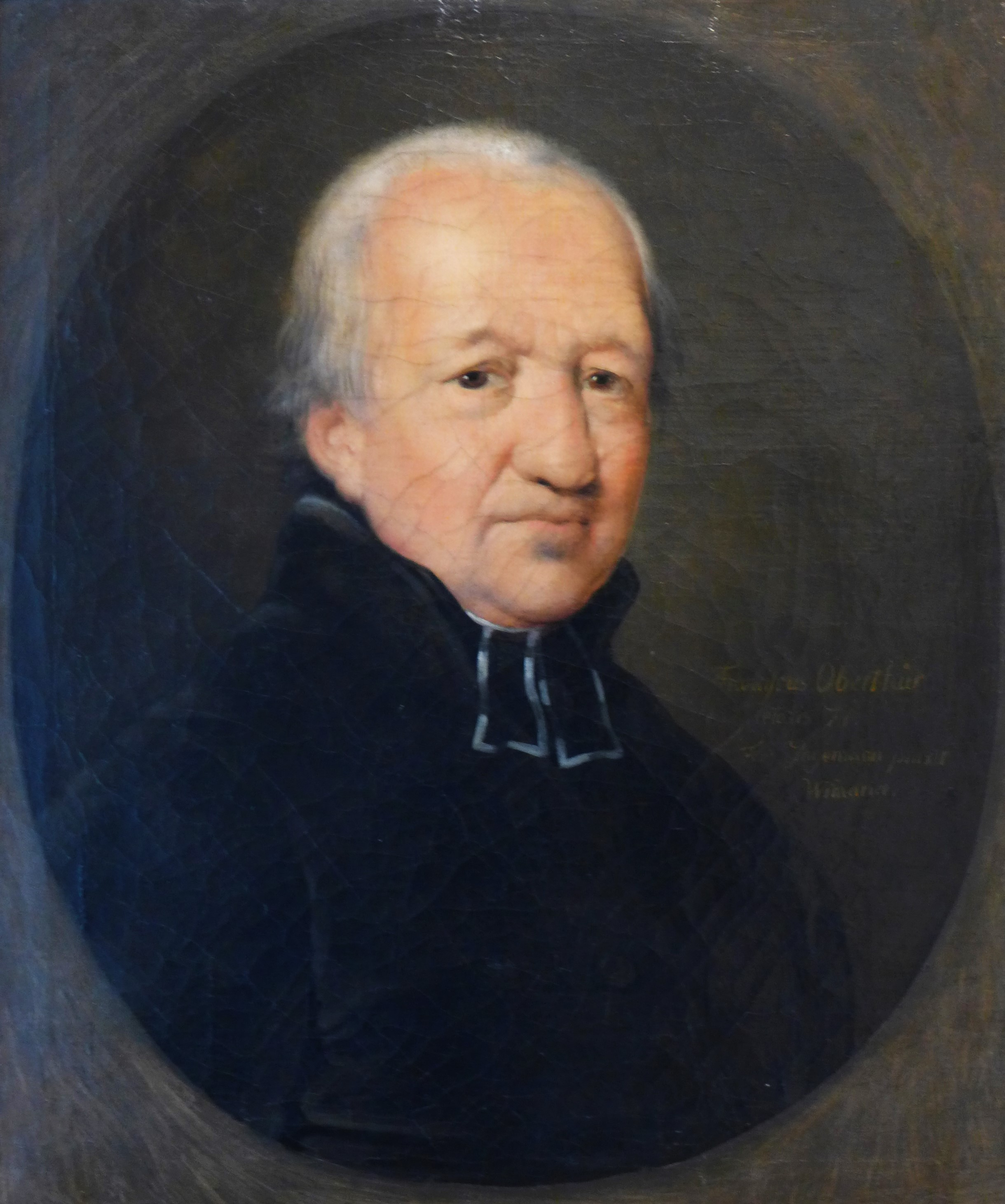
Franz Oberthür, oil painting by Ferdinand Jagemann.

Franz Oberthür (6 August 1745 in Würzburg – 30 August 1831) was a German Roman Catholic scholar who edited an 18th-century edition of Josephus once owned by Thomas Jefferson.

In 1773 he was appointed professor of dogmatics and polemics at the University of Würzburg. He is best known for his efforts involving reform within the church and the education system. In 1806 he founded the Gesellschaft zur Vervollkommung der mechanischen Künste (Society for the Perfection of Mechanical Arts).

== Selected works ==
- "Flavii Iosephi Hebraei Opera omnia graece et latine : excusa ad editionem Lugduno-Batauam Sigeberti Hauercampii, cum Oxoniensi Ioannis Hudsonii collatam", 1782.
- "Idea biblica ecclesiae Dei". 1790.
- Theologische Encyklopädie oder der Theologischen Wissenschaften Umfang und Zusammenhang, 1828 – Theological encyclopaedia; theological sciences scope and context.
