= Johann Christian Siebenkees =

German jurist, poet, and writer (1753–1841)

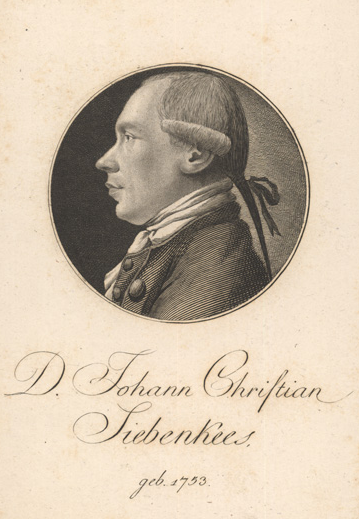
Johann Christian Siebenkees

Johann Christian Siebenkees (20 August 1753 – 22 November 1841) was a German jurist, poet, and writer. He was a cousin of the philosopher Johann Philipp Siebenkees.
