= Leopold Friedrich Günther von Goeckingk =

Poet and journalist (1748–1828)

Leopold von Goeckingk
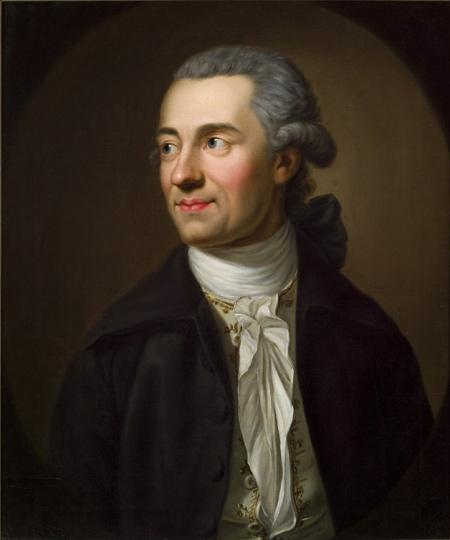
- Self portrait
- Born: Leopold Friedrich Günther von Goeckingk; July 13, 1748; Gröningen, Landkreis Börde, Saxony
- Died: February 18, 1828 (aged 79); Groß Wartenberg, now Syców, Lower Silesia
- Occupation: Lyric poet, journalist, book-keeper, jurisprudent and royal official
- Notable works: Lieder zweier Liebenden ("Songs of Two Lovers")
- Spouse: Ferdinande Vogel
- Children: 1 daughter

Leopold Friedrich Günther von Goeckingk, also Göckingk (13 July 1748 – 18 February 1828) was a Saxon-Prussian lyric poet, journalist, and royal Prussian official.

== Life ==
Goeckingk was born in Gröningen (Landkreis Börde) and went to school in Halberstadt, where he became friends with Johann Wilhelm Ludwig Gleim. He continued his schooling at Halle, where he was a fellow pupil of another noted poet, Gottfried August Bürger. He went to the university of that city and studied book-keeping and jurisprudence. After finishing his studies in 1768 he became Referendar in the War and Territorial Chamber in Halberstadt. From 1770 he was chancellery director in the Prussian settlement of Ellrich, found the time to begin a career as a writer with Lieder zweier Liebenden ("Songs of Two Lovers"), and met his future wife Ferdinande Vogel (d. 1781). Between 1776 and 1779 he helped edit the Göttinger Musenalmanach, and in 1783 he founded the Journals von und für Deutschland. In 1786 he became a councillor in the War and Territorial Chamber in Magdeburg, in 1788 an agricultural tax commissioner in Wernigerode and Prussian commissar, and in 1793 upper privy councillor of finance in Berlin.

Goeckingk was ennobled in 1789 as a reward for successfully putting the affairs of the Royal Abbey of Quedlinburg in order. From this point on he styled himself Goeckingk auf Daldorf und Günthersdorf. After the General Directory in Berlin was dissolved following the Treaty of Tilsit (1807), he made his resignation in 1808 and turned back to poetry. He lived for several years in Wernigerode.

In 1814 he withdrew from his remaining official responsibilities and went into retirement. He lived at first in Berlin, then moved in with his daughter at Groß Wartenberg, now Syców, where he died on 18 February 1828.

Goeckingk belonged to the Halberstädter Dichterkreis ("Halberstadt Poets' Circle") and was one of its most outstanding representatives. He was also a member of the Berliner Mittwochsgesellschaft ("Berlin Wednesdays Society"), and the Illuminati in Göttingen. He was the brother-in-law of the jurist and poet Johann Gottlob Benjamin Pfeil (1732–1800).

== Selected works ==
- Sinngedichte. Halberstadt 1772; 2. Aufl. Leipzig 1778
- Gedichte. Leipzig 1779-82, 3 Bde.; 3. Aufl., Frankfurt am Main 1821, 4 Bde.
- Lieder zweier Liebenden, Leipzig 1777; 3. Aufl. Leipzig 1819

== Editorial works ==
- Journal von und für Deutschland, edited by Sigmund von Bibra and Leopold Friedrich Günther von Goeckingk. Frankfurt am Main 1784 (von Bibra alone from 1792)
- Reise des Herrn von Bretschneider nach London und Paris, nebst Auszügen aus seinen Briefen an Herrn Friedrich Nicolai. Berlin 1817
- Friedrich Nicolai's Leben und literarischer Nachlaß. Berlin 1820

== Bibliography ==
- Jakob Franck (1879). "Göckingk, Leopold Friedrich Günther v.". Allgemeine Deutsche Biographie (in German). Vol. 9. Leipzig: Duncker & Humblot. pp. 306–308.
- Adalbert Elschenbroich (1964). "Goeckingk, Leopold Friedrich Günther von". Neue Deutsche Biographie (in German). Vol. 6. Berlin: Duncker & Humblot. pp. 510–511.
