= Thomas Abbt =

German philosopher, mathematician and writer (1738–1766)

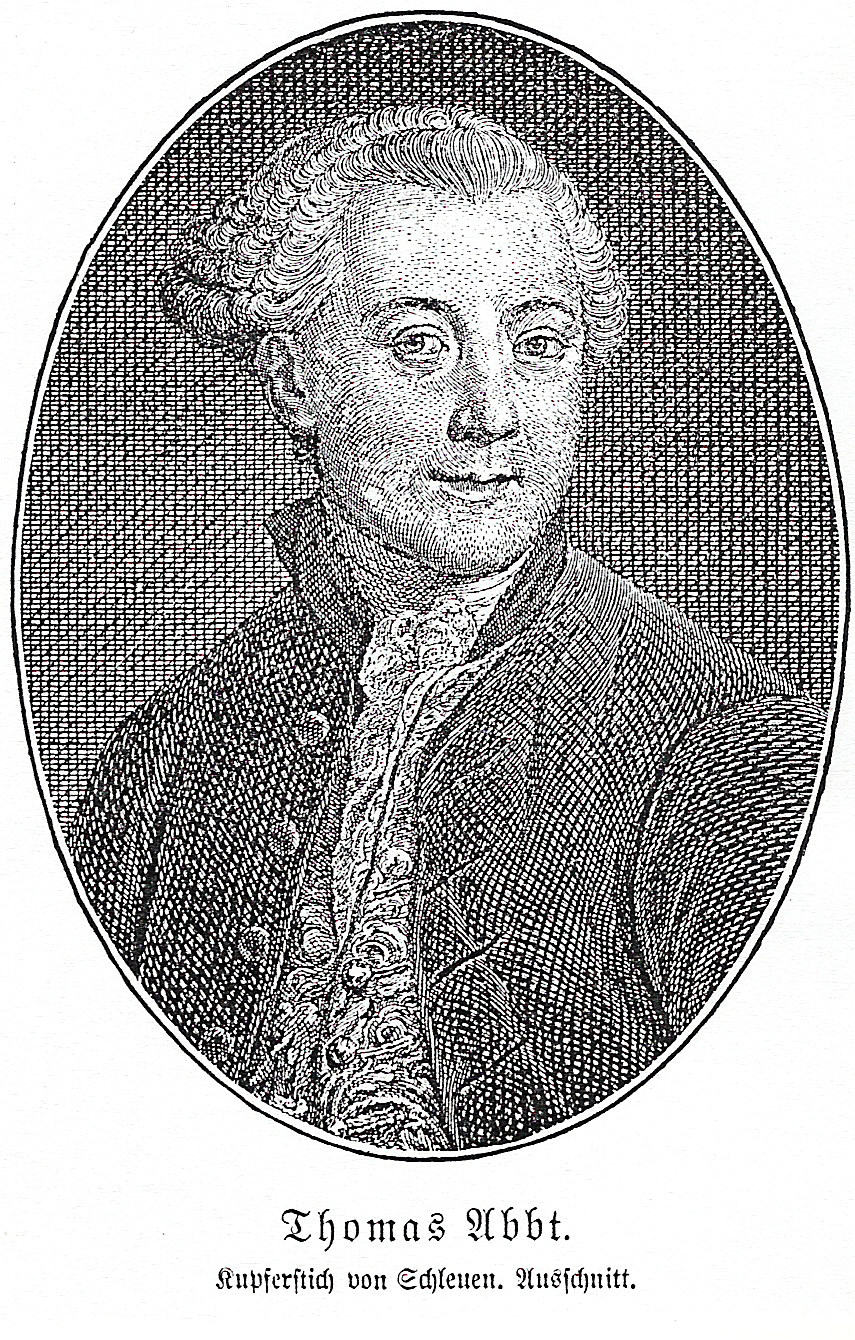
- Born: 25 November 1738; Ulm, Holy Roman Empire
- Died: 3 November 1766 (aged 27); Bückeburg, Holy Roman Empire

Thomas Abbt (German: [apt]; 25 November 1738 – 3 November 1766) was a German mathematician and writer.

== Education ==
Born in Ulm as the son of a wig-maker, Abbt visited a secondary school in Ulm, then moved in 1756 to study theology, philosophy and mathematics at the University of Halle, receiving a Magister degree in 1758. Abbt was a student of Georg Friedrich Meier and Johann Andreas Segner. Abbt was taught English by Segner. One year after submitting his doctoral dissertation Abbt received the formal permission to teach.

== Career ==
In 1760 Abbt was appointed as an associate professor of philosophy at the University of Frankfurt (Oder), where he wrote his most well-known work Vom Tode für's Vaterland (1761).

This highly patriotic tract thematises Frederick II's defeat at Kunersdorf. It also drew the attention of the editors of the famous Literaturbriefe (Literary Letters), started by Gotthold Ephraim Lessing. He contributed a large number of historical, political, esthetical and philosophical essays. Abbt was a fervent admirer of Lessing and seconded his educational, prosaic style of writing.

In autumn 1761 he was appointed as full professor of mathematics in Rinteln. In 1763, he entered a competition that was sponsored by the Berlin Academy for an essay on the application of mathematical proofs to metaphysics. Among the competitors were Moses Mendelssohn, who won, and Immanuel Kant. While in Rinteln, Abbt wrote his other famous work, Vom Verdienste (1765).

He travelled for nine months to France, where he was able to speak with Voltaire in Ferney. He also climbed in the Alps of Savoy. This travel and the disapproval of the life at the university raised his urge to trade the Theory for the Life.

While dealing with the idea to become a historian, he was offered in 1765 at the same time a professorship at the University of Marburg and a post as Councillor of the Court at the court of Count Wilhelm von Schaumburg-Lippe. He decided for the latter. The count was highly interested in the plans of Thomas Abbt, which included a history of Maximilian and a translation of Sallust among others.

However, in 1766, the twenty-seven-year-old Abbt suddenly died of an intestinal illness in Bückeburg. Of him Herder wrote that he "died for Germany and for his language too early!"

== Abbt on sabbatical ==
Thomas Abbt wanted to grapple the exigencies of German social and intellectual life in a novel fashion. His work was an early attempt to create a space in which it became possible for individuals to think, talk, and act in reference to a larger socio-political whole. As Abbt finished up his studies, he took his professorship at the University of Frankfurt in 1760, where he began to work on "Dying for the Fatherland" in 1761. In early 1763 Abbt obtained the permission from his employer for a one year sabbatical. On his travels to Switzerland he visited Justus Möser, Johann Wilhelm von Archenholz, Friedrich Karl von Moser, Johann Daniel Schöpflin, and Isaak Iselin.

A lot of Abbt's work was an attempt to get the public life in the German society to act more for the good of the country, where he tries to motivate the people that anyone can be great. Even though he tries to motivate the people of Germany with words, Abbt is convinced that we have no one in Germany who equals his talent or can not even compare someone else to his writing. As he was concerned between the human heart and social utility, Abbt continued his word and his patriotism had a way to a fairly wide range of philosophy. He insisted on grounding moral discussion in the common understanding of the mass of human kind.

Abbt's writing is much different from normal writing, everything he writes, he has a goal within it to send a message. He envisions a type of writing that leaves a lasting impression on the reader, as he tries to make the reader go into his or her resolution and action. His writing is clear that he writes with the literature of an awakening, as he tries to motivate his readers to make a lasting and meaningful impact on the world, which is a big part on why he wrote "On Dying for the Fatherland".

== Abbt's beliefs ==
In his writings he likes to express that there is an enlightened judgement for moral behavior and discussion. Within moral behavior, comes equality and Abbt emphasizes how the great women of the world are made of the same stuff as the great men. He believes that women should be relevant members of the informal public sphere, as it will bring good-heartedness and good-will. This is where here pushes for equality as he believes all help is needed, no matter what gender. Abbt also emphasizes that true religion is very strong, not a weakness, which will help transition things into a common good. As he believes that greatness is generally "in-born", it makes him less interested in reducing everyone to the same level, and would rather show how everyone can contribute.

He argued that patriotism in modern monarchies could be grounded in an aesthetic passion of enthusiasm generated through sensuous examples of great virtue. As Abbt believes this, he wants people in Germany to love their country and defend it as he wants everyone to do something good and impactful to benefit their homeland or "fatherland".

== Understanding Abbt's writing ==
Abbt was a different type of writer in his time, his primary audience was the middle and higher orders in Germany. After his death in 1770, he was honored for his writing on "Problem of Publikum", where he described and taught pure virtue along with innocence. This writing of his began to evolve as it was looked at as a vision which seemed to hold unlimited promise. In understanding Abbts writing, it is important to realize that there was a relationship between the German public sphere and the Enlightenment discourse within it. His vision of the informal public sphere existing more or less independently of government based on natural, human impulses, resonates with Shaftesbury in this regard.

In Abbt's book "On Dying for the Fatherland", he attempts to show a sense of public-spiritedness among his fellowship in every order. The love for a Fatherland is a big message that Abbt writes, where he writes for a stronger impetus to sacrifice, then it is a desire for honor, and Abbt tries to show how that is possible. It is hard to pick up certain points in his writing, as explained, but Abbt makes connections by numerous rhetorical flourishes and examples drawn from history within social orders in monarchical society, reorienting citizenship around a political virtue. He wants his readers to be able to take what he is saying from this book and take action in becoming a stronger community or whole. Abbt argues that love of fatherland is a greater spring to action in polity; to enable souls in a polity by honoring the love of fatherland. With more souls taking actions, the stronger and more love the fatherland will feel, which could lead them to be more successful. This was a main message throughout the book, as he wanted to show a new way of thinking between individuals and society.

The example of King fighting for his country on the battlefield that Abbt wrote about was to inspire monarchical subjects to follow his example as well as regenerate patriotism. He wrote as a pervasive patriotic culture of remembrance and emulation of dead heroes.

== Who influenced or was influenced by Abbt ==
Aufklärer like Abbt were concerned with nurturing a healthy social organism with their own individual development and emancipation. Other writers and philosophers such as Prussian philosopher Immanuel Kant tried tying "Enlightenment" directly to "Problem of Publikum", but found difficulty in the isolated individual. This project was begun by Abbt, which was carried on by Immanuel Kant and Johann Gottfried Herder who had different thoughts on it. Herder differed from Kant's more rationalist project, but the statues of the "Problem of Publikum" was a problem of the Aufklärer and of modern German history.

In the early 1760s Abbt and Moses Mendelssohn had been engaged in a translation of Shaftesbury, as they express their interest in the "public" as the measure of all "true" virtue. Alexander Pope has an impact on Abbt through his visions of world and society as an ordered whole, which helped influence him to write "On Dying for the Fatherland". Abbt argues that Pope's teaching point to him was "the principle that makes us obedient to the creator, and into citizens of the whole world". Certain principles that Abbt wanted to take away from Pope were that he wanted the German people to either take leadership or make sure they obey their leader, in the good for their country. In Abbt's short life, the figure of Frederick the Great looms over the text in this regard as Abbt admired him very much. He was then able to rise to the top of German academic life, to a position of an enlightened administration, as he "died for Germany and for his language too early" as he was looked at as a true positive influential model to the German society.

== Main message sent to his readers ==
Between Abbt's two famous works of "On Dying for the Fatherland (1761) and "On Merit" (1765), he tries to "overcome the basic German problem of a fragmented public sphere with enlightened argument designed to lead readers to locate themselves and their well-being in an enlarged societal frame." As he tried to fix this German problem within the public, his enlightened argument is pointed at people in leadership positions or people that have the opportunity to make a difference, in doing something positive for their community around them.

Abbt wrote that Germans lack a common interest, as he asks about the "volk" even though you are not supposed to ask about the "volk" as you are supposed to let it be as it has to pay for its dues. But, he wanted to show his readers what not to do by mentioning them.

The main message he wanted to get to his readers in "On Dying for the Fatherland", was to rouse fellow-citizenship to sacrificial duty for their Fatherland. Just like "The Merit", this novel brings readers a sense of their place or role in a larger society. Abbt emphasizes the equality of all members of society, as it is a common theme that also leads into "The Merit". He keeps this common theme present because he believes that the characteristics of great women, are found in great men as well, which helps influence his readers to take positive actions. Another main message from the novel of "On Dying for the Fatherland" was to sacrifice duty to their fatherland, reading in context of the Seven Years' War. This war had a large impact on Abbt, as it occurred while he made his most famous wiritngs, and was a present event for a quarter of his lifetime. The Seven Years' War was also an event that influenced Abbt's writing, especially "On Dying for the Fatherland", which is why he discusses protecting your homeland so much, along with encouraging people to take action in making positive impacts. He wanted to bring his readers to a sense of their place or role in the larger societal whole, by inspiring virtuous action based. Abbt's purpose was to help the reader see the presence of a fatherland in "well-ordered monarchies".

As Abbt reassures the reader that there is no reason to worry about dissolution of the corporate orders in the novel, "On Dying for the Fatherland" the readers have their own reasons for being that will continue to justify their existence. He also touches base a lot on citizenship, as he describes that in a state of war that nothing during the war takes away from their bonds. Abbt, Moses Mendelssohn, and Shaftesbury wanted to emphasize the social solidarity to the readers to make sure that if their readers are taking their writing seriously, that they will take action in creating a psychological sense of unity in groups or classes.

== Abbt receiving recognition ==
Abbt was honored for being the writer of "The Publikum" and a teacher of virtue and innocence, where people understood his points and listened to them. He took Professorship in Philosophy in 1760, which is when he wrote famous novel, "On Dying for the Fatherland", brought Abbt a lot of instant recognition. After writing it, he came into contact with Aufklärer and Moses Mendelssohn, who asked him to become a regular contributor to the "letters concerning the newest literature". In accepting this offer, Abbt's work became more public and often more present to readers eyes, where he could have easier access in influencing people. This novel also gave him the title of a full professorship in mathematics at the University of Rinteln.

In 1765, when Abbt published his famous and most important work of "The Merit", it brought interest from Margrave of Schaumburg-Lippe the enlightened Prince at the time offered Abbt a position in court. He accepted this offer and spent the last year of his life working with the Prince. The Prince bestowed on him the office on counsellor of the court, regency, and consistory of Buckeburgh. The Margrave of Schaumburg-Lippe caused Abbt to be interred, with great pomp, in his private chapel, and honoured his tomb by an affecting epitaph from his own pen.

In Abbt's life he rose to the top of German academics at such a young age which moved to a position of enlightened administration and free scholarly activity. He had so much going for him at the age of 28 as he could have influenced so many more people and learned much more if it were not for the sudden illness that led to his death.

== References and sources ==
Sources

- Allgemeine Deutsche Biographie - online version at Wikisource
- Eva Piirimäe, "Dying for the fatherland: Thomas Abbt's theory of aesthetic patriotism," History of European Ideas, 35,2 (2009), 194–208.
