= Berlinische Monatsschrift =

Periodical literature

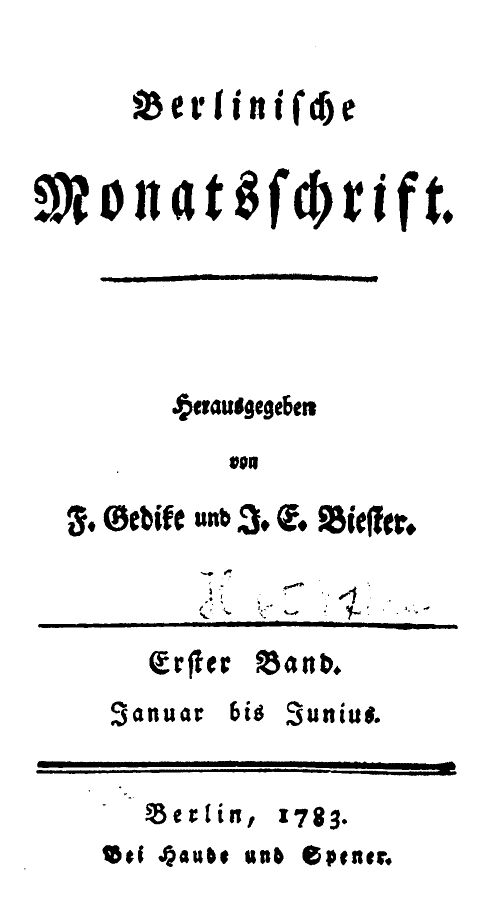
Cover, 1783

The Berlinische Monatsschrift was a monthly magazine published by Johann Erich Biester and Friedrich Gedike (though the latter resigned his editorship in 1791).

It served primarily as the mouthpiece for the Berliner Mittwochsgesellschaft (Berlin Wednesday Society). It is considered Immanuel Kant's preferred magazine, mainly due to its debate on the question of 'What is Enlightenment?'

The magazine was initially published between 1783 and 1796. This was succeeded by the Berlinische Blätter, published by Biester, between 1797 and 1798. It was then revived by Friedrich Nicolai, who published it as Neue Berlinische Monatsschrift from 1799 until 1811.

In 1998 all 58 editions of the Berlinische Monatsschrift, plus its successors, amounting to approximately 30,300 pages, were digitised by the library of the Bielefeld University.

== See also ==
- Answering the Question: What is Enlightenment?
- Christoph Friedrich Nicolai
