= Gleimhaus =

Coordinates: 51.8965°N 11.0497°E

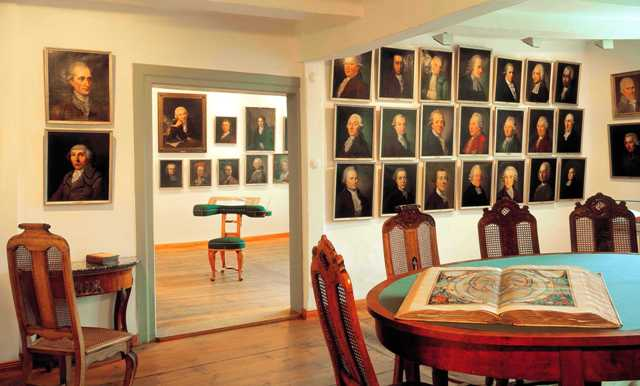
Gleimhaus-Freundschaftstempel

The Gleimhaus – Museum der deutschen Aufklärung (Gleim House – Museum of the German Enlightenment), in Halberstadt, is one of the oldest literary museums in Germany. It was built in 1862 in the former home of the poet and collector Johann Wilhelm Ludwig Gleim (1719–1803). The half-timbered house lies behind the choir of the gothic cathedral to Halberstadt. The collections of the Gleimhaus go back to Gleim's estate.

== Johann Wilhelm Ludwig Gleim ==
Gleim was a popular poet in his time. His poetry collection Versuch in Scherzhaften Liedern, from 1744 or 1745 is one of the most important early documents of German anacreontics. His "Romanzen" (1756) worked on the ballad seal of the Sturm und Drang generation. His Prussian war songs, written in 1757, were a milestone in the effort to bring the popular into German poetry. His fable seals can still be found in textbooks. Nevertheless, from a modern perspective, Gleim appears more as a transitional figure in German literary history, having been overtaken by recent literary developments since the 1770s.

He continues to have paramount importance as a patron, collector and exponent of the friendship cult of his time. Gleim came to Halberstadt in 1747 to become "Domsekretär", d. H. Administrator of the cathedral pin, to become. Supported by a social-ethically oriented friendship ideals, Gleim created a network of literary communication and, in addition to the representatives of the Literary Society, made Halberstadt a literary center in Germany.

== The collection ==
Gleim's collections are characterized by a unique connection between images, books and letters, and are in the service of his intense group of friendship; the collections became the property of the "Gleim Family Foundation" and were earmarked for public use.

Gleim created a large portrait collection of writers and important contemporaries of the 18th century. While he at first only had his close friends painted, the circle of people painted expanded over the decades. At his death, the number of portraits was about 150; Today, the Gleimhaus preserves around 130 portrait paintings of 18th and early 19th century personalities, including portraits of Ewald von Kleist, Karl Wilhelm Ramler, Johann Joachim Winckelmann, Gotthold Ephraim Lessing, Klopstock, Anna Louisa Karsch, Sophie von La Roche, Johann Jakob Bodmer, Salomon Gessner, Wilhelm Heinse, and Jean Paul.

Many of the most important portraitists of the second half of the 18th century are represented by one or more works, such as Anton Graff, Jens Juel, Georg Oswald May, Benjamin Calau, Gottfried Hempel, several members of the Tischbein family, Johann Friedrich Eich, Friedrich Georg Weitsch, Johann Heinrich Ramberg, and Georg Friedrich Adolph Schöner.

Gleim's socialization led to an immense letter archive. Correspondents included the writers Lessing, Klopstock, Wieland, Ewald von Kleist and Herder, the poet Anna Louisa Karsch, the painter Bernhard Rode, the theologian Spalding and the esthetician Sulzer and the count's house Stolberg-Wernigerode. The manuscript collection of the Gleimhaus contains a total of around 10,000 letters from more than 500 correspondence from Gleim (originals, designs and contemporary transcripts, including more than 2,000 copies by Gleim, otherwise correspondence or letters from correspondence of the Gleim friends with third parties). There are also over 1,000 manuscripts (poetic bequests by Johann Wilhelm Ludwig Gleim, Jakob Immanuel Pyra, Ewald von Kleist, Johann Benjamin Michaelis, partial estate of Anna Louisa Karsch, occasional manuscripts by Friedrich Gottlieb Klopstock, Johann Peter Uz, Lessing, Ramler, Heinse, Johann Heinrich Voss and others). Moreover, Gleim's personal documents and his family are occasionally found, including some wallpaper left over from Gleim's summerhouse with handwritten notes by his friends.

The convivial, scholarly, friendly and literary correspondence in North and Central Germany during the second half of the 18th century, concentrating on the connection between image, book and letter, is exemplified in the museum.

Gleim's largely preserved book collection is considered one of the largest private bourgeois libraries of the 18th century; it comprises about 12,000 volumes, including over 50 incunabula, about 800 titles of the 16th century, about 1,200 of the 17th century. The largest part dates from the 18th and early 19th centuries, including numerous dedication copies. The library has its focus in European literature of the second half of the 18th century and also contains larger collections on literary and art history, economic, social, cultural and political history and natural sciences.

These collections are the largest closed poetic estate of the 18th century at the historical site in the original collection conception and can be considered as the first literary archive of German works. The portrait collection and the letter archive are accessible via the homepage of the Gleimhaus.

== History ==
After Gleim's death, his grandnephew and estate administrator Friedrich Wilhelm Körte (1776–1846) kept his collections in his home, as well as in the cathedral square in Halberstadt. He later published them. After his death, the holdings in the Domgymnasium were stored until the Gleim Family Foundation in 1861 bought the former home Gleim and made the collections in 1862 under the name "Gleimhaus" publicly accessible.

The holdings were expanded by the Family Foundation and the Gleimhaus. Thus, in the second half of the 19th century, a part of the graphic, book and manuscript collection of the Halberstadt Oberdompredigers Christian Friedrich Bernhard Augustin (1771–1856) was incorporated into the stock of the Gleimhaus. It has also built its own collection of prints and drawings, which today contain around 12,000 sheets and cover the period from the end of the 15th century to the present, with a focus on 18th and 19th century portrait graphics. In 1898, the family foundation sold the house and the collections to the city of Halberstadt, which operated the Gleimhaus until the end of 1994. For its part – within the available financial resources – it provided for the collection the creation of a scientific library.

At the beginning of the 20th century, the monument to Anna Louisa Karsch by J. C. Stubinitzky, which had been erected in the landscape park "Spiegelsberge" near Halberstadt in 1784 as the first poet monument in Germany in the form of a portrait statue, was transferred to the Gleimhaus.

During the Second World War about one-sixth of the historical book inventory as well as a few manuscripts and pictures were destroyed. The building of the Gleimhaus was also damaged by an attack on Halberstadt on 8 April 1945. The museum was reopened in August 1946. In the autumn of 1949, the exhibition "From this world rose Goethe" was presented at the Käthe-Kollwitz-Gymnasium Halberstadt.

During the 20th century several estates of 19th and 20th century artists from the region of Halberstadt arrived the Gleimhaus. Selected works from this collection will be presented in a "Gallery of Artists of the Region".

In 1994, a museum extension for the Gleimhaus with magazine rooms, a reading room, an event and meeting room as well as a paper restoration workshop was completed.

Educational offers and a varied program of events for adults and children aim to bring life to the former Gleim residence, as it did in the 18th century. Since 1999, scientific conferences have been held in the Gleimhaus in cooperation with specialist colleagues from universities and museums. This includes workshops for junior researchers and student seminars.

== Museum presentation ==
The heart of the museum's presentation of the Gleimhaus is the so-called "Temple of Friendship". These are the rooms on the upper floor whose walls are densely covered with Gleim's portrait paintings and in which festivals and readings took place in the circle of friends during his lifetime. On display are also books and manuscripts from the collections of the Gleimhaus and Gleim's original writing chair. In a special room, children can experience the 18th century with all their senses.

== Awards ==
In 2004, the honorary pin of the city of Halberstadt "Silver Roland" was awarded to the Förderkreis Gleimhaus Registered Association. In 2005, the Gleimhaus (together with the Museum of Prehistory, Halle) received the Museum Prize of the Ostdeutsche Sparkassenstiftung in Saxony-Anhalt. The Gleimhaus was included in the Blue Book of the Federal Government as a "Cultural Memorial Site with Special National Importance".
