= Johann Joachim Eschenburg =

German critic and literary historian (1743–1820)

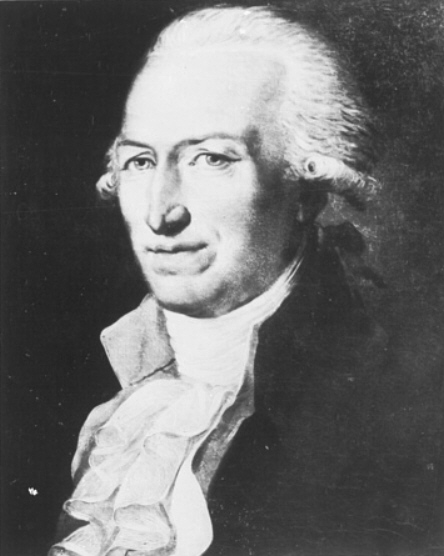
Johann Joachim Eschenburg.

Johann Joachim Eschenburg (7 December 1743 – 29 February 1820) was a German critic and literary historian.

He was born and educated at Hamburg, going on to study at the University of Leipzig and University of Göttingen. In 1767 he was appointed tutor, and subsequently professor, at the Collegium Carolinum in Braunschweig (today TU Braunschweig). The title of Hofrat was conferred on him in 1786, and in 1814 he was made one of the directors of the Carolinum.

He is best known for his efforts to popularize English literature in Germany. He published a series of German translations of the principal English writers on aesthetics, such as Charles Burney, Joseph Priestley and Richard Hurd; and also produced the first complete translation in German prose of Shakespeare's plays (William Shakespear's Schauspiele, 13 volumes, Zürich, 1775–1782). This is virtually a revised edition of the incomplete translation published by Christoph Martin Wieland between 1762 and 1766.

Besides editing, with memoirs, the works of Friedrich von Hagedorn, Zachariä and other German poets, he was the author of a Handbuch der klassischen Literatur (1783); Entwurf einer Theorie und Literatur der schönen Wissenschaften (1783); Beispielsammiung zur Theorie und Literatur der schönen Wissenschaften (8 volumes, 1788–1795); Lehrbuch der Wissenschaftskunde (1792); and Denkmäler altdeutscher Dichtkunst (1799). Most of these passed through several editions.

Eschenburg was also a poet, and some of his hymns, e.g. Ich will dich noch im Tod erheben and Dir trau ich, Gott, und wanke nicht, remain well-known.

Eschenburg became a correspondent, living abroad, of the Royal Institute of the Netherlands in 1809. In 1818 he became associated member.
