= Franz Michael Leuchsenring =

German writer (1746–1827)

- Born: 13 April 1746
- Died: February 1827 (aged 80); Paris, France
- Occupation: Writer

Franz Michael Leuchsenring (13 April 1746 – February 1827) was a German writer of the German Enlightenment.

== Life ==
In 1769, Leuchsenring with Friedrich Heinrich Jacobi, Johann Gottfried Herder, and Johann Wolfgang Goethe were known as members of the Merckschen Circle in Darmstadt. Almost all his circle broke with Leuchsenring, however, because they did not trust him. After moving to Berlin, he was briefly teacher of philosophy to Crown Prince Frederick William III of Prussia. Along with bookseller and author Christoph Friedrich Nicolai, Royal librarian Johann Erich Biester, and Moses Mendelssohn, the German Jewish philosopher, he became a member of the Berlin Wednesday Society. Later, he went to Paris, where he lived as a Jacobin and there died.

== Sources ==
- (in German) Franz Muncker, "Leuchsenring, Franz Michael", Allgemeine Deutsche Biographie (ADB), vol. 18 (Leipzig: Duncker & Humblot, 1883) pp. 473–475.
- (in German) Konrad Feilchenfeldt, "Leuchsenring, Franz Michael", Neue Deutsche Biographie (NDB), vol. 14 (Berlin: Duncker & Humblot, 1985) ISBN 3-428-00195-8, pp. 367 ff.
- (in German) Urs Viktor Kamber (Hrsg.) Briefe von und an F. M. Leuchsenring, 1746–1827 Stuttgart: Metzler, 1976) ISBN 3-932655-03-6
- (in German) Reinhard Markner, "Franz Michael Leuchsenring, "Philosoph ambulant" in Berlin und Zürich", Aufklärung 24 (2012), pp. 173–205 ISBN 978-3-7873-2407-1
