= Johann Erich Biester =

German philosopher

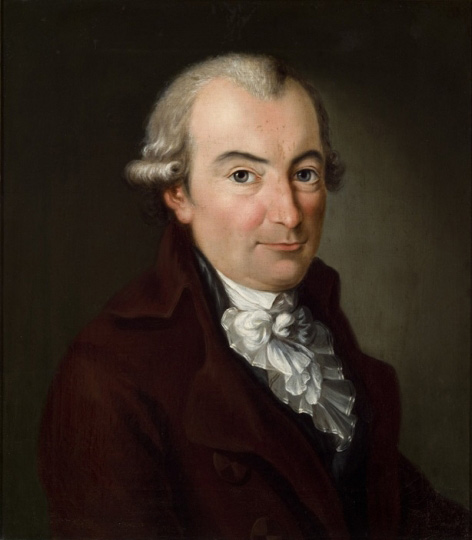
- Johann Erich Biester by Ferdinand Collmann, 1795, Gleimhaus Halberstadt
- Born: 17 November 1749; Lübeck
- Died: 20 February 1816 (aged 66); Berlin
- Resting place: Dorotheenstadt Cemetery
- Occupations: Lawyer, scholar, philosopher
- Movement: Berliner Mittwochsgesellschaft

Education
- Education: University of Göttingen

Philosophical work
- Era: Age of Enlightenment
- Region: German philosophy
- School: Socinianism, Deism
- Language: German
- Notable works: Berlinische Monatsschrift

Johann Erich Biester (17 November 1749, in Lübeck – 20 February 1816, in Berlin) was a German lawyer, scholar and Enlightenment philosopher. Friedrich Nicolai and Friedrich Gedike, he formed what was known as the 'Triumvirate' of late Enlightenment Berlin.

== Life ==
Johann Erich Biester was a German lawyer, scholar, and philosopher. Born in Lübeck as the fifth son of the wealthy silk merchant Ernst August Biester who came from Hanover, and his wife Margarethe Eilsabeth Hake, a granddaughter of the Lübeck scholar Jacob von Melle, Biester displayed an early interest in history and literature, distinguishing himself from his merchant brothers.

=== Early Education and Academic Pursuits ===
Biester attended the Katharineum in Lübeck and studied law and English literature at the University of Göttingen from 1767 to 1771, where he befriended the poet Gottfried August Bürger. After completing his studies, he worked as a lawyer in Lübeck and contributed to scholarly journals. In 1773, he earned a doctorate in law from the University of Bützow, and received a teaching position as a preceptor at the Pädagogium Bützow (Mecklenburg), which he relinquished in 1975. He also temporarily held a position as an educator in the house of the hereditary land marshal von Lützow in Eickhof.

=== Career in Prussia and Enlightenment Advocacy ===
In 1777, Biester moved to Berlin to serve as state secretary to Karl Abraham Freiherr von Zedlitz, the Prussian Minister of Culture. A dedicated freemason, he joined the Berlin Wednesday Society under the pseudonym "Axiomachus" (i.e. fighter for the just cause) and was a member of the Lawless Society. Biester became a prominent figure in Enlightenment circles, advocating against the spread of occultism and irrational sentimentalism, and vehemently opposed the proselytizing efforts of Catholic and Jesuit groups.

From 1783, he co-edited the Berlinische Monatsschrift with educationalist Friedrich Gedike, who resigned from the editorial board in 1791. Biester later edited the Berlinische Blätter and the Neue Berlinische Monatsschrift until 1811. His publications often addressed Enlightenment ideals and rational thought.

=== Librarian and Public Service ===
In 1784, Biester was appointed librarian of the Royal Library in Berlin by King Frederick II of Prussia, eventually becoming its director. His tenure emphasized scholarly accessibility and the promotion of knowledge. He also served as a civil servant and was active in Freemasonry, holding the position of "Grand Orator" of the Grand Lodge of the Freemasons of Germany until his death. He was a Master of the Chair of the local lodge "Zum goldenen Pflug," serving from 1789 to 1816.

=== Friendship with Immanuel Kant ===
Biester maintained a close friendship with the philosopher Immanuel Kant, visiting him in Königsberg in 1791. Their correspondence and interactions reflected Biester's commitment to Enlightenment philosophy and intellectual exchange.

=== Death and legacy ===
Biester died in Berlin in 1816 at the age of 66 and was buried in the cemetery of the Dorotheenstädtische and Friedrichswerdersche Gemeinden on Chausseestraße. His grave has not been preserved.

== Enlightenment Ideals and Philosophical Discourse ==
Biester's advocacy for Enlightenment thought is evident in his controversial essay Proposal that the clergy should no longer be involved in performing marriages (de: "Vorschlag, die Geistlichen nicht mehr bei Vollziehung der Ehen zu bemühen“), published in the Berlinische Monatsschrift in 1784. This essay aligned with the Protestant Socinian movement and Unitarian Deism, challenging traditional religious practices. That same year, Immanuel Kant’s seminal article What is Enlightenment? appeared in the same journal, reflecting the period's vibrant intellectual atmosphere.

In the 1790s, Biester actively defended Kant’s work against increasing censorship under King Friedrich Wilhelm II's government. When Kant’s essays on religion were censored, Biester submitted a direct petition (Immediatgesuch) to the king, advocating for intellectual freedom and opposing censorship which had been tightened. However, his efforts were thwarted by the Prussian minister Johann Christoph von Wöllner (1732-1800), who aimed to suppress Enlightenment ideas and even sought to exile Biester and his colleague Friedrich Gedike.

=== Intellectual Alliances and Influence ===
Biester maintained close friendships with influential figures such as Wilhelm and Alexander von Humboldt. Towards the end of his life, he collaborated with Alexander von Humboldt at the Prussian Academy of Sciences in Berlin, joining its philological class in 1798 despite significant resistance due to Prussian censorship.

In the broader European intellectual context, Biester sided with the Enlightenment thinker Thomas Paine in the debate against conservative Edmund Burke, as represented in Germany by Friedrich von Gentz. Biester's support for Paine underscored his commitment to Enlightenment values of reason and progress.

As a librarian and scholar, Biester championed young philologists and literary figures, including Friedrich August Wolf, Philipp Buttmann, Friedrich de la Motte Fouqué, Karl August Varnhagen von Ense, and Karl Friedrich Klöden.

=== Opposition to Johann Gottlieb Fichte ===
Despite his Enlightenment sympathies, Biester strongly opposed the philosophy of Johann Gottlieb Fichte, a prominent Kantian philosopher. On this point he was in agreement with his friend Friedrich Nicolai, against whom Fichte vehemently polemicised. Biester criticized Fichte’s radical reinterpretation of Enlightenment thought, which emphasized striving for absolute knowledge rather than challenging existing prejudices. Biester and Nicolai jointly opposed Fichte’s appointment to the Prussian Academy of Sciences, effectively blocking his admission in the philosophical class.

== Bibliography ==
- Alken Bruns, "Johann Erich Biester", in Biographisches Lexikon für Schleswig-Holstein und Lübeck, Band 12 Neumünster 2006, p. 34 ff. ISBN 3-529-02560-7
- Karl H. Salzmann, "Biester, Johann Erich", in Neue Deutsche Biographie (NDB). Vol. 2, Duncker & Humblot, Berlin 1955, ISBN 3-428-00183-4, p. 234
- Alfred Hass, "Johann Erich Biester. Sein Leben und sein Wirken. Ein Beitrag zur Geschichte der Aufklärungszeit in Preussen". Diss. phil., Universität Frankfurt a. M., 1925.
- Alfred Hass, "Johann Erich Biesters Bedeutung für das Geistes - und Bildungsleben Preußens während der Aufklärungszeit", in Die Deutsche Schule. Monatsschrift. Im Auftrage des Deutschen Lehrervereins, 30 (1926), pp. 602–611, 667–676, 730–740.
- Ernst Kelchner, "Biester, Johann Erich", in Allgemeine Deutsche Biographie (ADB). Band 2, Duncker & Humblot, Leipzig 1875, S. 632 f.
- Bernd Horlemann and Hans-Jürgen Mende (eds.), Berlin 1994. Taschenkalender, Edition Luisenstadt Berlin, Nr. 01280; Seiten zwischen 16. und 17. Januar: Nicolais genauester Freund
