= Friedrich Gedike =

German theologian and teacher (1754–1803)

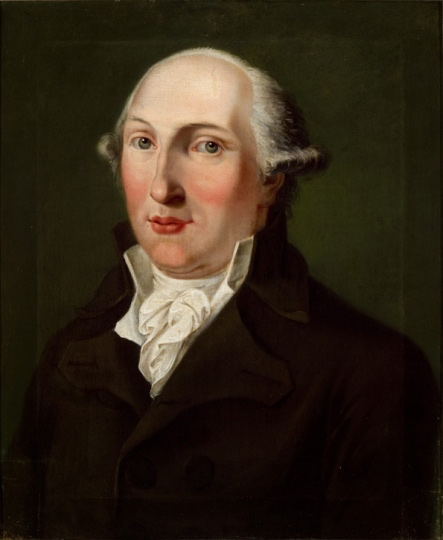
Friedrich Gedike by Ferdinand Collmann, 1791, Gleimhaus Halberstadt

Friedrich Gedike (15 January 1754, Boberow bei Karstädt (Prignitz) (Mark Brandenburg) – 2 May 1803, Berlin) was a German theologian, teacher and educational reformer of the late Age of Enlightenment. He was the recipient of the letters that made up the book by C. P. Moritz entitled Journeys of a German in England in 1782.

== Life ==
Gedike came from an old family of theologians. His grandfather, Lambert Gedicke, was the Feldpropst (chief military chaplain) of the Prussian Army, and Simon Gedi(c)ke, Chief Chaplain to the Prince-Elector, Joachim II Hector, Elector of Brandenburg. Ludwig Gedike, later headmaster of the Leipzig Bürgerschule, Ludwig Gedike, was Friedrich's younger brother.

== Works ==
- Aristoteles und Basedow. 1779
- Schulschriften., two volumes, 1789 and 1795
- Vermischte Schriften. 1801

== Bibliography ==
- Heinrich Julius Kämmel: Gedike, Friedrich. In: Allgemeine Deutsche Biographie (ADB). Band 8, Duncker & Humblot, Leipzig 1878, S. 487–490.
- Fritz Borinski: Gedike, Friedrich. In: Neue Deutsche Biographie (NDB). Band 6, Duncker & Humblot, Berlin 1964, ISBN 3-428-00187-7, S. 125 f. (Digitalisat).
- Gerd Biegel: „Dieser Professor ist ganz unnütz für die Universität“. Die braunschweigische Landesuniversität Helmstedt im Bericht des „Universitätsbereisers“ Friedrich Gedike aus dem Jahr 1789 (= Braunschweiger Museumsvorträge. Bd. 4). Braunschweigisches Landesmuseum, Braunschweig 2003, ISBN 3-927939-61-7.
- Elena Barnert: Headhunter Seiner Majestät. Der „Universitäts-Bereiser“ Friedrich Gedike evaluiert Deutschlands Professoren für Preußens Universitäten. In: Rechtsgeschichte. Bd. 4 (2004), S. 256−263.
- Andreas Fritsch: Fríedrich Gedike wiederentdeckt. Ein großer „Philologe und Schulmann“ des 18. Jahrhunderts. In: Forum Classicum. Bd. 3 (2008), S. 166–179.
