= Johann Jakob Engel =

German author (1741–1802)

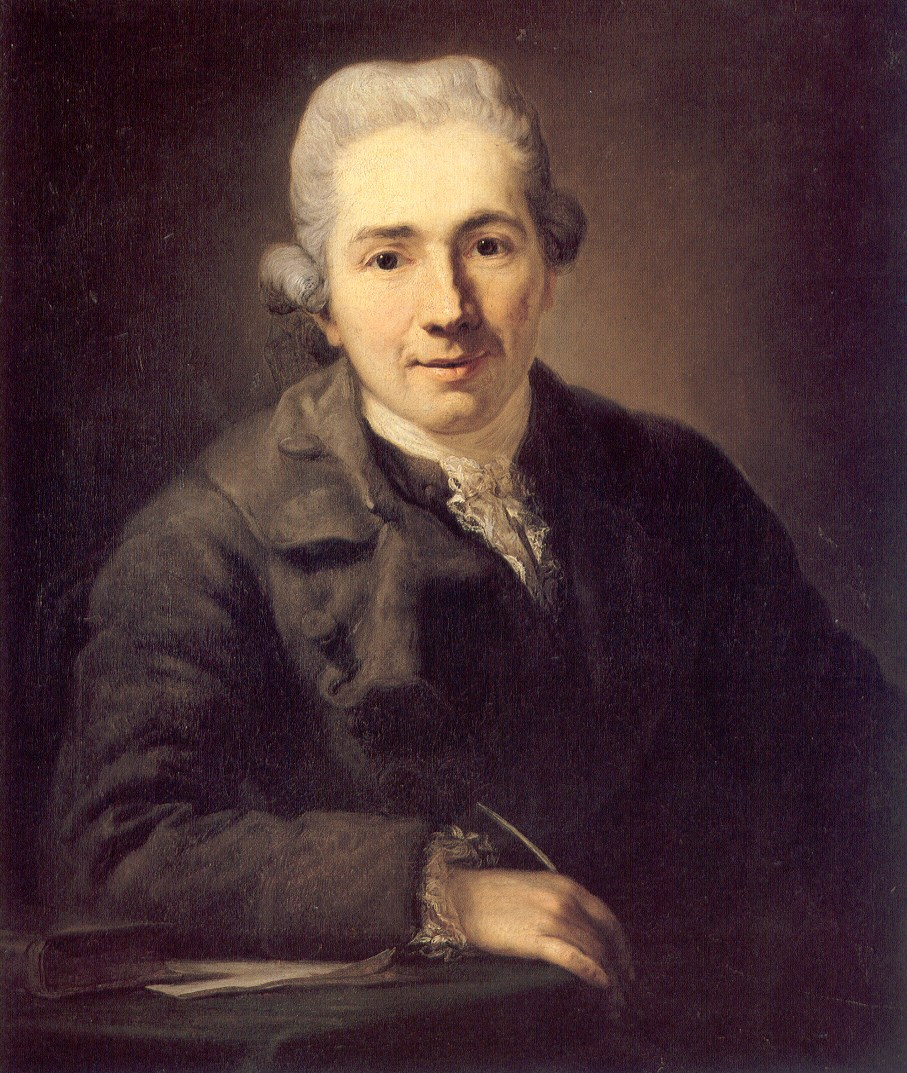
Johann Jacob Engel (1773)

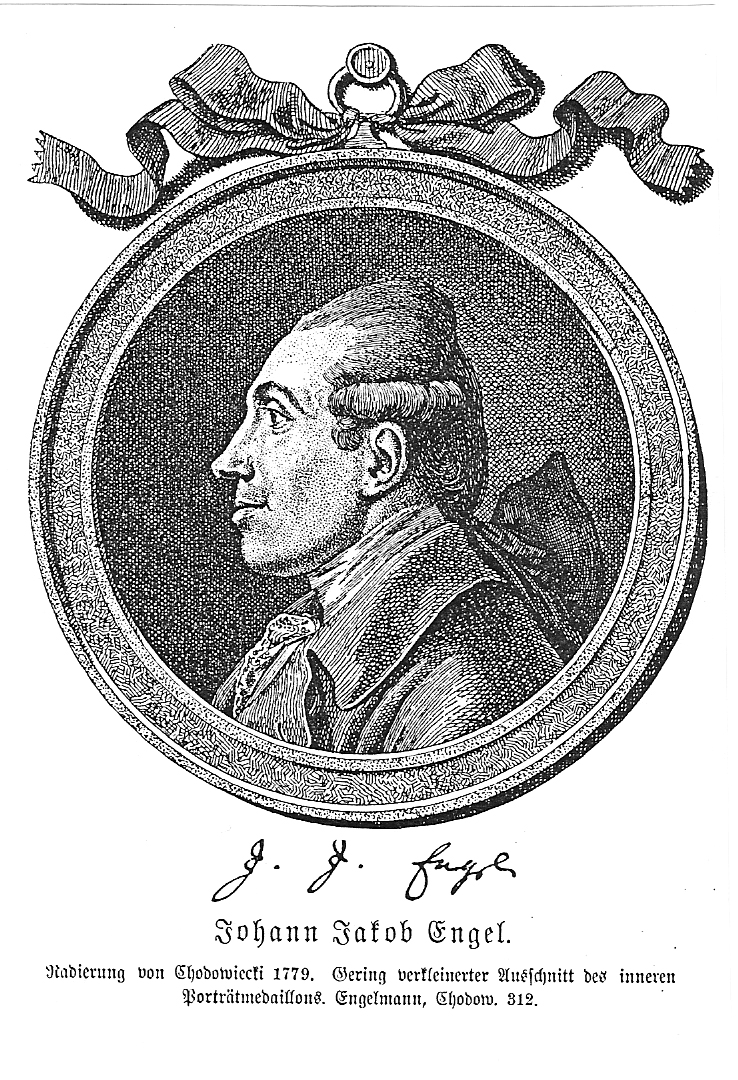
Johann Jakob Engel, portrait by Chodowiecki

Johann Jakob Engel (11 September 1741 – 28 June 1802) was a German author.

== Life ==
Engel was born and died in Parchim, in the Duchy of Mecklenburg-Schwerin. He studied theology at Rostock and Bützow, and philosophy at Leipzig, where he took his doctors' degree. In 1776 he was appointed professor of moral philosophy and belles-lettres in the Joachimstal gymnasium at Berlin, and a few years later he became tutor to the crown prince of Prussia, afterwards Frederick William III.

The lessons which he gave his royal pupil in ethics and politics were published in 1798 under the title Fürstenspiegel ("Mirror for Princes"), and are a favourable specimen of his powers as a popular philosophical writer. In 1787 he was admitted a member of the Academy of Sciences of Berlin, and in the same year he became director of the royal theatre, an office he resigned in 1794.

== Works ==
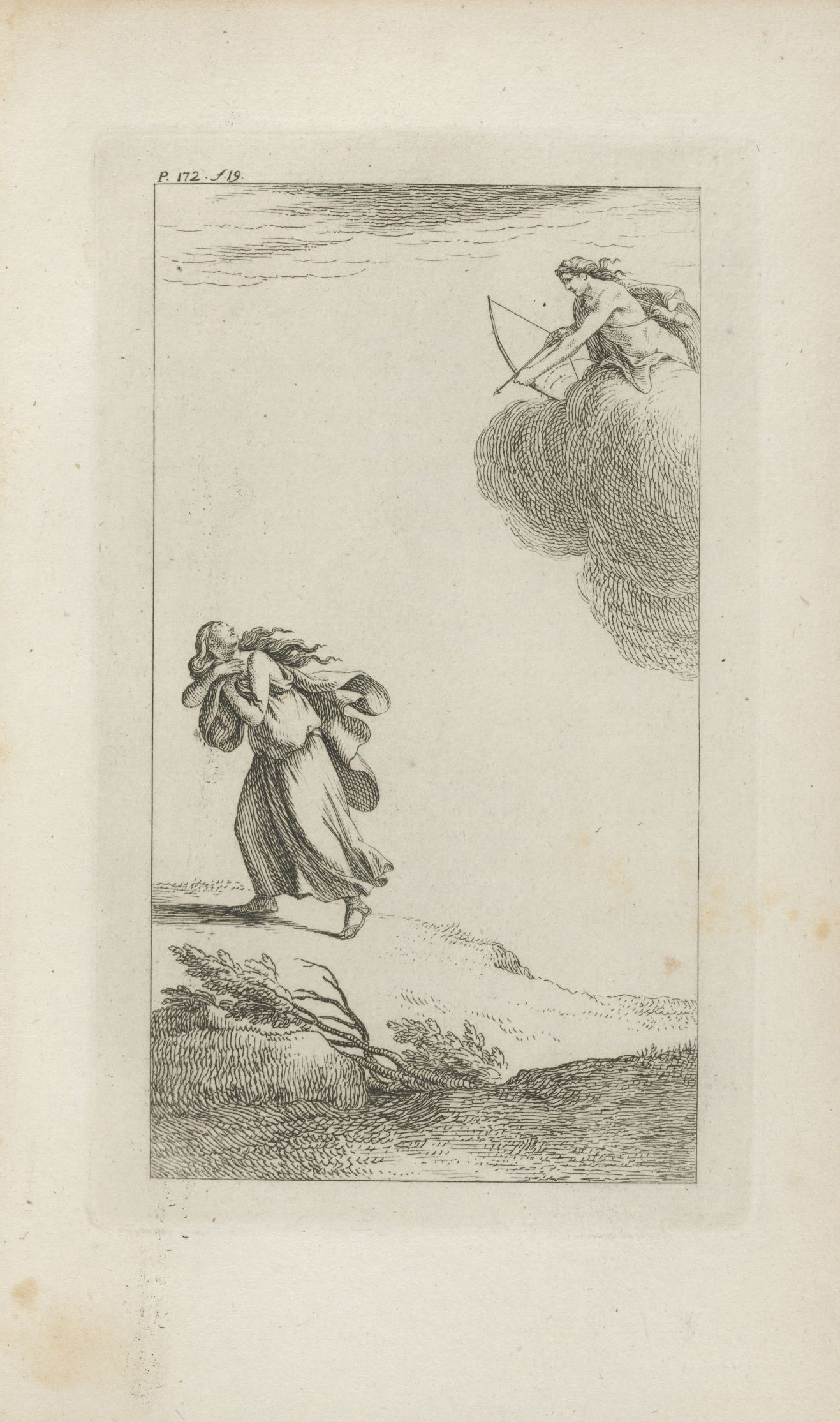
Illustration from Ideen zu einer Mimik, 1785

Besides numerous dramas, some of which had a considerable success, Engel wrote several valuable books on aesthetic subjects. His Anfangsgründe einer Theorie der Dichtungsarten ("Initial foundations for a theory of poetry types," 1783) showed fine taste and acute critical faculty if it lacked imagination and poetic insight. The same excellences and the same defects were apparent in his Ideen zu einer Mimik (1785), written in the form of letters. It demonstrated a knowledge of human nature, and may be regarded as a kind of manual for actors.

His most popular work was Der Philosoph für die Welt (1775), which consists chiefly of dialogues on men and morals, written from the utilitarian standpoint of the philosophy of the day. His last work, a romance entitled Herr Lorenz Stark (1795), achieved a great success, by virtue of the marked individuality of its characters and its appeal to middle-class sentiment.

He wanted to make the German theatre the mirror of the national life, and he wrote several plays, but they were of little merit – Der dankbare Sohn and Edelknaben are examples.

Engel's Sämtliche Schriften (complete writings) were published in twelve volumes at Berlin in 1801–1806; a new edition appeared at Frankfort in 1851.
