= Bernhard Rode =

German artist and engraver (1725–1797)

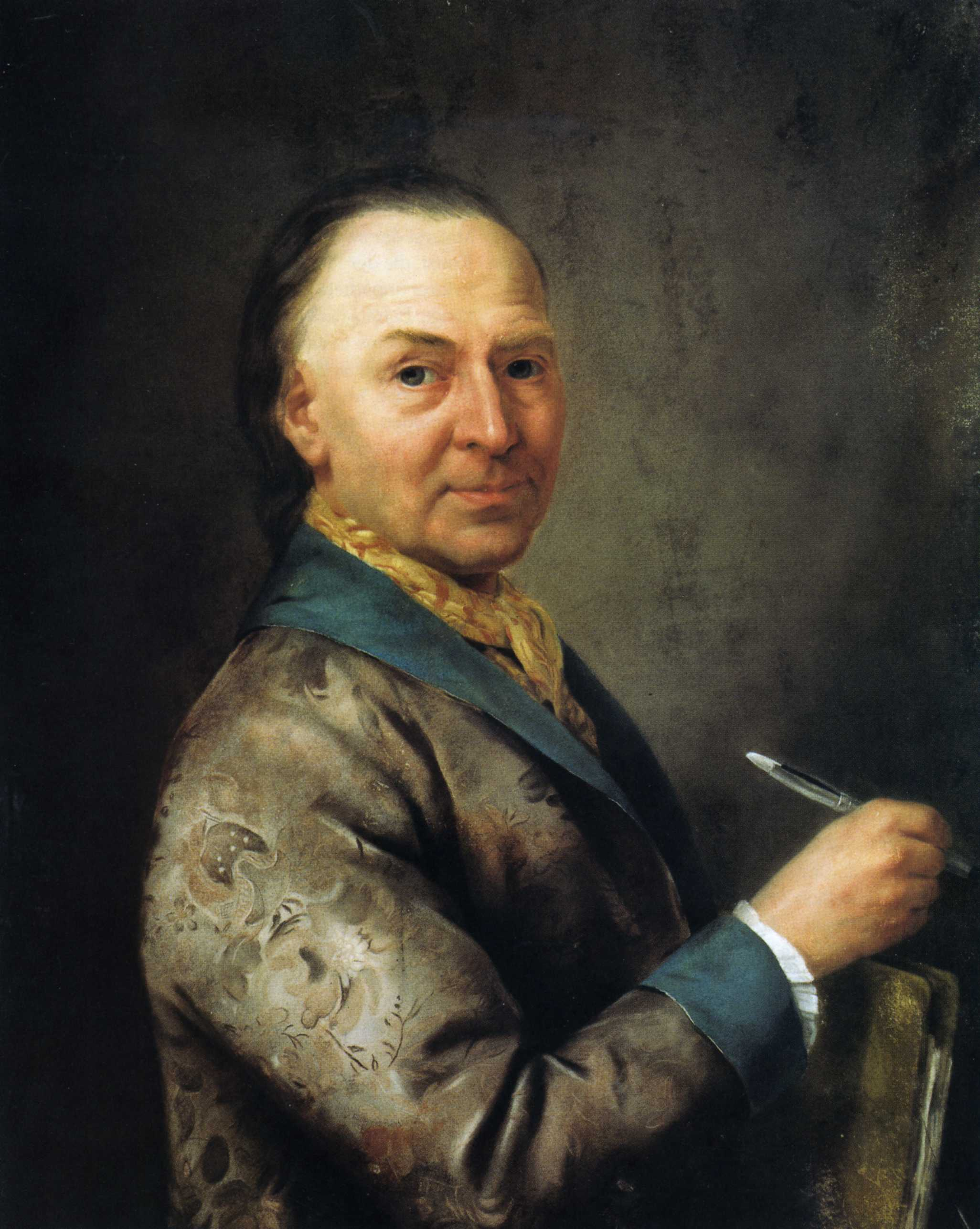
Bernhard Rode, painted by his contemporary Henriette-Félicité Tassaert.

Bernhard Rode (25 July 1725 – 28 June 1797) was a Prussian artist and engraver well known for portraying historical scenes and allegorical works. He knew most of the central figures in the Berlin Enlightenment as Friedrich Nicolai and Gotthold Lessing, and the philosophical and political discussions of the Berlin Philosophs informed much of the subject matter of his artistic work. His paintings include several works depicting, in various guises, the King of Prussia Frederick the Great, who ruled the Prussia during much of Rode's lifetime. Rode was director of the Berlin Academy of the Arts from 1783 until his death in 1797.

== Family and early training ==
Rode was the son of the goldsmith Christian Bernhard Rode and his wife, Anna Sophie. The copper engraver Johann Heinrich Rode and the sculptor Philipp Rode were his brothers. He received his earliest artistic training from his father and his earliest training in drawing from a painter, N. Müller. His four-year education at the studio of the court painter Antoine Pesne, an influential painter in Berlin and Brandenburg, was important to his professional development. During his apprenticeship, he learned to paint portraits. In 1748, Rode began a study trip of several years. He spent 18 months in the studio of Jean Restout and Charles André van Loo (sometimes known as Carle van Loo or Vanloo). He became acquainted with Jean-Baptiste-Henri Deshays and developed his talent and interest in the medium of history painting. In Venice and Rome, he studied the old masters. In 1755 or 1756, he returned to Berlin, and he married Sophie Luise, but the earliest years of their marriage remained childless. Of his earliest years in Berlin, not much more is known.

== Career ==
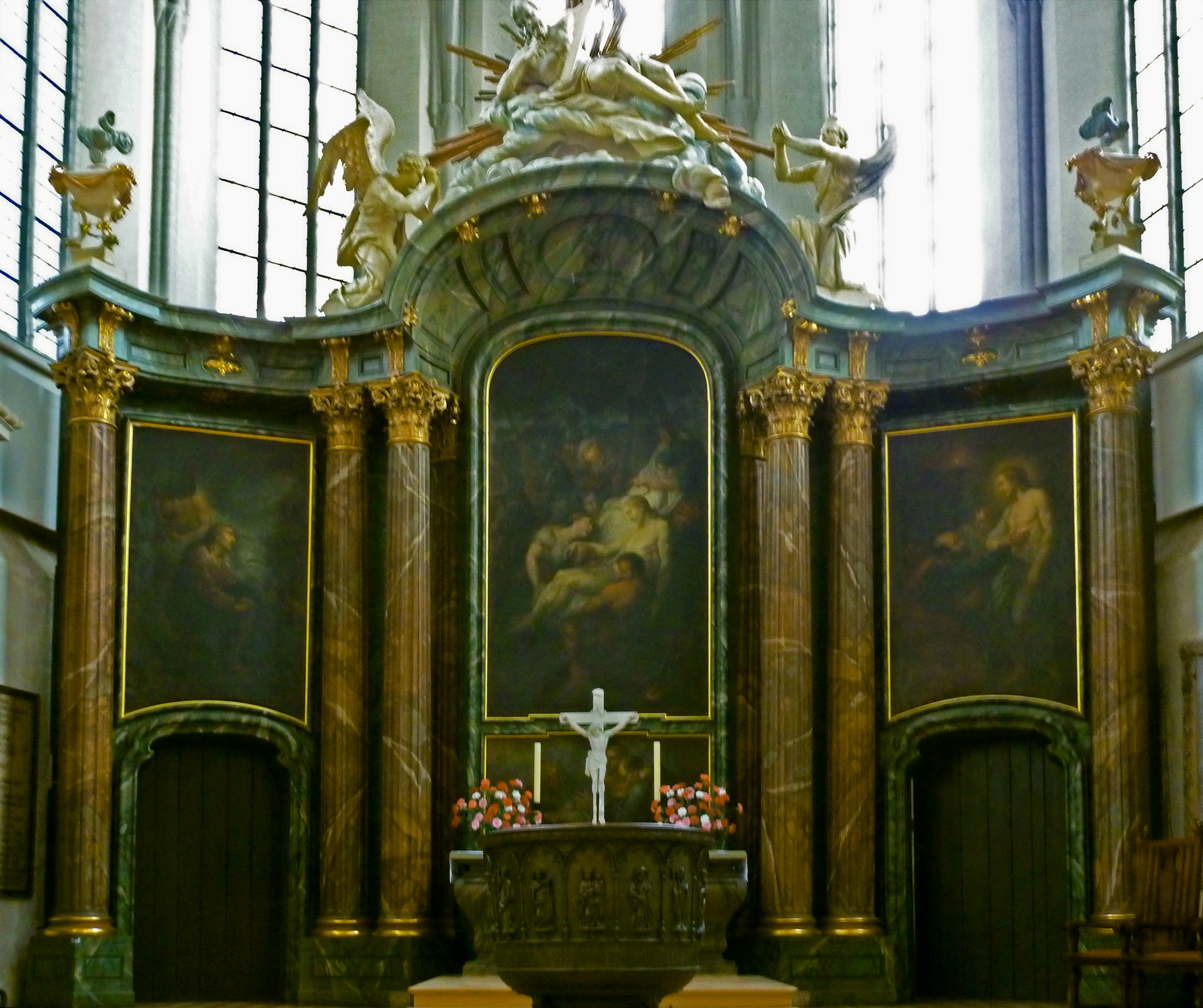
Altar pictures, Marienkirche Berlin

Through a life-long annuity from the estate of his father, Rode was financially independent, especially important in the years when was he establishing himself professionally and artistically. Thanks to this annuity, Rode was able to explore techniques, themes and formats on his own time, rather than be constrained by the demands of a patron. He painted and donated the Altar pictures still on view in his parish church, the Marienkirche in Berlin-Mitte. He also portrayed a fictional version of the Emperor of China in a series of paintings.

Because he studied at the Berlin Academy of the Arts, he received instruction from its directors, Blaise Nicholas Le Sueur and Daniel Chodowiecki. Beginning in 1785, he developed health problems, although he remained active until shortly before his death. Upon his death in 1797, he was buried in the cemetery of the Saint Nicholas and Saint Mara parishes, in Berlin's Königsstadt, to which he had donated much of the artwork.

Beginning in 1756, Rode belonged to the Berlin Academy of the Arts, and in 1783 he succeeded Le Sueur as its director. His long-time friend, Daniel Chodowiecki, also a member of the Academy, supported the appointment. He and his colleagues at the Academy hoped to take the Academy in a new direction and suggested a ten-year project entitled "The Soldier King" (German: Der Soldatenkönig). The project received support from Frederick II's nephew and heir, Frederick William II. In the course of the project, Rode painted several historical depictions of the Soldier King, Frederick the Great. These were displayed in a special exhibit in 1795. Under the patronage of Frederick William II, Chodowiecki himself took over the important post of the Academy director after Rode's death in 1797.

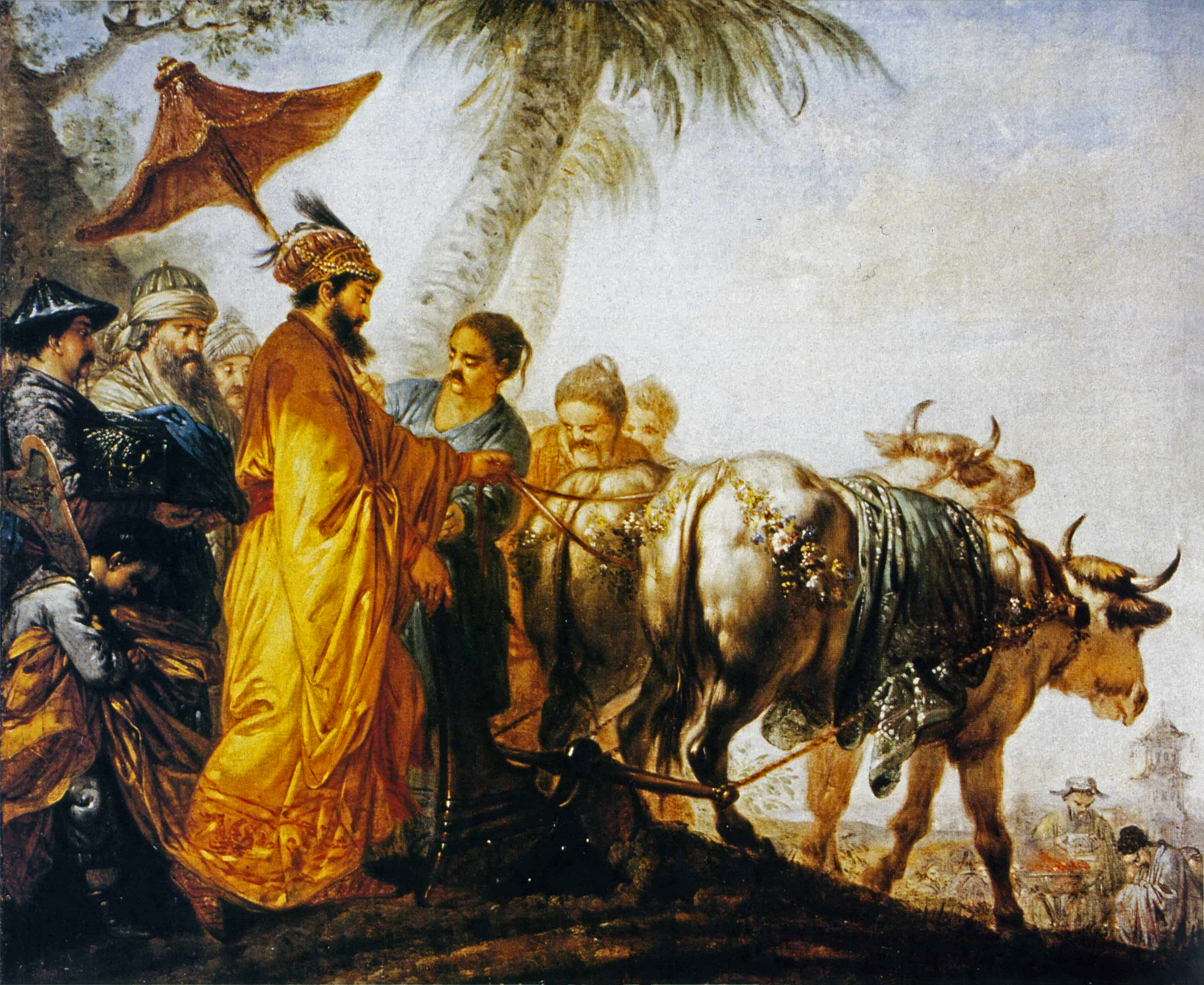
Rode's depiction of the Emperor of China

== Place in the Berlin Enlightenment ==
Central to the Berlin Enlightenment, Rode was by 1750 part of a learned society of friends, including the publisher and bookseller Friedrich Nicolai, the poet and philosopher Karl Wilhelm Ramler, the philosophes Johann Georg Sulzer and Thomas Abbt, and also Gotthold Ephraim Lessing and Moses Mendelssohn. They pursued literary and literary interests often linked with the goal of civil emancipation; at the same time, they were loyal and patriotic to the State of Prussia. The union of the civil enlightenment with the state of Prussia and its king bespoke their underlying national goals, and they also sought to advance German language and literature. Although Rode did not belong to the innermost core of this intellectual circle, he counted many of its members among his close friends, and among them he developed the goals and basis of his artistic work.

== See also ==
- War of the Bavarian Succession

== Bibliography ==
- Lee, Thomas H. C. China and Europe: images and influences in sixteenth to eighteenth centuries. University of Hong Kong Press, 1991.
- Berlin Art Academy, "Friedrich der Große und der Feldscher um 1793–94, von Bernhard Rohde." Katalog der Akademieausstellung von 1795. Berlin, 1795.

Preceded by Blaise Nicholas Le Sueur	Director; Berlin Academy of Art; 1785–1797	Succeeded by Daniel Chodowiecki
