= Émile Louis Vernier =

French painter

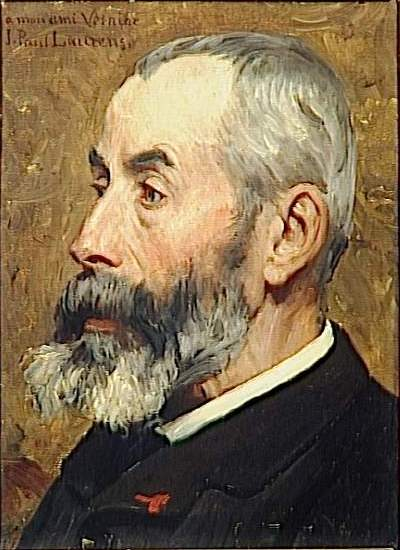
- Portrait of Vernier by Jean-Paul Laurens
- Born: 29 November 1829; Lons-le-Saunier, Jura, France
- Died: 24 May 1887 (aged 57); Paris, France
- Occupations: Painter and lithographer

Émile Louis Vernier (29 November 1829 – 24 May 1887) was a French painter and lithographer. He was known for his marine scenes.

== Life ==
Émile Louis Vernier was born on 29 November 1829 in Lons-le-Saunier, Jura. The family moved to Besançon where his father owned the Café Granvelle. He was enrolled in the Royal College of Besançon, for a military career, but was allowed to move to the Besançon school of drawing, and then to enter the studio of Collette, a well-known lithographer. He submitted his work to the Paris Salon for the first time in 1857, with several lithographs after Maurice Sand.

Vernier married Maria Vauthier on 27 June 1861. In 1867 he exhibited two paintings of the country around Besançon and several lithographs after Jean-Jacques Henner, Jean-Joseph-François Tassaert and Gustave Courbet. These demonstrated his great ability in adapting to the style of different artists. He would receive several medals from the Salon, and in 1869 and 1870 was a member of the admission committee for the etching and lithography section. He visited Spain in 1872 with the landscape artist Paul Vayson. In 1873 he won a medal at the Vienna World Exposition. He visited Venice in the spring of 1874. In 1880 he won a second class medal at the Salon, and had a great success at the Besançon exhibition.

Émile Louis Vernier died in Paris on 24 May 1887. He is buried in the Père Lachaise Cemetery in Paris.

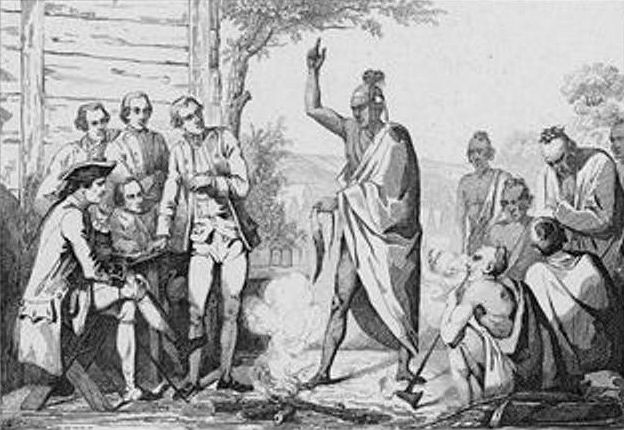
Conference Between French and Indian Leaders Around a Ceremonial Fire

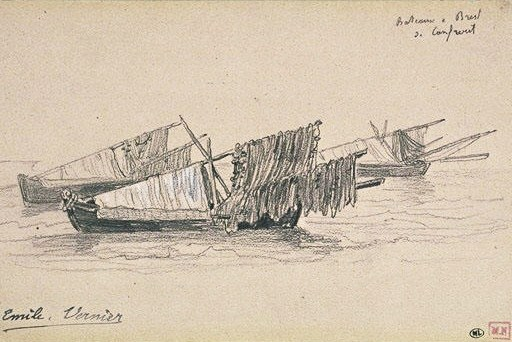
Three fishing boats

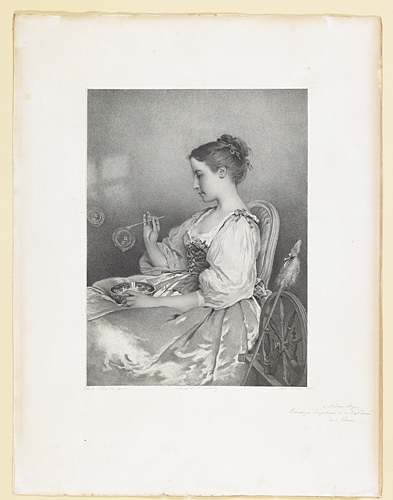
Soap bubbles after Charles Joshua Chaplin

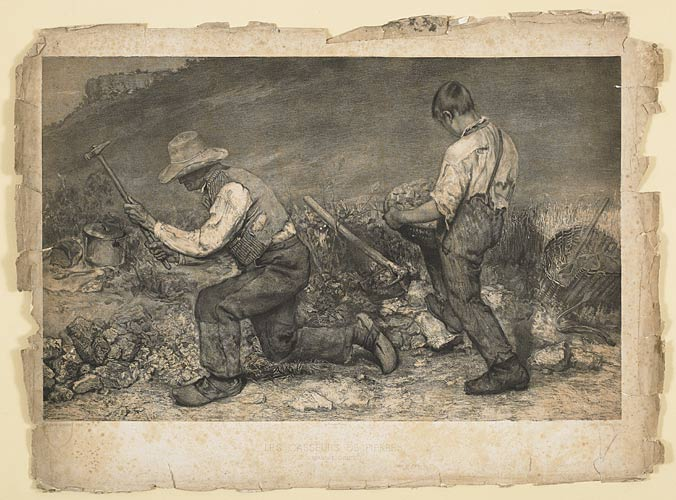
Stone breakers after Gustave Courbet

== Sources ==
- Bénézit, E. (1999). Dictionnaire des peintres, sculpteurs, dessinateurs et graveurs, Nouvelle édition sous la direction de J. Busse. Vol. 4. Gründ.
- Guillemin, V. (1905). Émile Vernier, Artiste lithographe et peintre de marines, sa vie, son œuvre, Typographie et lithographie. Besançon: Jacquin.
