= Johann Michael Siegfried Löwe =

German painter

- Born: Moses Samuel Löwe; 24 June 1756; Königsberg, Prussia
- Died: 10 May 1831 (aged 74); Königsberg, Prussia
- Education: Berliner Akademie

Johann Michael Siegfried Löwe (24 June 1756 – 10 May 1831), born Moses Samuel Löwe, was a Prussian painter and engraver.

== Biography ==
Löwe was born into a Jewish family in Königsberg, Prussia, in 1756. From 1770 to 1774 he studied at the Berliner Akademie under Blaise Nicholas Le Sueur, Daniel Chodowiecki, and Johann Christoph Frisch. He was later a student of Giovanni Battista Casanova and Anton Graff in Dresden.

Aided by the friendship and influence of the Friedländer family, he had achieved such a reputation by 1780 that the empress Catherine II of Russia commissioned him to paint her portrait. His pictures were among the most popular in the German exhibitions, and he was one of the foremost miniaturists and pastel-painters of his time.

In 1806–7 Löwe published the series Bildnisse jetzt lebender Berliner Gelehrten mit ihren Selbstbiographien, which included portraits of Christoph Wilhelm Hufeland, Johann Elert Bode, and Lazarus Bendavid, among others. It was praised by Goethe.

He was also a chess master and a Freemason.
