= Jean-Joseph-François Tassaert =

French painter and engraver

- Arrestation de Robespierre (transl. Arrest of Robespierre) — At the centre of the image, Gendarme Merda fires at Maximilien Robespierre
- Born: 1765; Paris, Kingdom of France
- Died: 3 August 1838 (aged 72–73); Paris, Kingdom of France
- Known for: Engraving
- Children: Octave Tassaert
- Father: Jean-Pierre-Antoine Tassaert
- Relatives: Henriette-Félicité Tassaert sister
- Family: Tassaert family

Jean-Joseph-François Tassaert (1765 – 3 August 1838) was a French painter and engraver. He is best known for his engravings depicting events of the French Revolution based on paintings by Fulchran-Jean Harriet.

== Biography ==
Jean Joseph François Tassaert was the son of the sculptor Jean-Pierre-Antoine Tassaert and his wife, Marie Edmée Tassaert, née de Moreau (1736–1791). In 1775, he moved with his parents to Berlin, where he received drawing instruction alongside his mother and his two sisters, Henriette-Félicité and Antoinette. Having completed his training, he moved to London in 1786 to live with his uncle, the painter and engraver Philippe Joseph Tassaert. There, he learned the stipple engraving technique under Francesco Bartolozzi, and befriended Bertalozzi's son, Gaetano Stefano. After his father’s death in 1788, he returned to Berlin.

In 1792, Tassaert and his wife settled in Paris. While in Paris, he produced several engravings depicting events of the French Revolution. From 1798 onward, he placed his artistic talents at the service of Napoleon, creating numerous engravings of Napoleon himself, and of various generals and marshals of the Empire. He was one of 80 engravers who contributed to the renowned Description de l'Égypte (Description of Egypt), a monumental work on ancient Egyptian artefacts published in Paris between 1809 and 1829. Tassaert died in Paris on 3 August 1838. He was the father and teacher of the French painter Octave Tassaert.

== Works ==
- La nuit du 9 au 10 thermidor An II. Arrestation de Robespierre. — After Fulchran-Jean Harriet, Paris, colour engraving, now in the Musée Carnavalet.
- Le 31 may 1793. — After Fulchran-Jean Harriet, published in Paris by Jacques-Louis Bance around 1800–1805.
The Last words of Joseph Chalier in the prisons of Lyon, 1794, engraved by Tassaert after Jacques-Philippe Caresme, Bibliothèque nationale de France, Paris

The Insurrection of 31 May 1793, 1800, engraved by Tassaert after Fulchran-Jean Harriet, Bibliothèque nationale de France, Paris

Victory leads to Immortality, c. 1793, engraved by Tassaert after Paul-André Basset, Musée Carnavalet, Paris

Love for the Fatherland inspires Courage, c. 1793, engraved by Tassaert after Paul-André Basset, Musée Carnavalet, Paris

Napoleon, 1806, engraved by Tassaert after Michel François Damane-Demartrais, Bibliothèque nationale de France, Paris

== Bibliography ==
- Leclerc, Guy. "Biographie du graveur Jean Joseph François Tassaert 1765-1838". memoiredesartistes.free.fr.
