= Johann Jacob Rabe =

Johann Jacob Rabe (born January 16, 1710, in Lindflur; died on February 12, 1798, in Ansbach) was a German (non-Jewish) translator of the Mishnah and the Talmud. He was city chaplain in Ansbach (Onolzbach).

Moses Mendelssohn, a prominent philosopher, once remarked on Rabe's remarkable patience and scholarly prowess: "This man is a strong Talmudist," wrote Moses Mendelssohn to Herder under date of Dec. 3, 1771, "and I wonder at his patience. He has translated into German the first three parts of the Babylonian and the Jerusalem Talmud, as he informs me, and has them ready for the printer, but can find no publisher for them."

In 1761, Rabe applied the expression "From Moses to Moses there never arose one as great as Moses" to Moses Mendelssohn, drawing a parallel between Mendelssohn and the great medieval Jewish philosopher Moses Maimonides. This phrase, originally coined to praise Maimonides, was used by Rabe to highlight Mendelssohn's significant contributions to philosophy and theology at the young age of thirty-two. This reference is noted in Micah Gottlieb's work, Faith and Freedom: Moses Mendelssohn's Theological-Political Thought.

Rabe's works include the following:

- "Mischnah oder Text des Talmuds; aus dem Ebräischen Uebersetzt, Umschreiben und mit Anmerkungen Erläutert," Ansbach, 1760 et seq. (reviewed by M. Mendelssohn; see his "Gesammelte Schriften," iv. 2, 134 et seq.)
- "Der Prediger Salomo, mit einer Kurzen und Zureichenden Erklärung nach dem Wortverstande zum Nutzen der Studirenden von dem Verfasser des 'Phädon'; aus dem Hebräischen Uebersetzt von dem Uebersetzer der Mischnah,". A translation and explanation of Ecclesiastes, published in 1771.
- "Der Talmudische Traktat Berachoth von den Lobsprüchen, als das Erste Buch im Ersten Theil nach der Hierosolymitischen und Babylonischen Gemara; aus dem Ebräischen Uebersetzt und mit Anmerkungen Erläutert," A translation of the Talmudic tractate on blessings, published in Halle in 1777.
- "Der Talmudische Traktat Peah von dem Ackerwinkel, Uebersetzt und Erläutert, Nebst einer Abhandlung von Versorgung der Armen," A translation of the tractate on the corner of the field, published in Ansbach in 1781..

== Jewish Encyclopedia bibliography ==
- Friedrich Nicolai, Beschreibung einer Reise durch Deutschland und die Schweiz im Jahre 1781, Berlin / Stettin 1783–1796, Volume 1. page 193;
- Fürst, Bibl. Jud. iii. 127;
- Kayserling, Moses Mendelssohn, Sein Leben und Seine Werke, 1st ed., p. 515;
- Zunz, Monatstage, p. 8.
