= Tassaert family =

Flemish family of artists

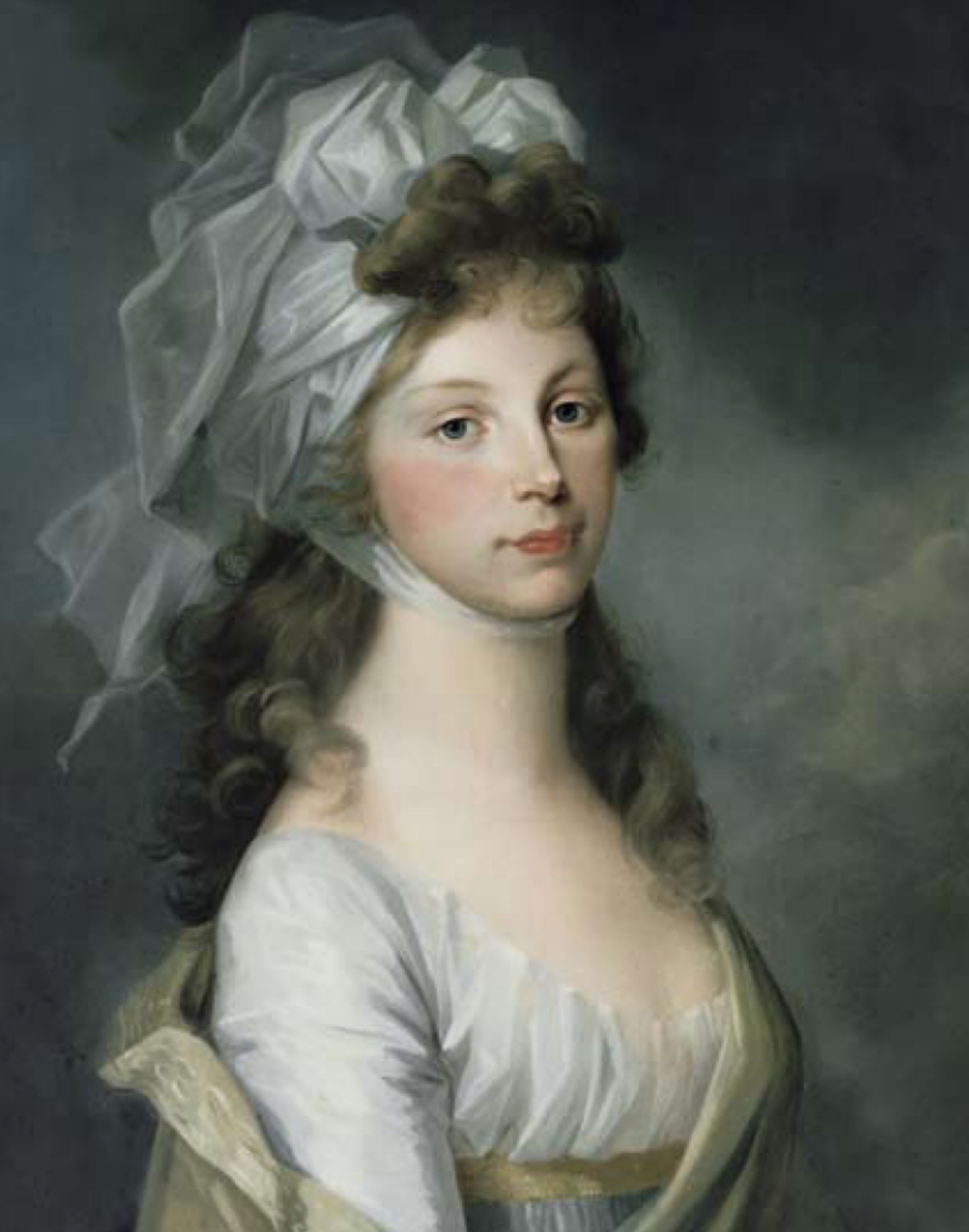
Queen Luise of Prussia by Henriette-Félicité Tassaert

The Tassaert family, originating in Antwerp, produced a number of painters, sculptors, illustrators and art dealers, some of whom later settled or worked in France and Prussia in the 17th and 18th centuries. Its members include:

- Pieter Tassaert the Elder (?- Antwerp c. 1692), painter and art dealer, received as a master into the Antwerp Guild of Saint Luke in 1635.
  - Lucas Tassaert (1635–?), painter in Antwerp, son of Pieter the Elder.
  - Maria Tassaert (1642 – after 1665), still life painter active in Antwerp, daughter of Pieter the Elder.
  - Peter Frans Tassaert (1644–1725), painter, gilder and art dealer in Antwerp, son of Pieter the Elder.
  - Jan Pieter Tassaert (1651–1725), painter, gilder and art dealer in Antwerp, son of Pieter the Elder.
    - Jean-Pierre-Antoine Tassaert (1729–1788), sculptor, Jan Pieter's grandson, born in Antwerp, worked in Antwerp, then London (1744) and Paris and finally Berlin (1775).
      - Jean-Joseph-François Tassaert (1765-1838), engraver and painter, son of Jean-Pierre-Antoine, definitely established in Paris (1792).
        - Paul Tassaert (1792-1850), French engraver, son of Jean-Joseph-François.
        - Octave Tassaert (1810-1874), French painter, son of Jean-Joseph-François.
      - Henriette-Félicité Tassaert, (1766-1818), miniaturist, daughter of Jean-Pierre-Antoine, active in Prussia.
      - Antoinette Tassaert (1768-1823), miniaturist, member of the Berlin Academy, daughter of Jean-Pierre-Antoine active in Prussia. Married chamber musician Johann Joseph Beer after which she signed her works 'Antoinette Beer'.
    - Philippe Joseph Tassaert (Antwerp 1732 - London 1803), painter and mezzotint-engraver, brother of Jean-Pierre-Antoine.
