= Johann Melchior Dinglinger =

German goldsmith (1664–1731)

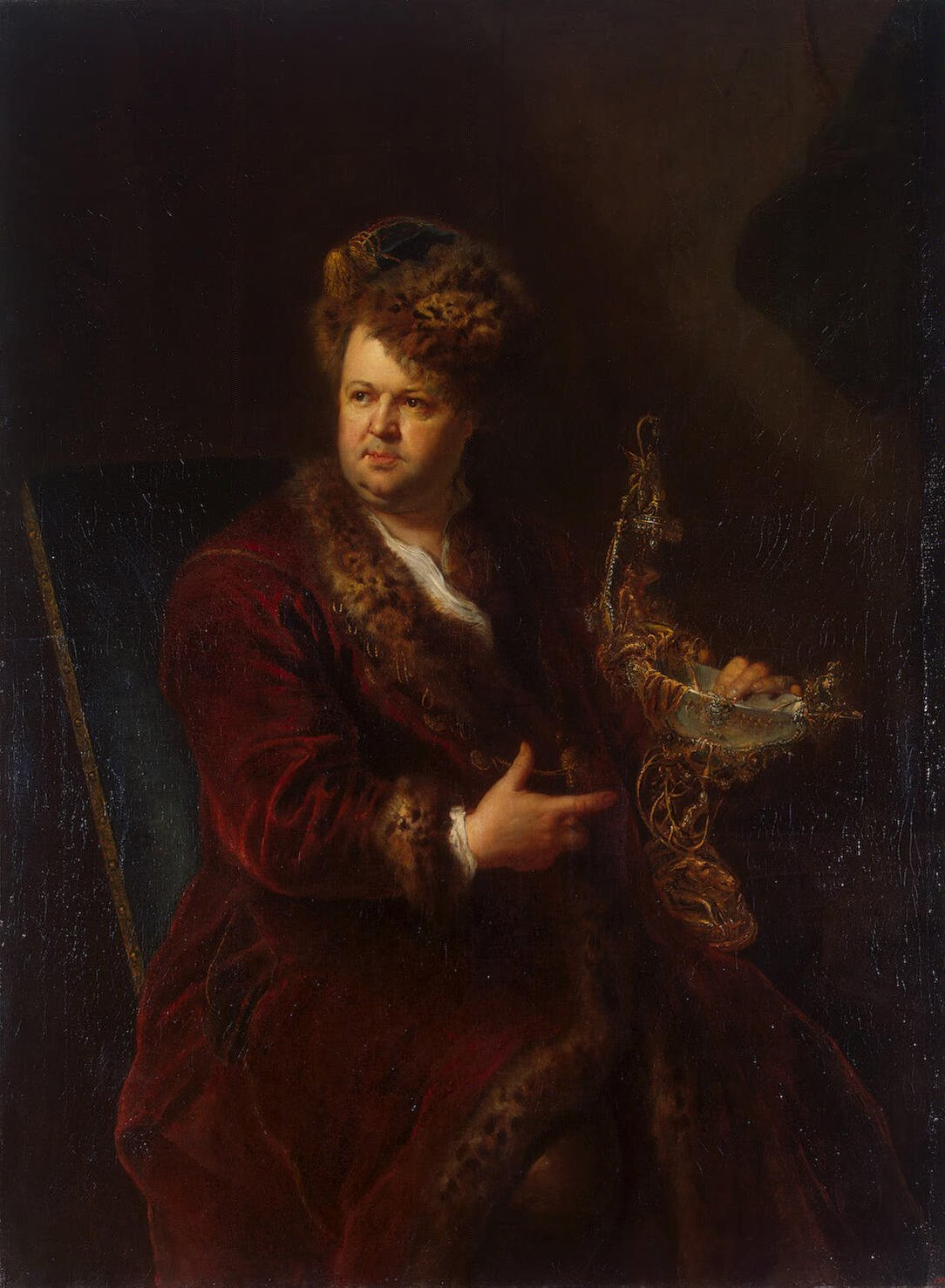
In Dinglinger's portrait by Antoine Pesne, c. 1721, the entrepreneur, swathed in furs, displays his richly-mounted translucent chalcedony Dianabad (Hermitage, St Petersburg).

Johann Melchior Dinglinger (26 December 1664 – 6 March 1731) was one of Europe's greatest goldsmiths, whose major works for the elector of Saxony, Augustus the Strong, survived in the Grünes Gewölbe (the "Green Vaults"), Dresden. Dinglinger was the last goldsmith to work on the grand scale of Benvenuto Cellini and Wenzel Jamnitzer, fewer of whose large-scale works in precious materials have survived, however. His work carries on in a Mannerist tradition into the "Age of Rococo".

== Biography ==
Dinglinger was born in Biberach an der Riß (today in Baden-Württemberg). He served his apprenticeship in Ulm, after which he refined his techniques working as a journeyman in Augsburg, Nuremberg and Vienna, three traditional centers of luxury arts. He went to Dresden in 1692, where he spent the rest of his career in the service of Augustus, by whom he was appointed court jeweller in 1698. In the workshop he established, he was assisted by his younger brothers, the enameller Georg Friedrich Dinglinger (1666–1720) and Georg Christoph Dinglinger (1668–1728), who specialized in cutting and setting jewels. The sculptor Balthasar Permoser collaborated as a modeller in Dinglinger's workshops. Dinglinger's sister Sophie was also an artist.

Dinglinger married five times and had twenty-three children, of whom eleven survived to maturity. The famous house he erected in Dresden was burned in the Seven Years' War. He died in Dresden.

== Works ==
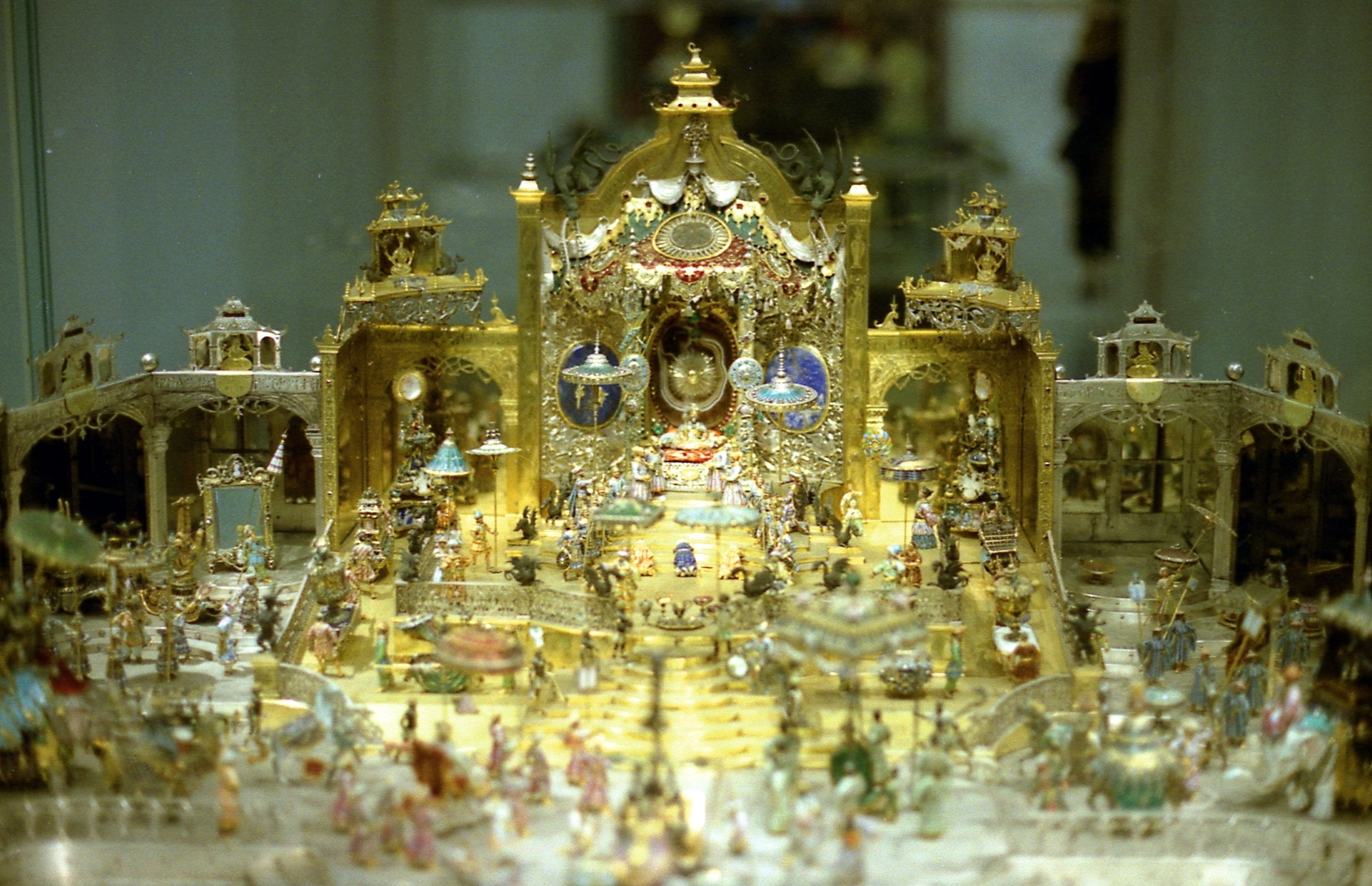
The Mughal imperial palace at Delhi (1701–1708)

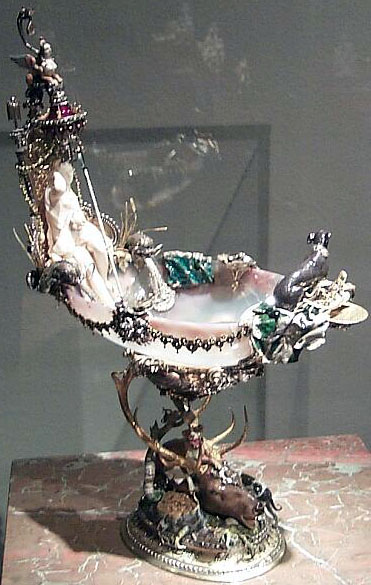
Bath of Diana

Dinglinger's major works, all for Augustus:

- 1697–1701 The Golden Coffee Service, which presents the cups and saucers and sugar bowls on an elaborate pyramidal etagère surmounted by the coffeepot, all in enamelled gold, a kabinettstuck unique in Europe. Augustus took the recently completed ensemble with him to Warsaw at Christmas 1701, to dazzle the nobles of the Polish–Lithuanian Commonwealth of which he was the nominal ruler.
- The Birthday of the Grand Mughal Aurangzeb, now on display in Dresden's Green Vault, with 137 modelled enamelled and jewel-encrusted figures of men and animals, which Dinglinger commenced without a specific commission, and sold to the delighted Elector for a spectacular 55,485 thaler. The invasion of Saxony by Charles XII of Sweden made payments difficult and the greater part of the vast sum was owing until 1713.
- 1704 Dianabad (The "Bath of Diana"), in which a chalcedony bowl in a filigree is supported between the horns of a stag's head.
- 1722 Obeliscus Augustalis
- Altar of Apis, an unusual example, for its generation, of Egyptianizing taste
- before 1722 Pair of agate standing cups celebrating the election of Augustus as King of Poland, mounted in gold, enamel, parcel gilt silver, and semi-precious stones
