= Jeannette Papin =

German artist (1761–1835)

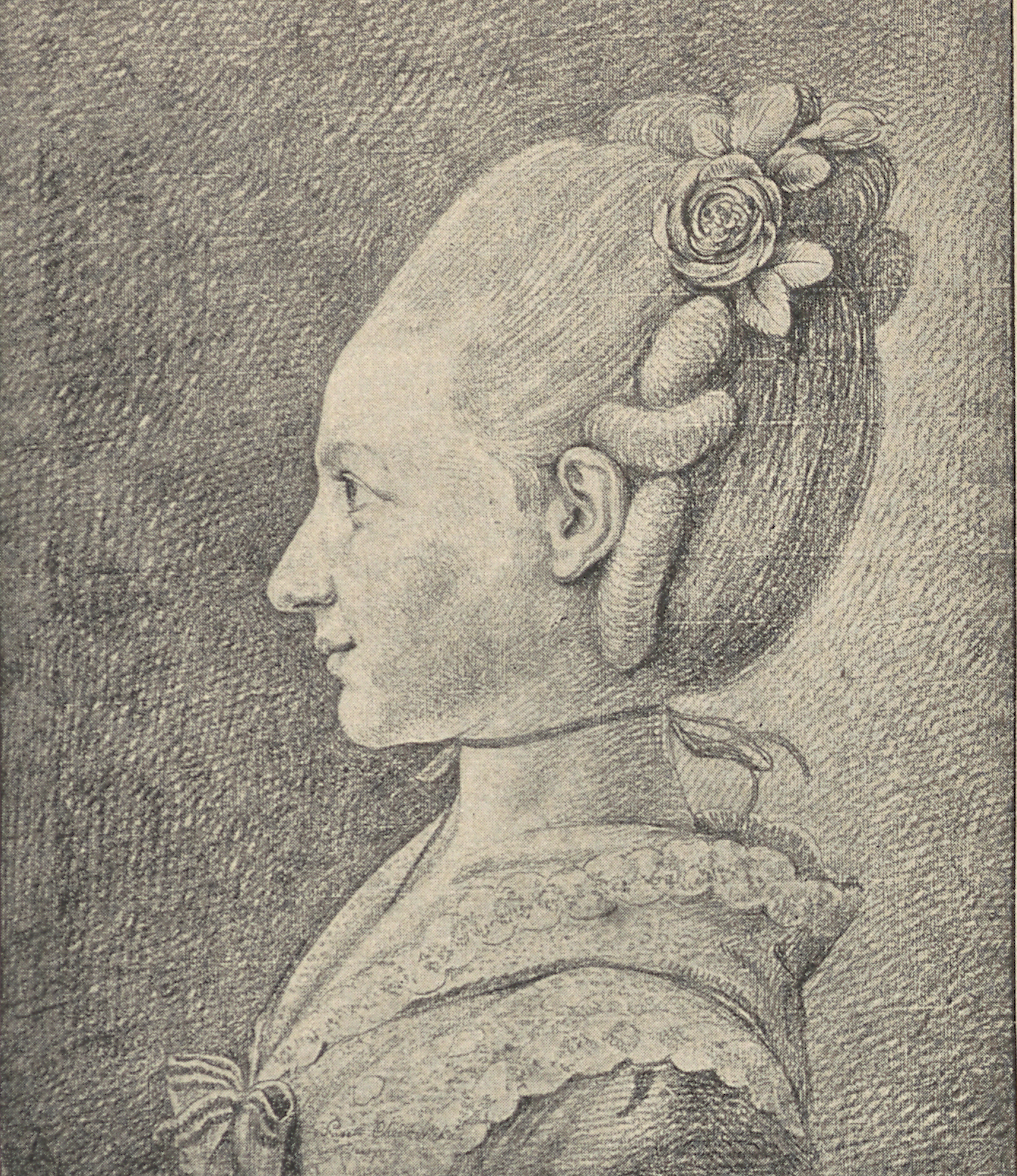
- Portrait of Jeanette Chodowiecka by her father, 1774.
- Born: 1761; Berlin
- Died: 1835 (aged 73–74)
- Occupation: Watercolorist, painter
- Children: Marianne Gretschel, Heinrich Papin
- Parent(s): Daniel Chodowiecki
- Relatives: Suzanne Chodowiecka, Henriette Chodowiecka

Jeannette, sometimes "Nanette", Papin, née Chodowiecka (1761–1835) was a German painter.

Jeannette Chodowiecka was a daughter of Jeanne Barez and her husband Daniel Chodowiecki. Papin was born in Berlin, moving to Frankfurt an der Oder after her marriage to a member of the clergy. From 1788 she sent pastels from there to the Academy of Arts in her hometown. Exhibited under the section for dilettantes, they included genre works and copies after other artists. Her work received favorable critical attention. Her sisters Suzanne and Henriette were painters, as were her daughter Marianne Chodowiecka Papin and son Heinrich Papin.
