= Sophie Dinglinger =

German artist (1736–1791)

- Born: Sophie Friederike; 1736; Dresden, Electorate of Saxony, Holy Roman Empire
- Died: 1791 (aged 54–55)
- Known for: Miniature painting Pastels

Sophie Friederike Dinglinger (1736–1791) was a German painter.

== Life and work ==
Born in Dresden, Dinglinger was the daughter of goldsmith Johann Friedrich Dinglinger, and granddaughter of the better known goldsmith Johann Melchior Dinglinger. She studied with Adam Friedrich Oeser. She invented a method to fix pastel to paper which was used by, among others, Dora Stock; this appears to have allowed the use of deeper colors and a naturalistic treatment of fabric. She produced miniature paintings and pastels during her career. Henriette-Félicité Tassaert lived with Dinglinger during the start of her sojourn in Dresden.
