= Jean-Pierre-Antoine Tassaert =

Flemish sculptor (1727-1788)

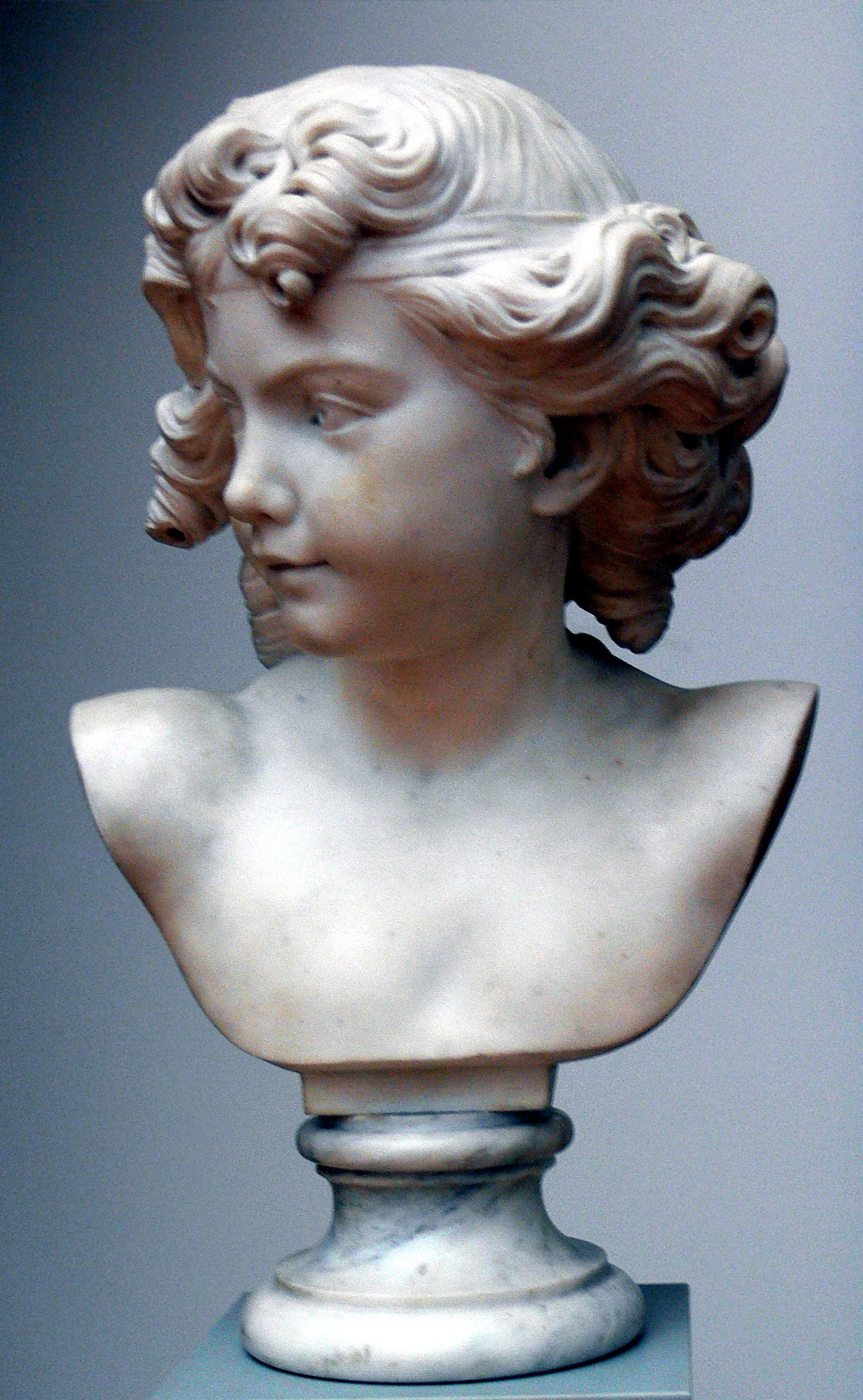
- Head of a Cupid
- Born: 1727, Antwerp; Antwerp, Habsburg Netherlands
- Died: 21 January 1788; Berlin, Kingdom of Prussia
- Known for: Sculpture
- Movement: Neoclassicism
- Relatives: Philippe Joseph Tassaert brother
- Family: Tassaert family

Jean-Pierre-Antoine Tassaert or Jean Pierre Antoine Tassaert (1727, Antwerp – 21 January 1788, Berlin) was a sculptor of Flemish extraction who, after a successful career in France, became a leading portrait sculptor in Berlin.

== Life ==
=== Training ===
Tassaert was born in Antwerp where he was baptised on 19 August 1727. He trained in Antwerp and London. From 1744 he resided in Paris where he studied in the atelier of René-Michel Slodtz, a member of a dynasty of designer-sculptors of Flemish extraction working for the royal court.

=== Career in Paris ===
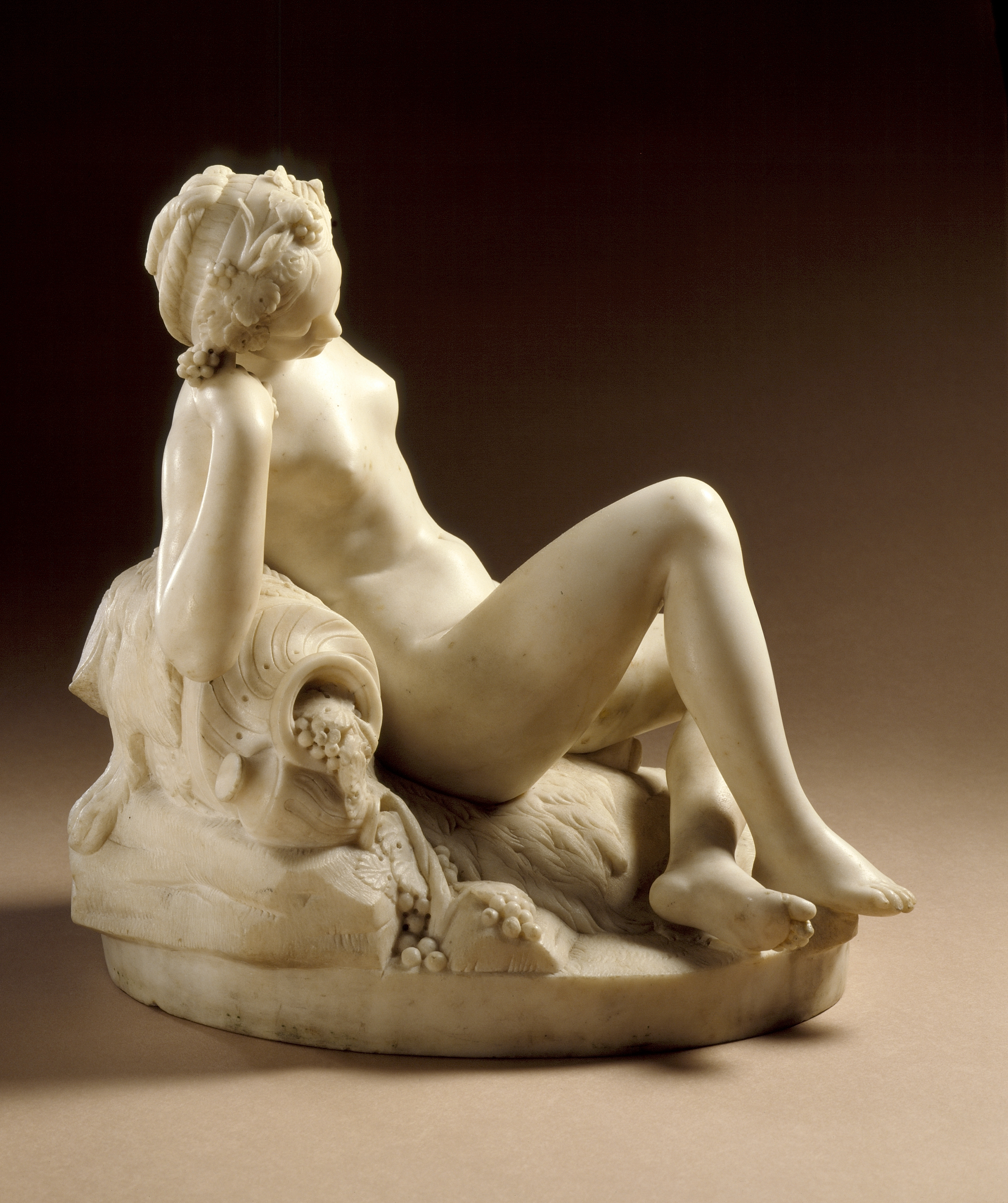
Reclining Bacchante

In 1769 Tassaert was approved (agréé) at the French Académie Royale (which constitutes the first level of admission to the Académie) but he was never received (reçu) as a full member academician. After Slodtz's death in 1764, he emerged as a sculptor in his own right. He exhibited frequently at the Salon, mainly showing small mythological and allegorical figures and groups. His work was well liked by the aristocracy and the Marquise de Pompadour was one of his patrons. He received many commissions and worked at least since the mid-fifties at the Pavilion du Roi of the art-loving general tax collector Etienne-Michel Bouret. Other influential patrons included the "Contrôleur général des finances" Abbé Joseph Marie Terray (1715-1778) and the Russian diplomat and later President of the Imperial Academy of Arts, Baron Alexander Sergeyevich Stroganov (1733-1811). He finally became court sculptor of the Count of the Provence (the later King Louis XVIII), who made him his appointed sculptor (sculpteur attitré) in 1773.

=== Career in Berlin ===
Tassaert had married the miniature painter Marie-Edmée Moreau (1736–91) in Paris in 1758. This marriage produced 8 children. Because of the financial strain of raising a large family, Tassaert wished to find a steady employment. In June 1775, after a career of about 30 years in Paris, Tassaert moved with his family to Berlin. Here he became the third director of the royal sculpture workshop, also called the 'French studio', because the two previous directors had been the Frenchmen François Gaspard Adam (1710-1761) and Sigisbert-François Michel (1728-1811). The contract for his appointment had been signed by the Prussian king Frederick the Great. The position of first royal sculptor had been vacant for several years when Tassaert took on the post. The appointment of Tassaert had been brokered by the French encyclopaedist Jean le Rond d'Alembert (1717-1783). Tassaert had also sent the king some of his works in order to support his application for the position. One of the sculptures he sent was a statute of a Bathing Venus. Story has it that the Prussian king liked the sculpture so much that he did not dare to take it out of its box out of fear it might be damaged. The position at the court guaranteed Tassaert, in addition to fees for his work, a steady income, paid assistants, a free studio and a house built from the royal purse.

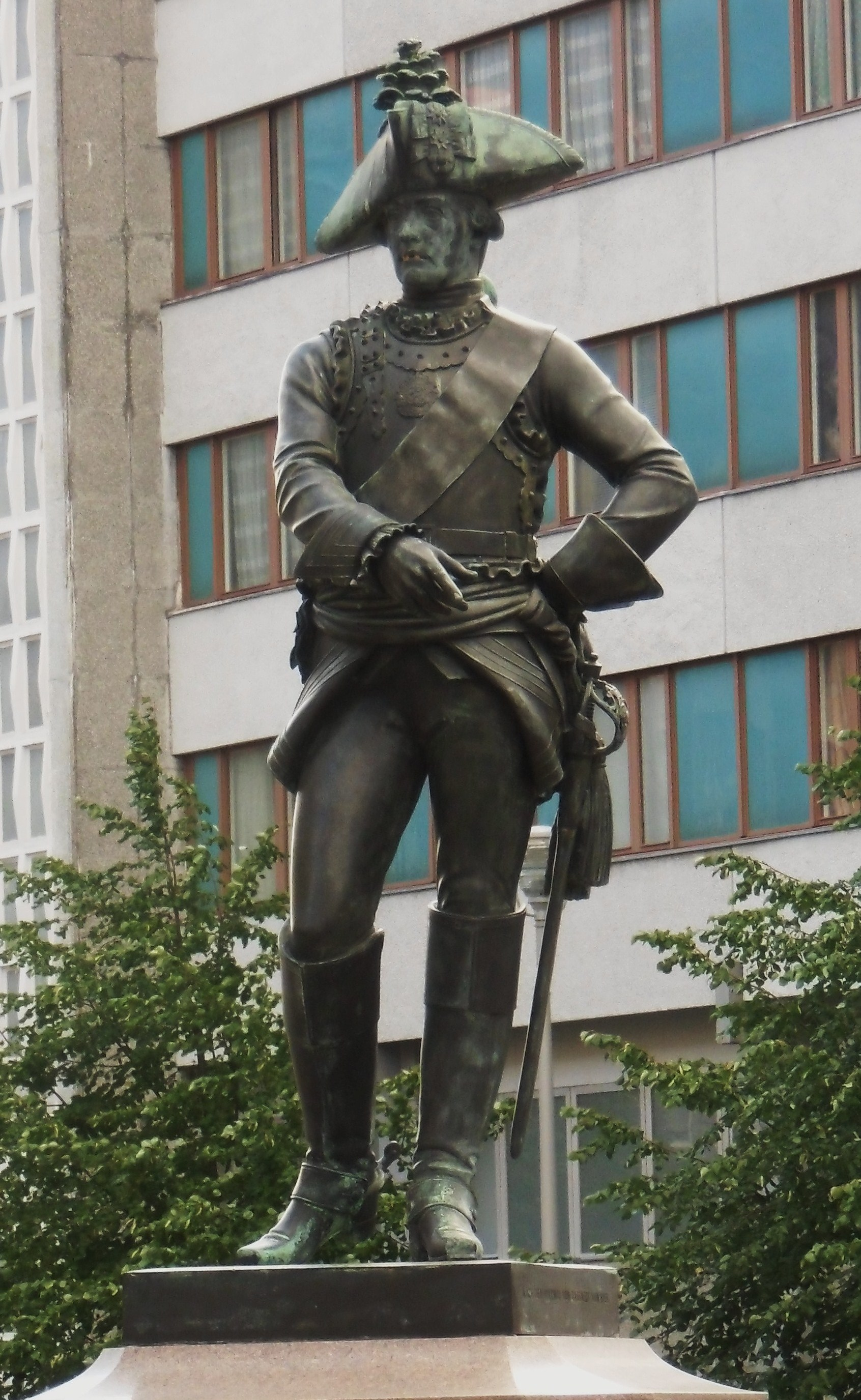
Statue of Friedrich Wilhelm von Seydlitz in Berlin

The house and studio promised by the king were completed in 1779. Here Tassaert also set up a kind of master-studio, where he trained young sculptors. The most famous of his pupils was Gottfried Schadow who would be his successor as court sculptor.

He commenced a period of intense artistic activity in Berlin. His first major works were four marble statues of Bacchus, a faun and two Bacchantes made for the great hall of the new rooms in the palace of Sanssouci. In addition to many smaller works for the royal palaces, Tassaert was commissioned by the king to make statues of General von Seydlitz and Field Marshal von Keith for the Wilhelmplatz in Berlin (the statues were replaced in 1857 with bronze copies made by August Kiss, the originals can be seen at the Bode Museum). His portrayal of General von Seydlitz in contemporary regimental uniform rather than in the usual Roman drapery was controversial and ignited a debate over the dress of public statues which lasted into the 1830s.

Tassaert also produced in this period a series of penetrating portraits such as that of Moses Mendelssohn (1785).

The artistic activity in Berlin gradually subsided in the final years of Frederick the Great. Upon his death in 1786, his nephew the King Frederick William II revived the support for the arts. In order to promote a more artistic and uniform design even in the architectural ornamental forms, Tassaert was given the task to supervise all "figure sculptors and decorators" working on the royal buildings. From this period date a number of decorative works which have been preserved in the royal palaces. The last work of the artist for the king was the design for a tomb of the Count von der Mark, which was executed in a different manner by his pupil Johann Gottfried Schadow. He died in his home on 21 January 1788.

=== Family ===
He was the nephew of Jean-Pierre Tassaert (1651-1725), and the grandson of Pierre Tassaert (master of the painters' Guild of Saint Luke 1635- ca 1692/93) both painters of Antwerp. Tassaert was the teacher of his son Jean-Joseph-François Tassaert and daughter Henriette-Félicité Tassaert. They were accomplished portraitists, Jean-Joseph-François working as an engraver in Paris and Henriette-Felicité as a pastel specialist in Germany. Jean-Joseph-François' son Octave Tassaert was successful in Paris with his genre paintings depicting the miserable living conditions of the citizens of 19th-century Paris.

== Selected works ==
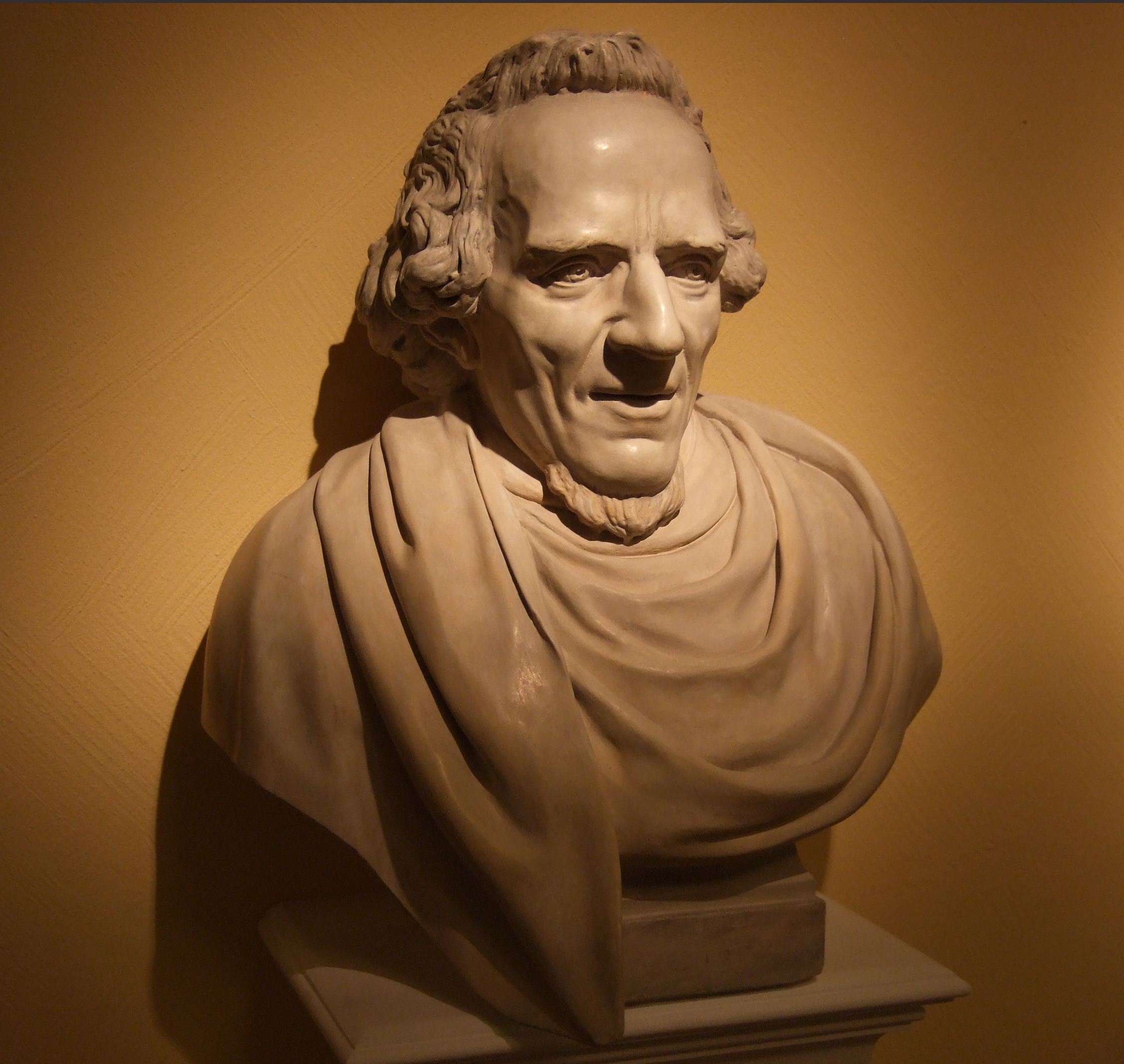
Bust of Moses Mendelssohn

- Pyrrha, or Population, white marble ca. 1773–74 (plaster model exhibited at the Salon of 1773). Commissioned by the Abbé Terray for the sculpture gallery in his Paris residence, rue Notre-Dame-des-Champs, as a pair to Augustin Pajou's Mercury, or Commerce. Michael Levey suggests that the commission most likely dates from Terray's brief tour as Director of the Bâtiments du Roi.
- Putti representing Painting and Sculpture, white marble ca 1774–78 also commissioned by Terray as one of four groups by various sculptors
- Cupid Preparing to Shoot his Arrow (Malmaison).
- Portrait bust of Christian Fürchtegott Gellert (1715 - 1769). (Louvre Museum)
- Catherine the Great as Minerva Protectress of the Arts (Hermitage Museum).
- (attributed) Seated Venus Filling a Quiver with Roses, white marble (Musée Cognac-Jay, Paris).
