= Suzanne Chodowiecka =

German artist (1763/64–1819)

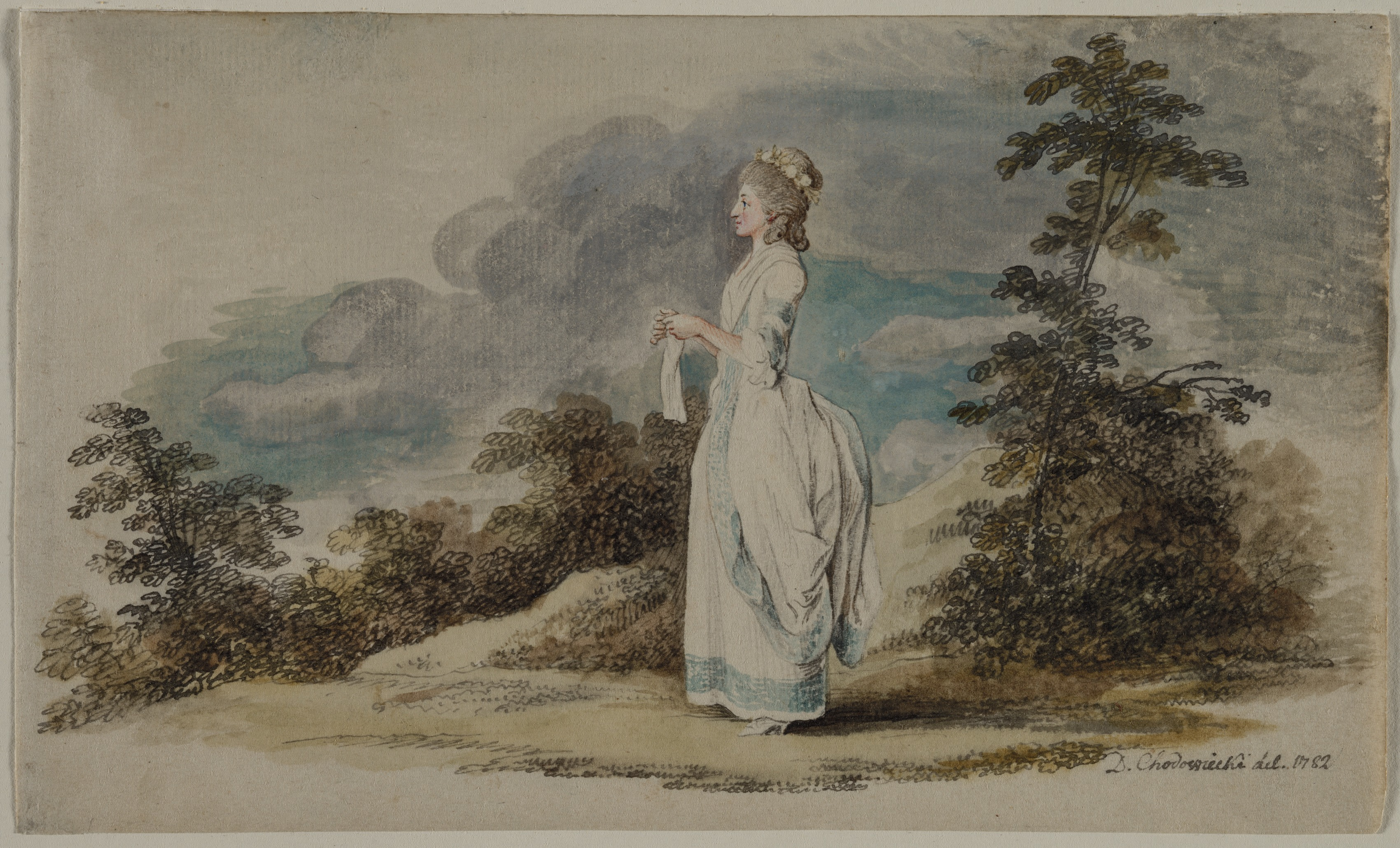
- Chodowiecka by Daniel Chodowiecki, 1782
- Born: 26 July 1763; Berlin, Prussia
- Died: 27 March 1819 (aged 55)
- Spouse: Jean Henry (m. 1785)
- Children: 3
- Parent(s): Daniel Chodowiecki; Jeanne Barez

Suzanne Chodowiecka (26 July 1763 – 27 March 1819) was a German painter. Her first name is sometimes spelled Susanne; also known as Suzette or Susette, she was also known as Mme. Henry after her marriage.

Born in Berlin, Chodowiecka was the middle daughter of painter Daniel Chodowiecki; her sisters Jeannette and Henriette also became artists. A pupil of Anton Graff, she became a member of the Prussian Academy of Arts in 1789 and exhibited work, including copies of old master paintings in the royal collection, on numerous occasions. Active as a genre painter and portraitist, among her subjects were members of the Prussian royal family. She was married to a member of the clergy, as was her sister Jeannette.
