= Octave Tassaert =

French painter and engraver

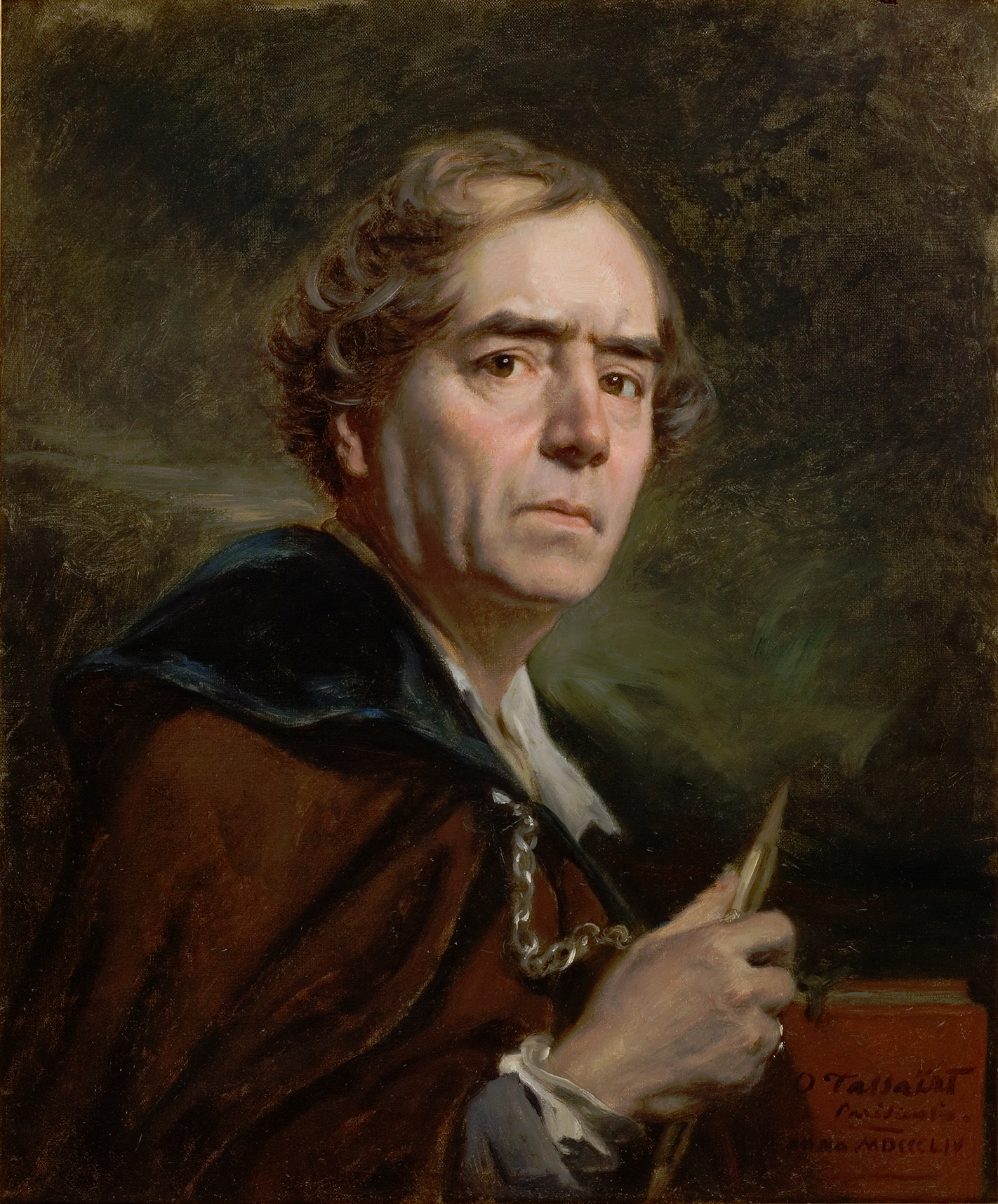
- Self-portrait holding a brush and palette, Musée Fabre, Montpellier
- Born: 26 July 1800; Paris, Kingdom of France
- Died: 24 April 1874 (aged 73); Paris, Kingdom of France
- Known for: Painting
- Father: Jean-Joseph-François Tassaert
- Family: Tassaert family

Nicolas François Octave Tassaert (Paris, 26 July 1800 – Paris, 24 April 1874) was a French painter of portraits and genre, religious, historical and allegorical paintings, as well as a lithographer and engraver. His genre pieces evoked the miserable life of the downtrodden in Paris and included a number of scenes of suicide. He further created sensuous images of women and erotic scenes. He was later in life active as a writer and poet. He was the grandson of the Flemish sculptor Jean-Pierre-Antoine Tassaert.

== Life ==
Octave Tassaert came from an originally Flemish family of artists who worked mainly in Antwerp, Paris and Prussia. He was the son of the engraver Jean-Joseph-François Tassaert (1765-c. 1835) and grandson of the Flemish sculptor Jean-Pierre-Antoine Tassaert, who had worked mainly in Paris and Berlin. Octave's first artistic training came from his father and then his older brother Paul (?-1855), both of whom were print artists and art dealers. Together with his brother Paul, he first produced wood engravings.

In 1816 he worked for some time with the engraver Alexis-François Girard (1787–1870). In the meantime he tried his hand at painting. On 1 February 1817, he was admitted to the École des Beaux-Arts in Paris. Guillaume Guillon Lethière was one of his professors. From 1823 to 1824 he worked purposefully toward the Prix de Rome, but was unable to win it. This shook his self-confidence so badly that for the next twenty years he returned to wood engraving and lithography as a commercial artist. It was mainly during this period that he produced his numerous erotic lithographs for collectors. He also illustrated books for Victor Hugo, Alexandre Dumas the Elder, François-René de Chateaubriand and others.

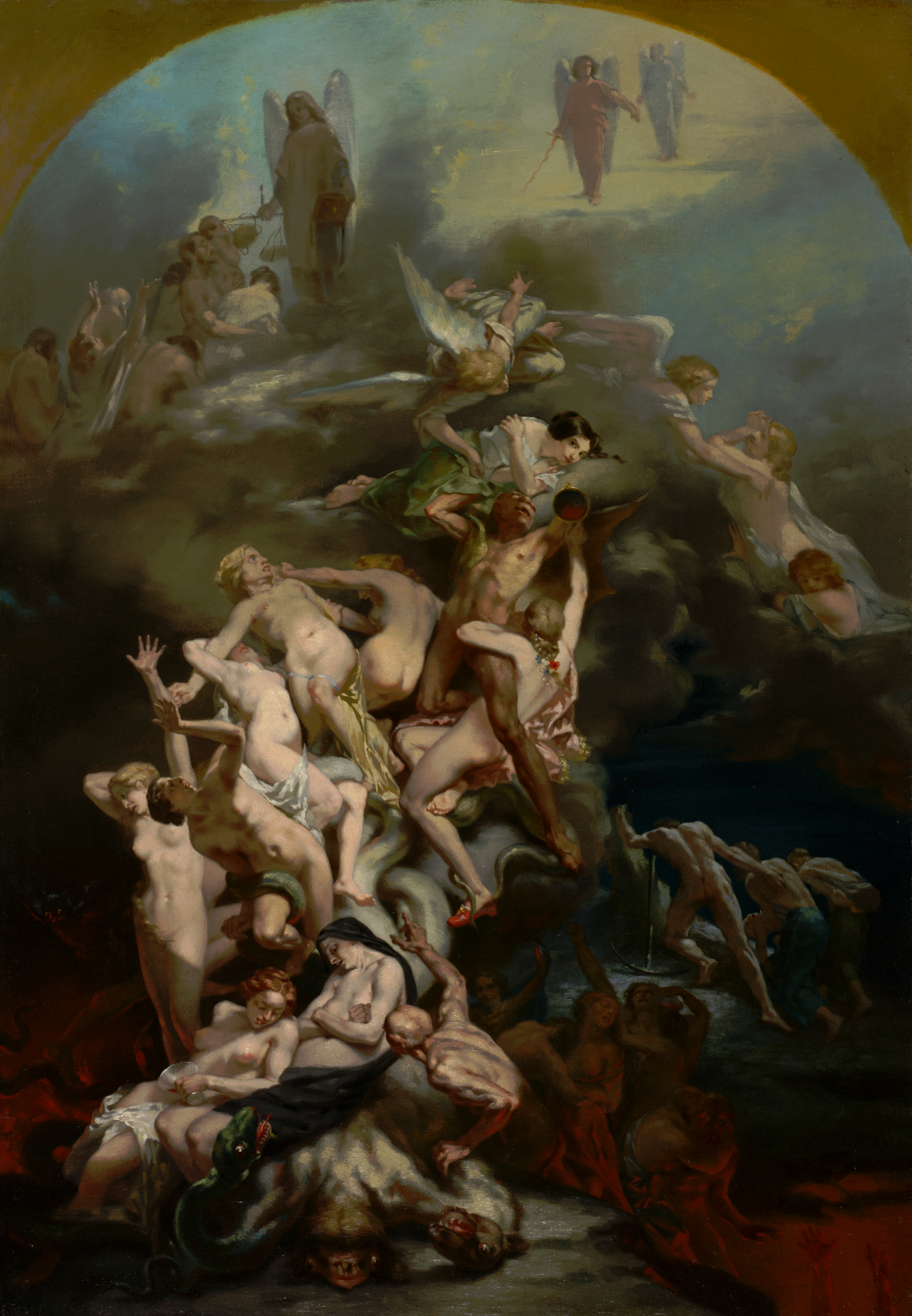
Heaven and Hell, c. 1850, Cleveland Museum of Art

He began painting again and exhibited at the Paris salons. His first success was the purchase of his painting The Death of Correggio by the Duke of Orleans, the French king's son (Salon of 1834, now in the Hermitage, Saint Petersburg). Tassaert's historical, religious, allegorical, and especially genre scenes, often melodramatic in character, earned him nicknames such as the "Prud'hon of the Poor Man" or the "Correggio of the Attic." In the 1850s he had some success with paintings depicting the lives of the disadvantaged: unhappy families, dying mothers, sick or abandoned children and wives, and the like. An example of this is his work An Unfortunate Family or Suicide, shown at the Salon of 1850. It shows a sensitive depiction of the double suicide of a mother and daughter by burning charcoal in their attic. He subsequently produced other works depicting the bleak lives of working women in Paris. With his depictions of social injustice, he sought to strike an emotional chord with the viewer. Some of his contemporaries found this work rather sentimental. Although his contribution to the Salon of 1855 during the exposition universelle was well received by critics, Tassaert increasingly withdrew from the art world which he despised and did not exhibit again after the Salon of 1857.

Among Tassaert's contemporary admirers were Eugène Delacroix and the Barbizon artists Charles Jacque, Narcisso Virgilio Díaz de la Peña, Constant Troyon, and Léon Bonnat. Alfred Bruyas and Alexandre Dumas, fils appreciated his art and also bought his works. Dumas' art collection included at least fifty works by Tassaert. He became more and more addicted to alcohol. He sold his stock of paintings to the art dealer Père Martin in 1863 and stopped painting. He now tried his hand as a poet, without success. Hardly any manuscripts have survived, leading to the assumption that he destroyed his manuscripts himself. Excessive alcohol consumption also clouded his eyesight. He was treated at Montpellier in 1865, during which time he stayed with Bruyas. He became impoverished and committed suicide in 1874 in the same way as the women in his painting "Suicide," by burning charcoal.

== Selected works ==
- The Death of Correggio, 1834 Paris Salon - Hermitage Museum, Saint Petersburg, Russia - purchased by Ferdinand Philippe, Duke of Orléans, and thus Octave's first success
- An Unfortunate Family or Suicide, 1849 - Musée d'Orsay
- The Deserted Woman, 1852 - National Gallery of Australia, Canberra
- Heaven and Hell, 1850 - Cleveland Museum of Art
- The Bourgeois' Kitchen, 1854 - Cleveland Museum of Art

== Gallery ==
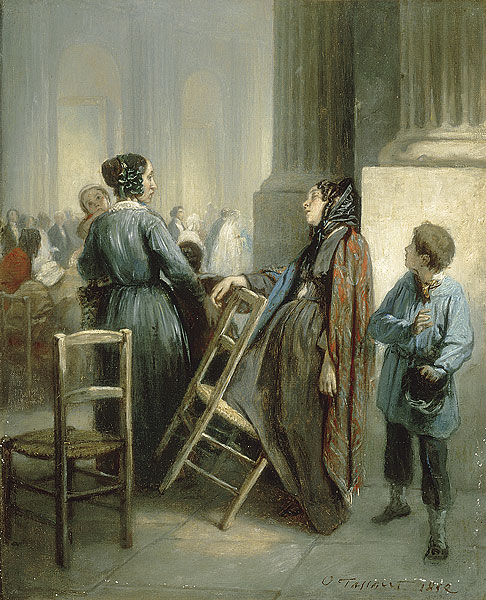
The Deserted Woman, 1852, Musée Fabre

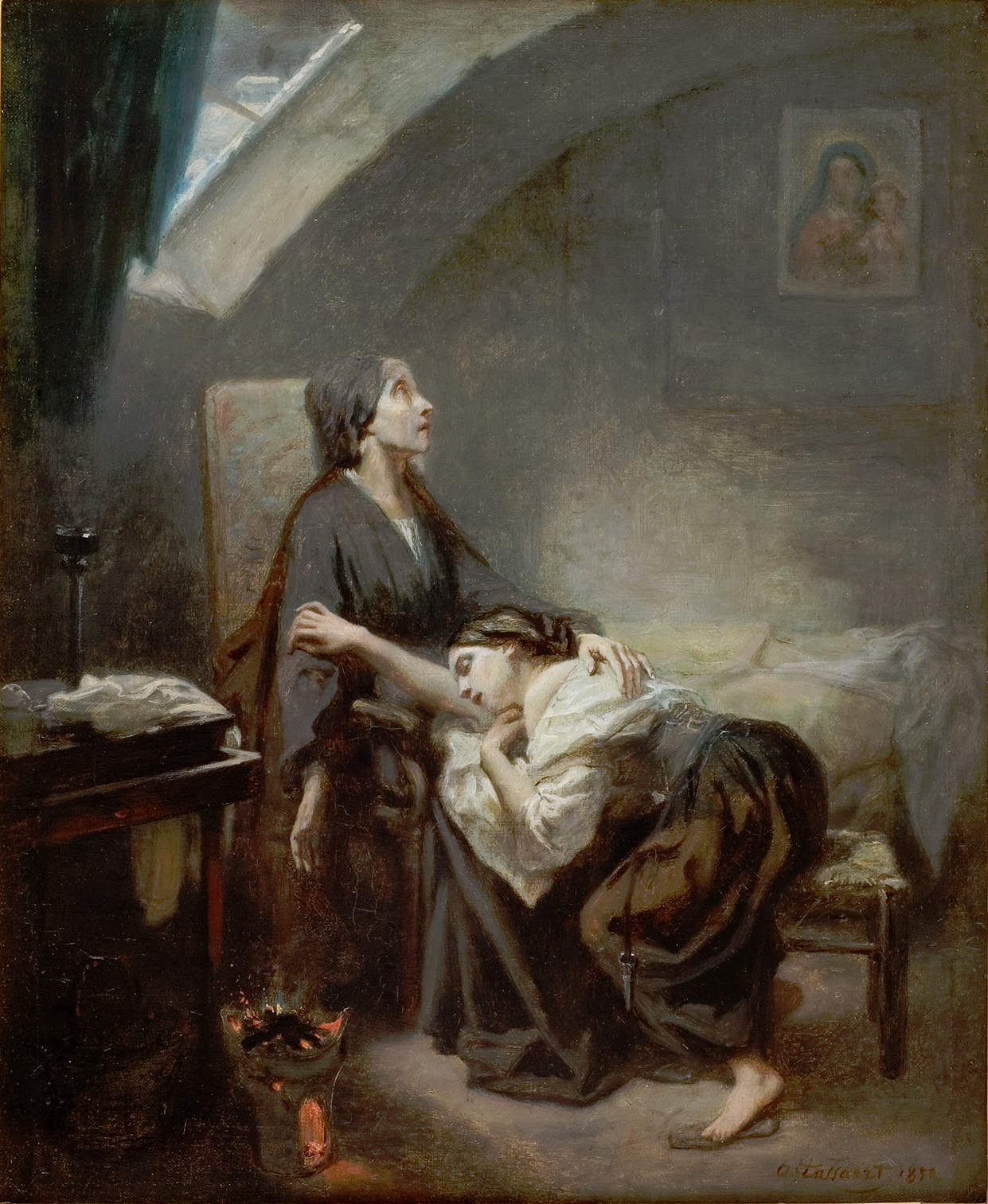
An Unfortunate Family aka Suicide 1852, Musée Fabre

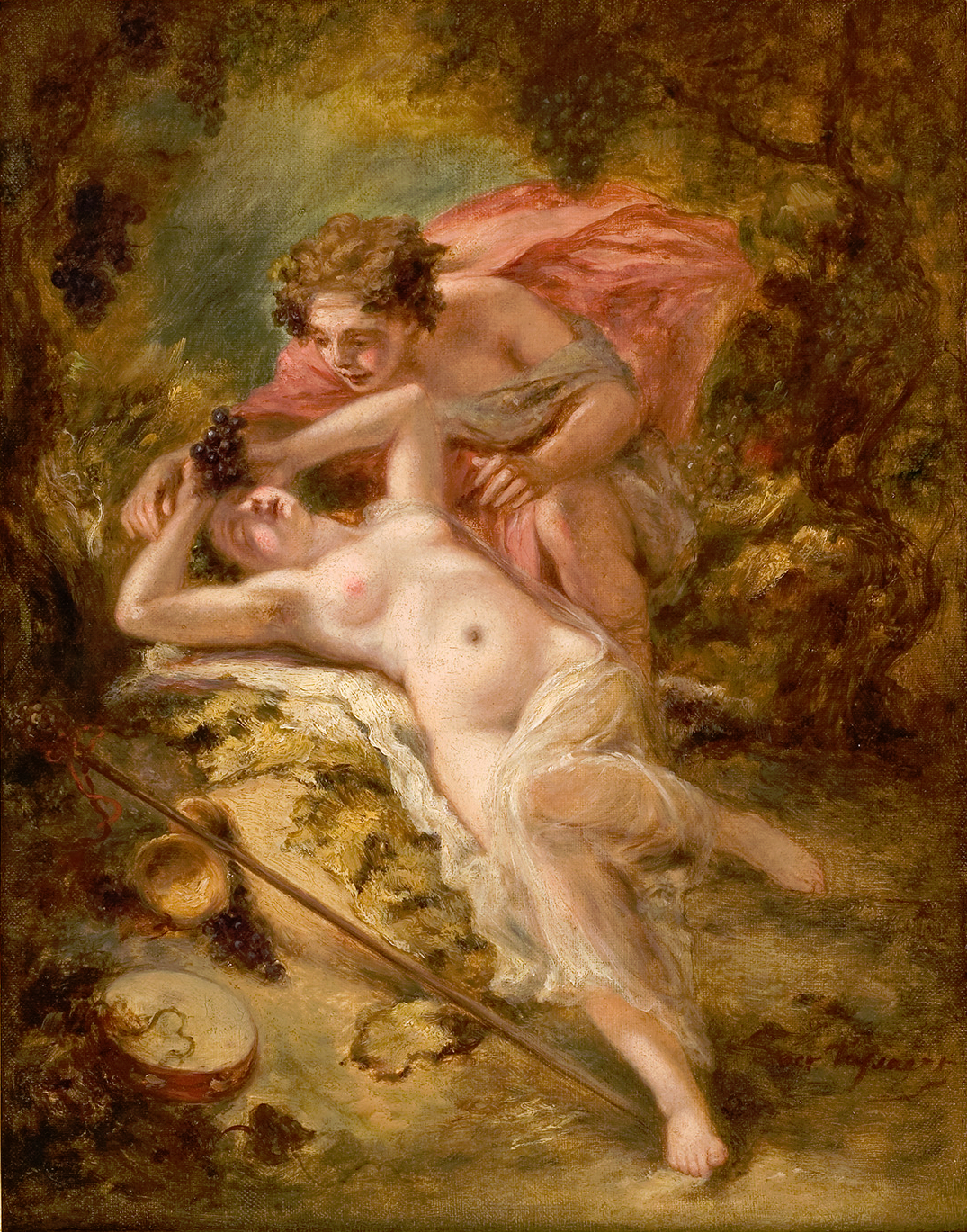
Bacchus and Erigone, Musée Fabre

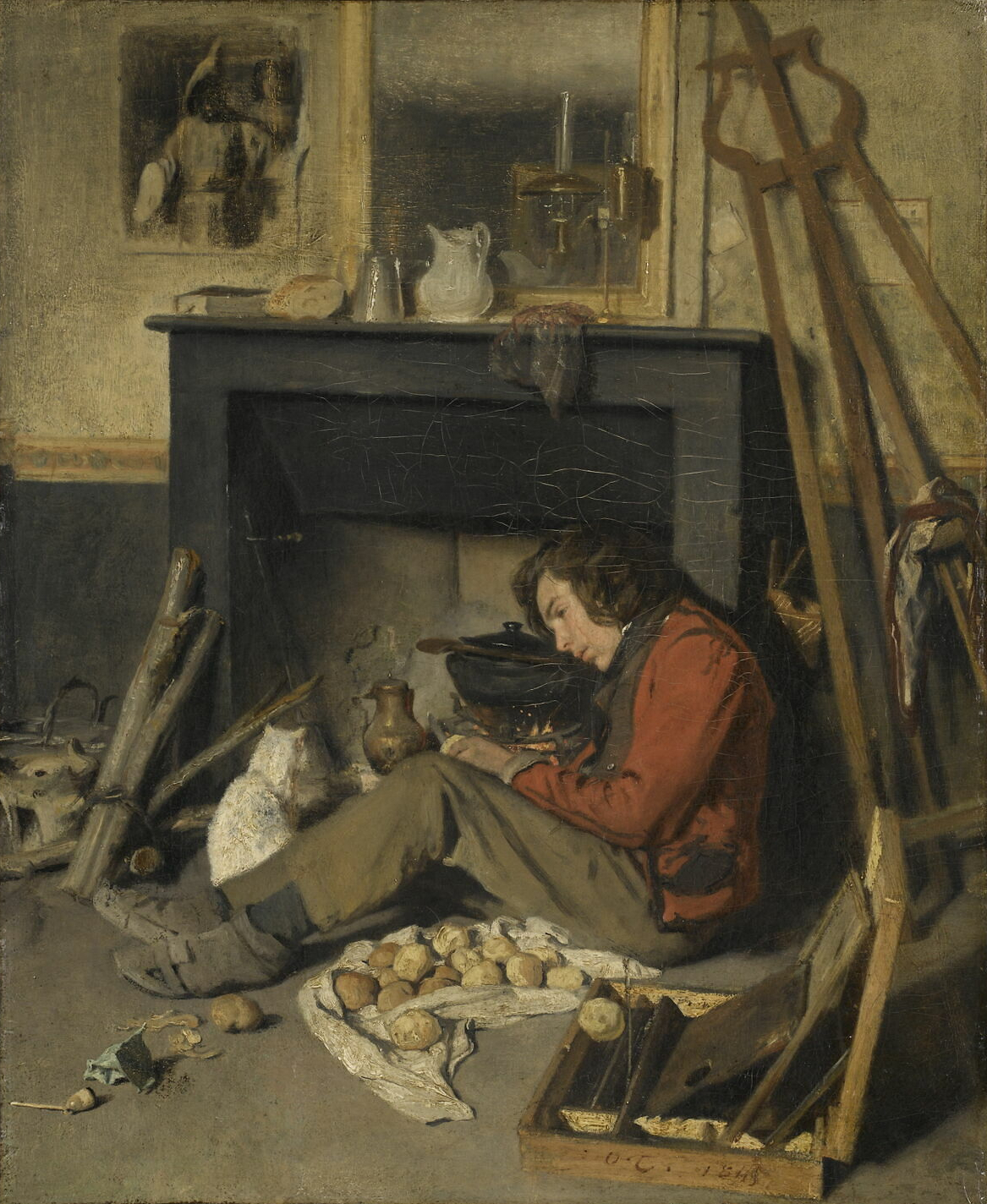
The artist's studio, 1845, Louvre

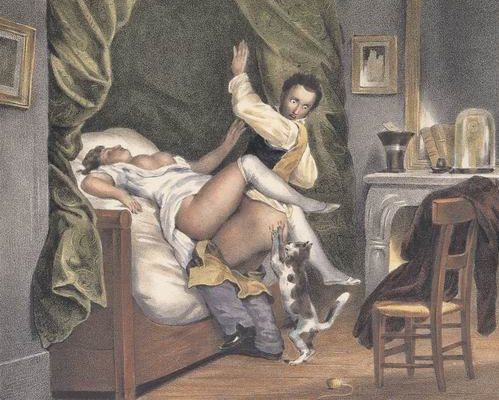
The Jealous Cat, lithograph, c. 1860
