= Charles-André Merda =

French soldier

Arrest of Robespierre and his followers. At the centre of the image, gendarme Merda fires at Robespierre. (Colour engraving by Jean-Joseph-François Tassaert after the painting by Fulchran-Jean Harriet - Musée Carnavalet).

Général de brigade Charles André Merda, baron Meda (French pronunciation: [ʃaʁl ɑ̃dʁe mɛʁda]; 10 January 1770 – 8 September 1812) was a French soldier. A National Guardsman in the Parisian National Guard from September 1789, then a gendarme from 1794, he participated in the arrest of Maximilien de Robespierre on the night of 9/10 Thermidor Year II (27 July 1794) and claimed to have fired the pistol shot which broke Robespierre's jaw and hit Couthon's helper in his leg.

Under the First French Empire he was made a baron and changed his surname to Meda (sometimes spelt Méda). Whilst fighting as colonel of the 1er régiment de chasseurs à cheval (France), he was mortally wounded by a musket ball at the battle of Borodino and was made a general on his deathbed. He was survived by his wife and two sons.
