= Fulchran-Jean Harriet =

French painter (1776–1805)

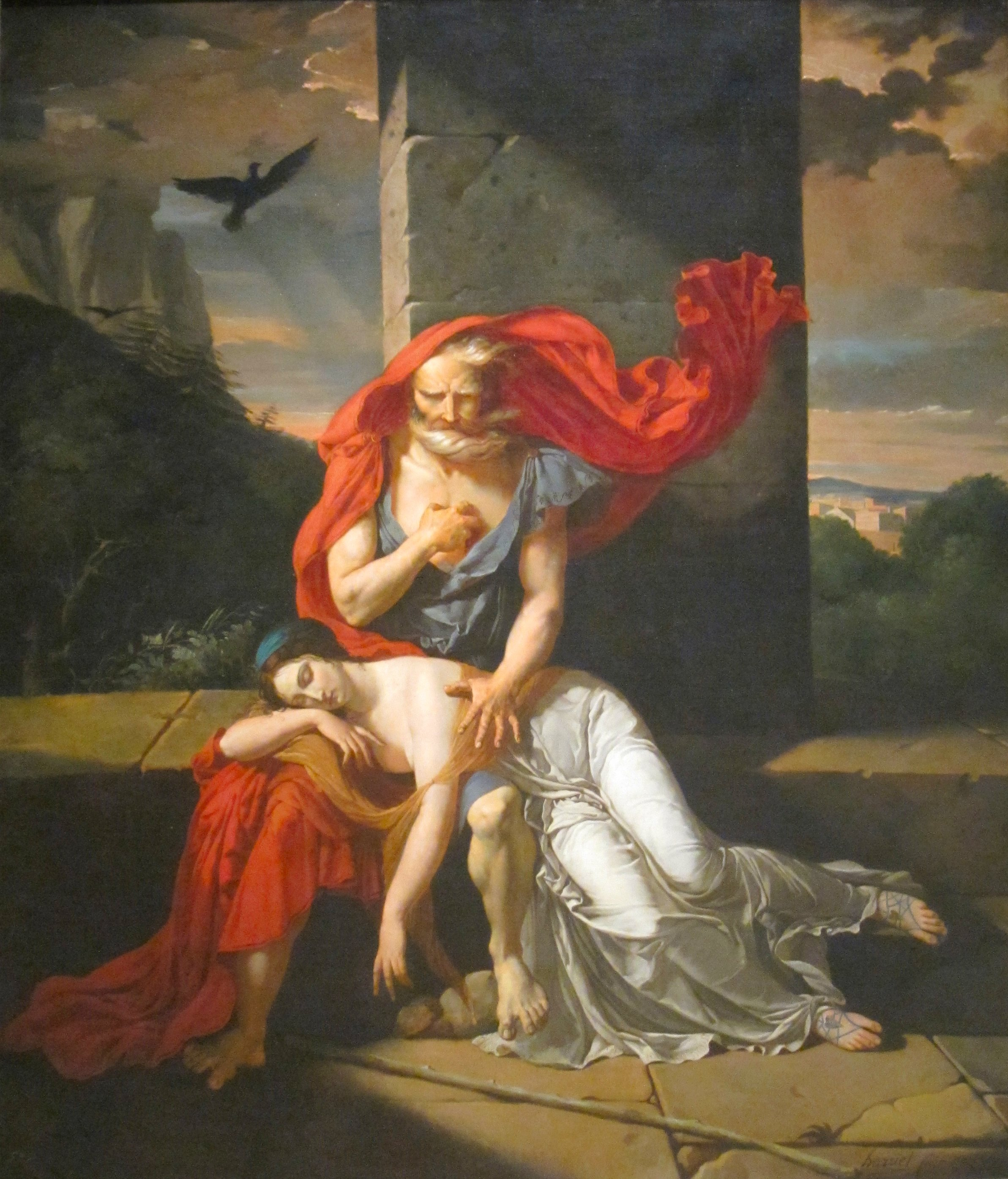
Oedipus at Colonus, 1798 (Cleveland, Museum of Art)

Fulchran-Jean Harriet (1776 – 9 September 1805) was a French academic painter.

== Life ==
He was born in Paris. A student of David, he won the Prix de Rome in 1793 with Brutus, killed in battle, is brought back to Rome, and in 1798 with a painting on the theme of Battle of the Horatii and the Curiatii.

He exhibited at the Paris Salon from 1796 to 1802. At the Salon of 1806 a posthumous exhibition of his work was organised, though an earlier one had been improvised at the French Academy in Rome just after his death there in 1805, centred on his major uncompleted canvas Horatius Cocles defending the pons Sublicius.

== Salon-exhibited paintings ==
- 1796
  - n° 200, Ariadne abandoned by Theseus on the isle of Naxos.
  - n° 201, Two subjects drawn from the story of Hero and Leander.
  - drawings: n° 202 Oedipus at Colonus and Sappho and Anacreon.
- 1799
  - n° 155, Portrait of citizeness G.. in the bath.
- 1800
  - n° 181, Dying Virgil.
  - n° 182, The Death of Raphael, allegorical drawing
  - Portrait of a woman.
- 1802
  - Portrait of an author.
  - Portrait of a child.
- 1806
  - n° 244 Hylas abducted by Nymphs, mentioned as belonging to his widow, an artist in her own right
  - n° 245 Hero and Leander, drawing, mentioned as belonging to his widow

== Works ==
=== Surviving ===
Arrestat of the robespierristes. At the centre of the image, gendarme Merda fires at Robespierre. (Colour engraving by Jean-Joseph-François Tassaert after the painting by Harriet, Musée Carnavalet).

- Portrait of a young boy holding a hoop, Orléans, Musée des Beaux-Arts, oil on canvas, 51 by 38 cm, signed and dated on the hoop Harriet fecit 1797, bought by the city in 1901.
- Battle of the Horatii and the Curiatii, Paris, École nationale supérieure des Beaux-Arts, oil on canvas, 113 par 145, Prix de Rome for painting in 1798, acquired 27 December 1884.
- Head of a young man , possibly a self-portrait, Paris, Musée du Louvre, crayon and stump, 0.40 by 0.32 cm, annotated in the lower right hand corner : Hariette, Élève de David, mort à Rome, at the base 1795, formerly in the collection of the painter Pierre-Maximilien Delafontaine, another student of David, bought in 1999 from the galerie de Bayser, Paris; bibliography: François Viatte, Revue du Louvre, 1999, n° 4, page 93, n° 12
- Marat dying, Versailles, Musée Lambinet, oil on canvas.
- Oedipus at Colonus, 1798, (Cleveland, Museum of Art)

=== Known in engravings ===
- The Night of 9/10 thermidor year II, or The Arrest of Robespierre, Paris, Musée Carnavalet, colour engraving by Jean-Joseph-François Tassaert after Harriet, showing the gendarme Charles-André Merda firing the shot which broke Robespierre's jaw
- Brutus, dead in battle, is brought back to Rome, 1793

== Public sales ==
- Cephalus and Procris, oil on canvas, 96 by 182, Sotheby's New York City, 28 February 1990, lot 3, valued at 15,400 $.

== Bibliography ==
- Millin, Magasin encyclopédique, Tome VI, 1805, page 375. (Cited by Bellier de la Chavignerie).
- Udolpho van de Sandt, «Fulchran-Jean Harriet», Revue de l'Art, n° 159/2008-1, p. 21-43.
