= Christoph Friedrich Nicolai =

German writer (1733–1811)

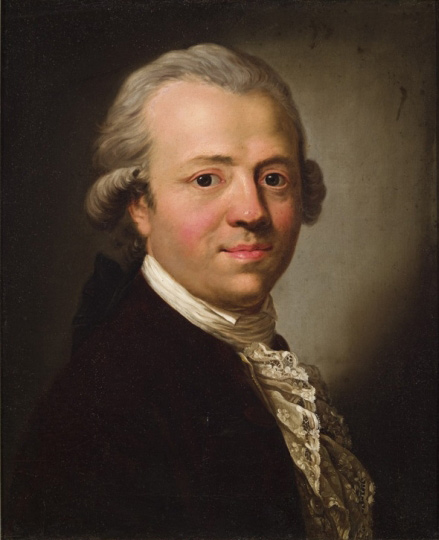
Christoph Friedrich Nicolai, by Ferdinand Collmann

Christoph Friedrich Nicolai (18 March 1733 – 11 January 1811) was a German writer, bookseller, critic, and regional historian, who authored satirical novels and travelogues.

== Life ==
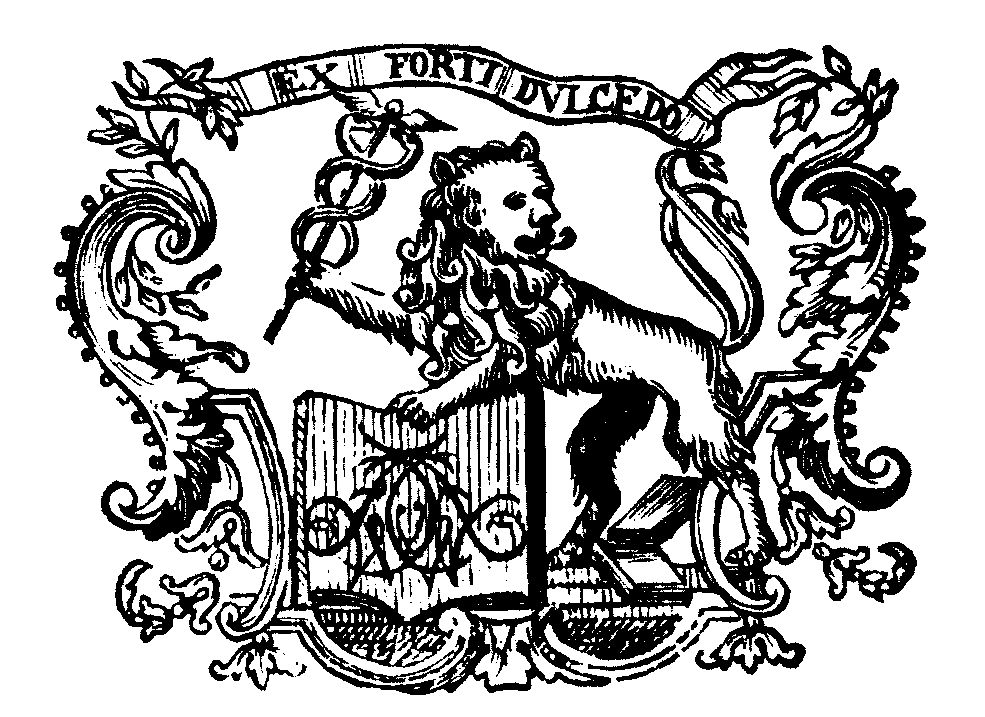
Nicolai's mark (from BEIC)

Nicolai was born in Berlin, where his father, Christoph Gottlieb Nicolai (died 1752), was the founder of the bookseller Nicolaische Buchhandlung. He received a good education, and in 1749 went to Frankfurt (Oder) to learn his father's business, finding time also to become acquainted with English literature.

In 1752 Nicolai returned to Berlin, and began to take part in literary controversy by defending John Milton against the attacks of JC Gottsched. His Briefe über den jetzigen Zustand der schönen Wissenschaften in Deutschland, published anonymously in 1755 and reprinted by G Ellinger in 1894, were directed against both Gottsched and Gottsched's Swiss opponents, Johann Jakob Bodmer and Johann Jakob Breitinger; his enthusiasm for English literature won for him the friendship of Gotthold Ephraim Lessing and Moses Mendelssohn. In association with Mendelssohn he established in 1757 the Bibliothek der schönen Wissenschaften, a periodical which he conducted until 1760. Together with Lessing and Mendelssohn, Nicolai edited the famous book review journal Briefe, die neueste Literatur betreffend between 1759 and 1765; and from 1765 to 1792 he edited another book review journal Allgemeine deutsche Bibliothek. This latter periodical served as the organ of the so-called popular philosophers, who warred against authority in religion and against what they conceived to be extravagance in literature.

His romances are largely forgotten, although Das Leben und die Meinungen des Herrn Magister Sebaldus Nothanker (1773–1776), and his satire on Goethe's Werther, Freuden des jungen Werthers (1775), had a certain reputation in their day. According to the Encyclopædia Britannica Eleventh Edition, his Anekdoten von König Friedrich II. von Preussen (1788–92), an account of events in the court of Frederick II the Great, has some historical value. Between 1788 and 1796, Nicolai published in twelve volumes a Beschreibung einer Reise durch Deutschland und die Schweiz, which bears witness to the conservatism of his views in later life.

Nicolai also offered an early account of visual hallucinosis with preservation of insight and unrelated to madness: "suddenly I observed, at the distance of ten paces, the figure of a deceased person. I asked my wife whether she saw it. She saw nothing but being much alarmed … sent for the physician." The visions were beyond his control and could not be elicited at will. In a short story by Wilkie Collins entitled "Mrs. Zant and the Ghost," the narrator compares the main character to the "celebrated case of the bookseller, Nicolai, of Berlin" in regards to illusions "without being accompanied by derangement of the intellectual powers."

Goethe satirized Nicolai in Faust through the character of the "Proktophantasmist"—a name derived from prokto- (anus) and phantasmist (seer of phantoms). The parody mocked Nicolai's Enlightenment rationalism and his notorious claim to have cured himself of ghostly apparitions by applying leeches to his buttocks.

Nicolai died in 1811 in Berlin.

Nicolai's Bildniss und Selbsbiographie was published by Moses Samuel Löwe in the Bildnisse jetzt lebender Berliner Gelehrter, in 1806.

== Sources ==
- Chisholm, Hugh, ed. (1911). "Nicolai, Christoph Friedrich" . Encyclopædia Britannica. Vol. 19 (11th ed.). Cambridge University Press. p. 662.
- Stenbock-Fermor, Elisabeth (1969). "Bulgakov's The Master and Margarita and Goethe's Faust". The Slavic and East European Journal. 13 (3). [JSTOR]
