= Blaise Nicholas Le Sueur =

German painter

Blaise Sueur
- Born: 29 October 1714; Paris, France
- Died: 19 January 1783 (aged 68); Berlin, Prussia

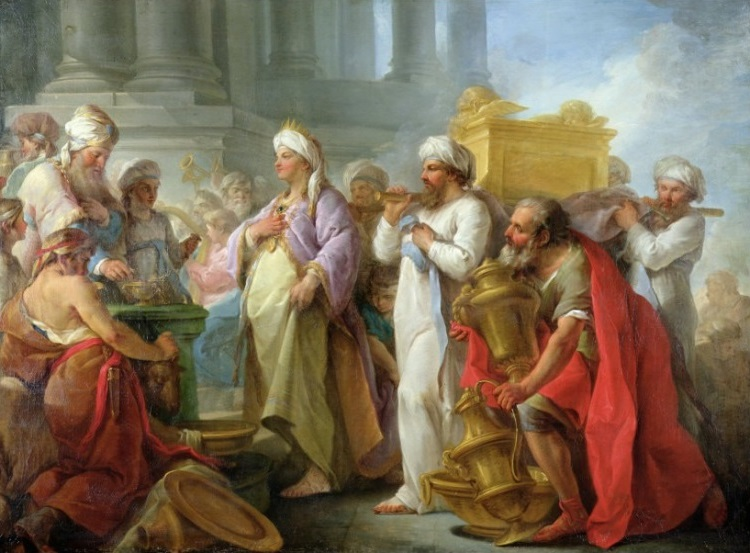
Le Sueur's Solomon before the ark of the covenant (1747)

Blaise Nicholas Le Sueur (29 October 1714 – 19 January 1783) was a German painter and engraver of allegorical and historical subjects. As director of the Berlin Academy of Art, he was influential in the development of the landscape painter Jacob Philipp Hackert and historical painter Bernhard Rode. Although he was director of the academy, he gave instruction to students informally, in his home, and only in basic drawing.

Preceded by	Director; Berlin Academy of Art; 1756 – 19 January 1783	Succeeded by Bernhard Rode
