= Henriette-Félicité Tassaert =

German artist (1766–1818)

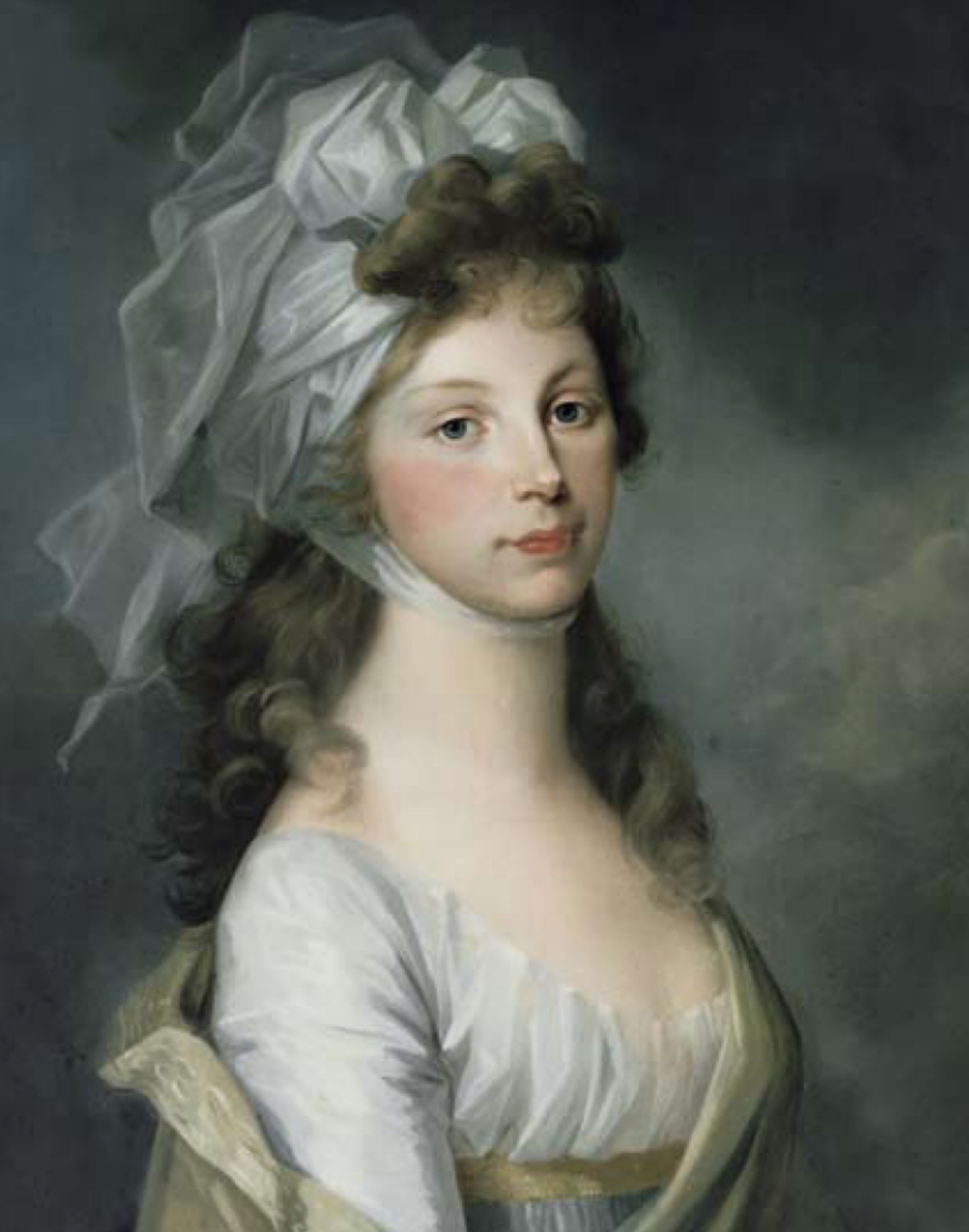
Portrait of Queen Luise of Prussia, oil on canvas, 1797

Henriette-Félicité Tassaert (4 May 1766 – 8 June 1818) was a German painter of Flemish extraction.

== Biography ==
Born in Paris, Tassaert was a member of the Tassaert family of artists. She was the daughter of sculptor Jean-Pierre-Antoine Tassaert and miniaturist Marie-Edmée Moreau, who were her first teachers. She then trained at the Prussian Academy of Arts, studying under Johann Christoph Frisch, Anton Graff, and Daniel Chodowiecki, whose letters remain an important source of information about her biography. While there she also came to know the work of the pastellist Joseph Friedrich August Darbes, who was also an engraver and who had produced prints after some of her father's work; she in turn engraved Darbes' portrait of Friedrich Wilhelm II.

She planned to travel to Dresden for further study, but the trip required the consent of Frederick the Great, who refused, and she did not visit that city until 1787, after his death. She spent six months in study there, staying in the quarters of Sophie Dinglinger and copying a number of works from the Gemäldegalerie Alte Meister in oil and pastel. In 1787 she submitted some work to the Berlin Akademie, and that same year was made an honorary member after they met with acclaim; she continued exhibiting in that city until 1816.

Her father died in 1788, whereupon she was granted a stipend of 200 thalers to allow her to continue her studies while supporting her family. It had long been intended by her family that she marry Johann Gottfried Schadow, a pupil of her parents; in the event, in 1792, she married instead a French lawyer named Louis Robert. She died in Berlin.

Tassaert's output included large numbers of copies of contemporary works as well as original portraits, and during her career she submitted 127 works to the various salons in Berlin. Her preferred medium was pastel, and at her death a large number of such works in various genres was donated to the Kupferstichkabinett by her family; many were later auctioned off, and have since vanished from the record.
