= Philippe Joseph Tassaert =

- Infancy, engraving from Tassaert's Three Ages of Man, 1768
- Born: 18 March 1732; Antwerp, Habsburg Netherlands
- Died: 6 October 1803 (aged 71); London, Great Britain
- Known for: Engraving
- Movement: Neoclassicism
- Relatives: Jean-Pierre-Antoine Tassaert brother
- Family: Tassaert family

Philippe Joseph Tassaert (18 March 1732 – 6 October 1803) was a Flemish painter, draughtsman, mezzotint engraver, and art dealer, hailing from the Tassaert family of artists.

== Biography ==
Philippe Joseph Tassaert was the son of the diamond merchant Jean Pierre Tassaert II (born 1700) and his wife, Claire Marie Brandts, and the grandson of the Antwerp painter Jean Pierre Tassaert I (1651–1724). While his older brother, Jean-Pierre-Antoine, chose a career in sculpture and left his native country at a very young age, Philippe Joseph remained in Antwerp, where he studied painting and copperplate engraving. In 1756, he was admitted as a master into the Guild of Saint Luke. Shortly afterwards, Tassaert moved to London and for a certain period worked as an assistant to the portait painter Thomas Hudson. Following a trip to Ireland – where he married Brigitte Morgan – he returned to Antwerp, where his three sons were baptized in 1757, 1758, and 1759. In 1769, he moved back to London, where he settled permanently. That same year, he joined the Society of Artists of Great Britain and participated in their exhibitions up to 1785. From 1775 to 1777 he was president of the Society.

Between 1785 and 1790, Tassaert resided in Rome. Upon returning to London, he worked as a picture restorer and art dealer, notably serving as an agent for James Christie over the Orléans Collection. For Christie, Tassaert catalogued – and likely restored – various paintings. During the Regency era, he restored paintings for the Prince of Wales, the future George IV. Tassaert mainly produced pastiches or copies of works by Old Masters. His work as an engraver included historical and mythological subjects copied after Rubens using the mezzotint etching technique, as well as portraits and genre scenes copied after Maratta, Carlo Dolci, Van Dyck, Poussin and others. Tassaert died in London on October 6, 1803, aged 71.

== Gallery ==
Youth, engraving from Tassaert's Three Ages of Man, 1768

Middle Age, engraving from Tassaert's Three Ages of Man, 1768

Old Age, engraving from Tassaert's Three Ages of Man, 1768

Bacchanalians, engraving after Nicolas Poussin

Jonah is Thrown Overboard, engraving after Peter Paul Rubens

Virgin and Child, engraving after Carlo Dolci

Christ and the Adulteress, engraving after Peter Paul Rubens

The Painter's family, engraving after Peter Paul Rubens

== Bibliography ==
- "Tassaert, Philippe Joseph or Joseph Philippe". Benezit Dictionary of Artists. Oxford: Oxford University Press. 2011. doi:10.1093/benz/9780199773787.article.B00179762.
- Leclerc, Guy. "Biographie du peintre et graveur Philippe Joseph Tassaert 1732-1803". memoiredesartistes.free.fr.
- "Philippe Joseph Tassaert". britishmuseum.org. British Museum.
