= Daniel Chodowiecki =

German painter and printmaker (1726–1801)

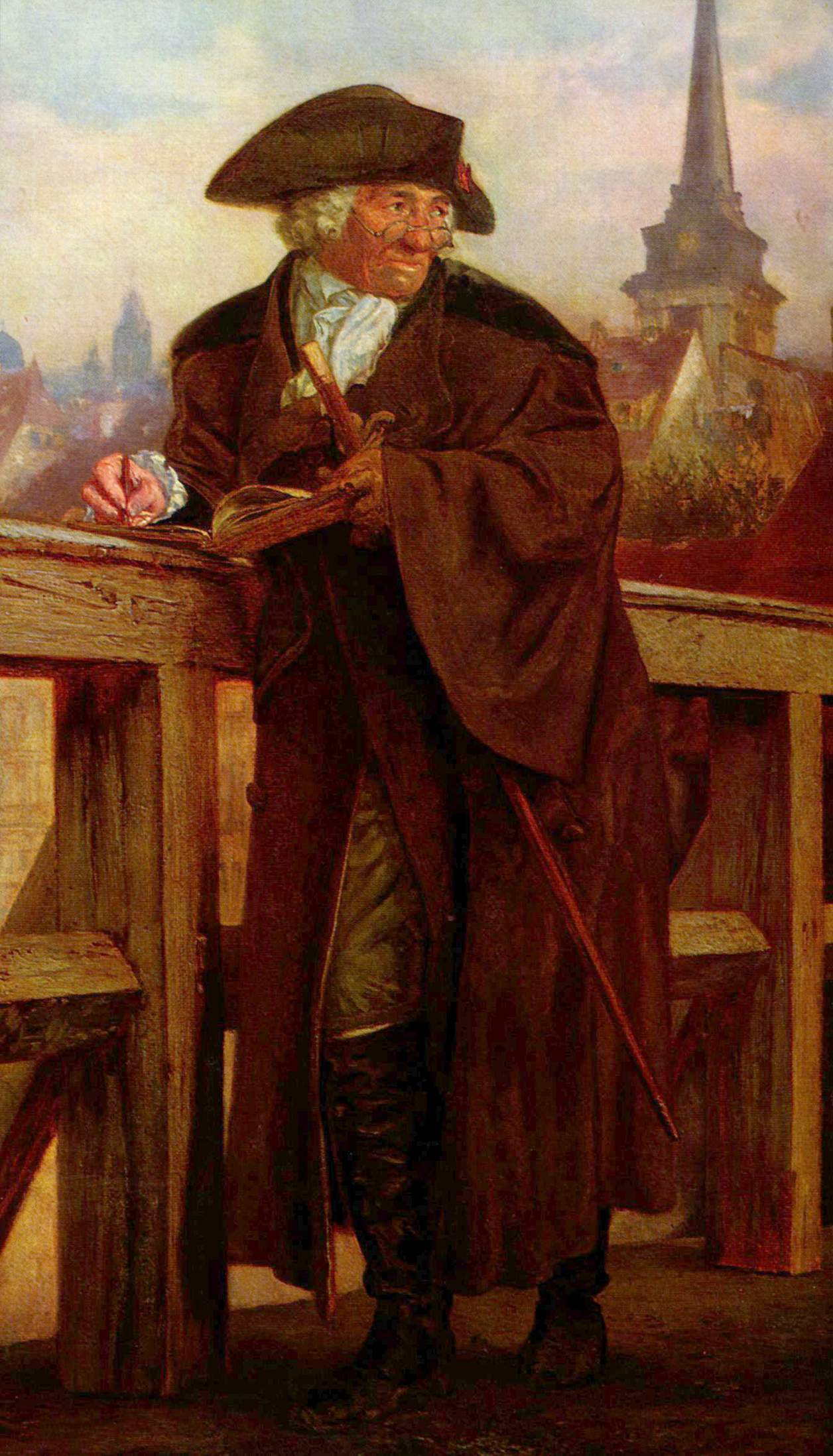
Portrait of Daniel Chodowiecki, painted posthumously by Adolph von Menzel in 1859

Daniel Niklaus Chodowiecki (16 October 1726 – 7 February 1801) was a German painter and printmaker of Huguenot and Polish ancestry, who is most famous as an etcher. He spent most of his life in Berlin, and became the director of the Berlin Academy of Art.

== Family ==
He was born in the city of Danzig (Gdańsk) in Poland, he kept close to the Huguenot scene, due to his ancestry.

According to Chodowiecki himself, his Polish nobleman paternal ancestor Bartłomiej Chodowiecki lived in the 16th century in Greater Poland, though this is not confirmed by independent records. Gottfried Chodowiecki, Daniel's father, was a tradesman in Danzig and his mother, Henriette Ayrer, of Swiss ancestry, was a Huguenot. Daniel's grandfather Christian was also a Danzig tradesman, who had moved his business there from Toruń. When his father died, both Daniel (aged 16) and his younger brother Gottfried Chodowiecki went to live with their uncle in Berlin, who offered to educate them. In Germany Daniel received artistic training from the painter Haid in Augsburg. His brother also became a painter.

He and his wife Jeanne Barez (1726–1785) had three daughters, Jeannette (b. 1761, married the French reformed preacher Jacques Papin), Suzanne (1763–1819) and Henriette (1770–1880). Jeannette's daughter Marianne Gretschel née Chodowiecka Papin (1794–1870) and her son Heinrich Papin (1786–1839) also became artists.

== Art ==
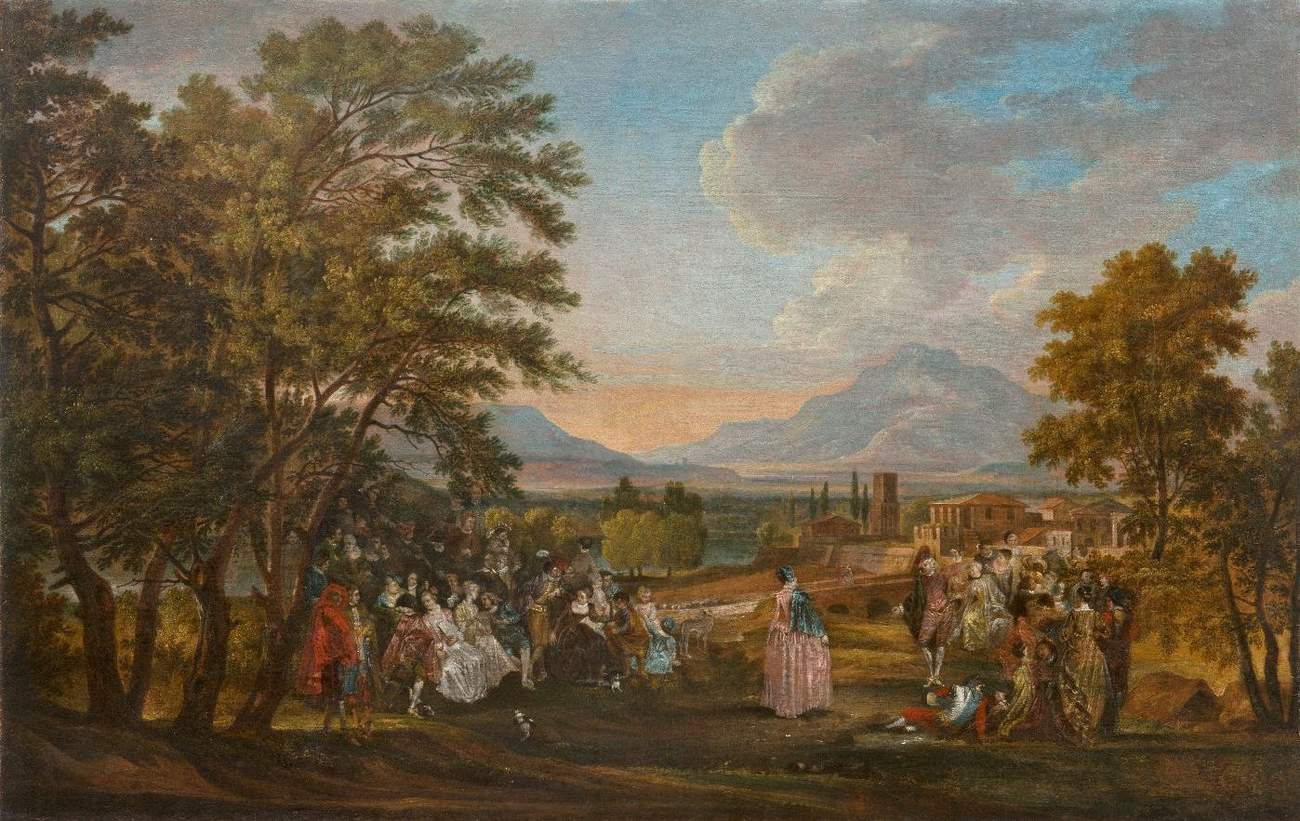
Minuet in the park, 1760s (National Museum in Warsaw)

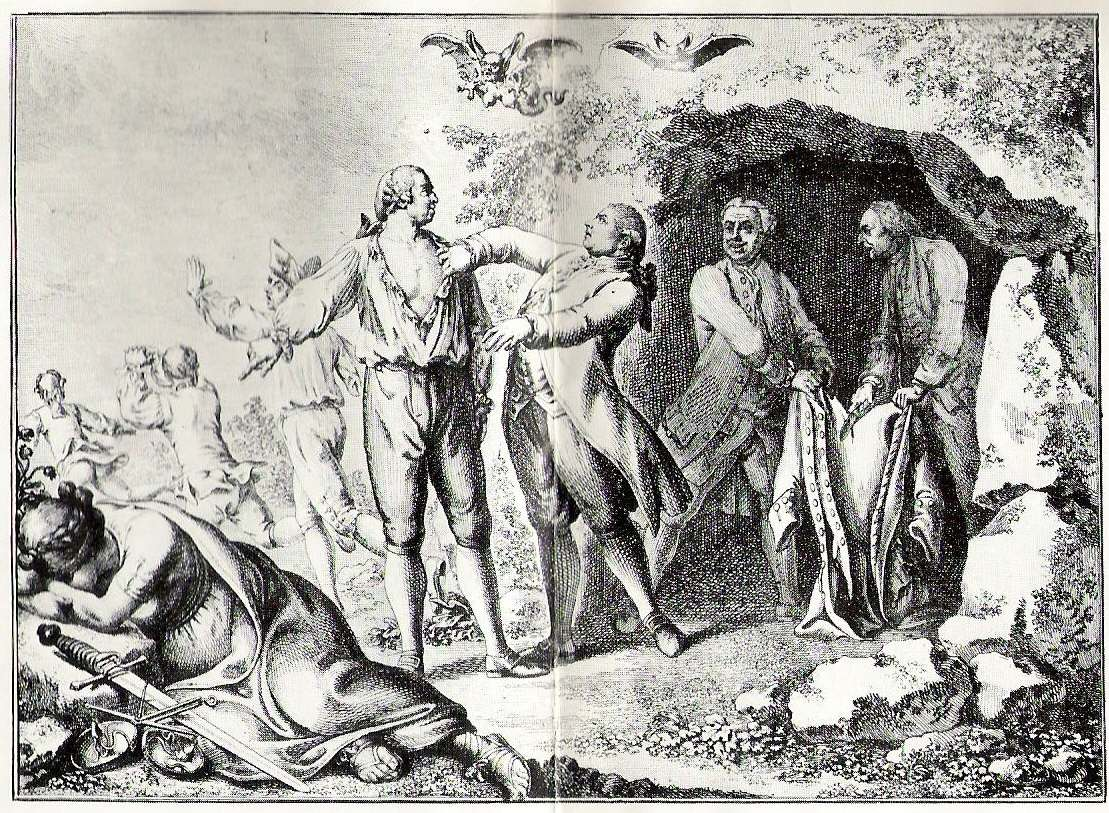
Cartoon etching by Chodowiecki, 1781, on the Partition of Poland

Soon Daniel was able to earn a living by painting. He was admitted to the Berlin Academy in 1764 and became vice-director under Bernhard Rode in 1788. He found his true calling and became the most famous German graphic artist of his time. His works include several thousand etchings, usually rather small, and many drawings and paintings. His book illustrations embrace almost all the great classics. His prints represent in great detail the life of the bourgeoisie during the Zopfstil period, a time between Rococo and Classicism. In 1797 Chodowiecki was appointed director of the Academy of Arts in Berlin, where he died on 7 February 1801. The bulk of his work was in illustrating scientific books by Basedow, Buffon, Lavater, Pestalozzi and others. He also painted many portraits of Polish nobility and was interested in Huguenot and Polish history as well, making some paintings on the subjects. He was in tune with the developing spirit of the age, and many works reflect the cult of sensibility, and then the revolutionary and German nationalist feelings of the end of the century.

In printmaking, he is credited with the invention of the deliberate remarque, a small sketch on a plate lying outside the main image. These were originally little sketches or doodles by artists, not really meant to be seen, but Chodowiecki turned them into "bonus items" for collectors.

Chodowiecki, though speaking only French and German (due to his offices in the Huguenot French community in Berlin he often spoke French), many times also declared his Polish allegiance and had his son Isaac Heinrich, born in Berlin, painted as a very young child with a Polish outfit and haircut. After the Partitions of Poland Chodowiecki wrote to Gräfin Solms-Laubach: "From my father's side I am Polish, a descendant of a brave nation which will soon vanish". In a letter to pl:Józef Łęski, a Polish astronomer, he wrote: "I consider it an honour to be a genuine Pole, even though I am now living in Germany". Because of his mother's and his wife's Huguenot descent he was very close to the Huguenots of Berlin. Nearly all his life and career was spent in Germany, writing in German and living in Berlin from the age of almost 17.

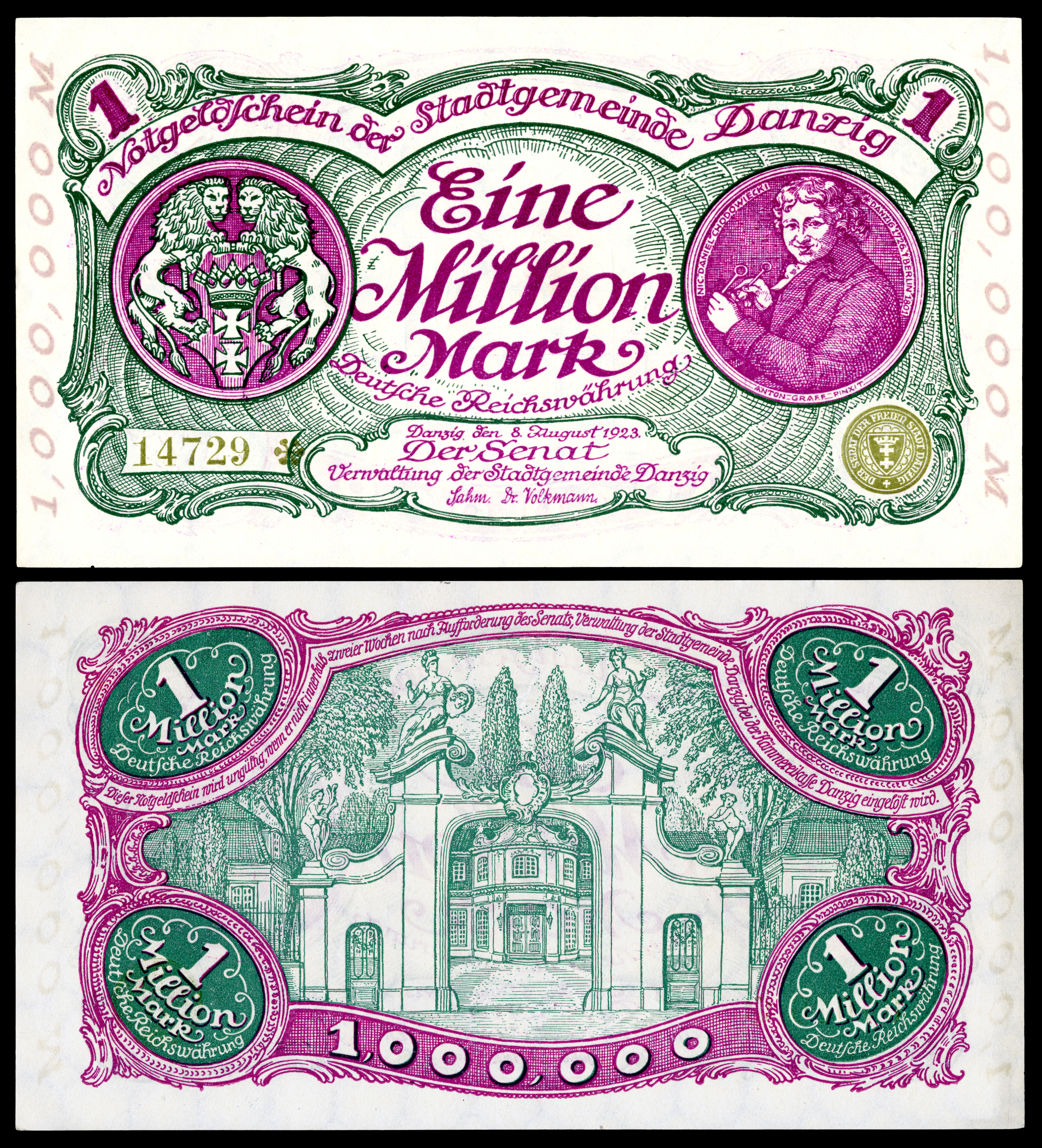
Chodowiecki depicted on a 1 million papiermark note (1923)

One of his most popular books is the "Journey from Berlin to Danzig" (German: "Die Reise von Berlin nach Danzig", 1773) with many illustrations. He purchased a horse rather than going by stage coach. This was his first return after 30 years absence and he went specifically to see his elderly mother and sisters in Danzig again. He made only one more trip to Danzig afterwards, to his mother's funeral. He describes and illustrates towns and people in Pomerania and Prussia on the way.

Chodowiecki is buried at the Französischer Friedhof cemetery in Berlin.

== Sources ==
- Wolfgang Plat, Die Reise nach Danzig, Mit Daniel Chodowiecki durch Pommern

Preceded by Bernhard Rode	Director; Berlin Academy of Art; 1797–1801	Succeeded by
