= Preußisches Obertribunal =

Prussian supreme court (1703–1879)

Prussian Supreme Tribunal
- Preußisches Obertribunal (German)
- Established: 1703 (as the Oberappellationsgericht zu Berlin); 1748 (as the forth panel of the Kammergericht); 30 November 1782 (as an independent court)
- Dissolved: 30 September 1879
- Jurisdiction: Kingdom of Prussia (chiefly)
- Language: German

The Preußisches Obertribunal, abbreviated PrObTr (English: Prussian Supreme Tribunal), was between 1703 and 1879 either the sole or one of the supreme courts of the Kingdom of Prussia. The court played a significant role in shaping Prussia's legal system and had major influence on the administration of justice in the kingdom.

The court was founded by Frederick I in 1703 as the Oberappellationsgericht zu Berlin (Superior Court of Appeals in Berlin) and underwent several reorganizations. In 1748, it was disestablished and integrated into the Kammergericht, where it became the Kammergericht's fourth senate. In 1782, the tribunal was separated from that court and named Geheimes Obertribunal (Secret Supreme Tribunal). In the wake of the German revolutions of 1848–1849, it was renamed to Obertribunal (Supreme Tribunal), before it was disestablished in 1879 and succeeded by the Reichsgericht, which became the sole supreme court of the German Empire.

== History ==
=== Oberappellationsgericht zu Berlin (1703–1748) ===
The Oberappellationsgericht zu Berlin (Superior Court of Appeals in Berlin) was founded in 1703 by Frederick I, after the Prussian king had obtained a limited privilegium de non appellando. The privilegium generale de non appellando limitatum, which Holy Roman Emperor Leopold I had granted on 16 December 1702, allowed Prussia to establish a supreme court, whose decisions could not be appealed to the two supreme courts of the Holy Roman Empire – the Reichskammergericht and the Aulic Council. The privilegium was limited to cases involving not more than 2,500 gold guilders. The court, at least initially, had local jurisdiction for the Prussian provinces of Farther Pomerania, the Duchy of Magdeburg, the Hochstift Halberstadt (a Hochstift), the Duchy of Cleves, the County of Mark and the Principality of Minden. In 1716, the court was merged with Orange-Tribunal, which had responsibilities for Meurs, Lingen und Teklenburg.

With an order (Patent) dated 18 May 1748, the Oberappellationsgericht zu Berlin was abolished together with all other superior courts in Berlin, except the Geheimer Justizrat (Secret Judicial Council), and the Ravensburger Appellationsgericht (Ravensburg Court of Appeal) with the goal of forming a single supreme judicial institution for the whole of Prussia.

=== Fourth senate of the Kammergericht (1748–1782) ===
Under the date 31 May 1746, the Prussian king obtained an unlimited privilegium de non appellando (a privilegium generale de non appellando illimitatum) for Prussia from Holy Roman Emperor Francis I. This resulted in the establishment of a new supreme court in 1748, which at first remained unnamed. This court consisted of four senates (panels), the first three senates being mainly built out of the former Kammergericht (Chamber Court), while the fourth was chiefly formed out of the former Oberappellationsgericht zu Berlin. Quickly, the first three senates became again known as the Kammergericht, while the superior forth senate emerged as the Tribunal.

In 1772, the fourth senate was renamed to Geheimes Obertribunal (Secret Supreme Tribunal). At this time, only two supreme courts of Prussia remained, the Secret Supreme Tribunal and the Ostpreußisches Tribunal zu Königsberg (the East Prussian Tribunal at Königsberg), which, however, was soon – probably in 1774 – subordinated to the Geheimes Obertribunal.

=== Geheimes Obertribunal (Secret Supreme Tribunal) (1782–1852) ===
==== Sole Prussian supreme court (1782–1815) ====
On 30 November 1782, the Geheimes Obertribunal was separated from the Kammergericht. The Kammergericht was subordinated to the Geheimes Obertribunal and the Geheimes Obertribunal gained local jurisdiction for the whole of Prussia. The Kammergericht continued its duties with three senates: the Kriminaldeputation (the criminal deputation), the Instruktionssenat (the court of appeal for the Kurmark) and the Oberappellationssenat (the court of appeal for the four high courts of the Margraviate of Brandenburg, i.e. the Instruktionssenat of the Kammergericht, the Altmärkisches Obergericht, the Uckermärkisches Obergericht [until 1789] and the Neumärkische Regierung). The Secret Supreme Tribunal thereby became the supreme Prussian court of appeal in the third instance and heard appeals against decisions by the Oberappellationssenat of the Kammergericht and the other high courts of the Prussian provinces. The Secret Supreme Tribunal was directly subordinate to the Prussian Department of Justice or, from 1808 onwards, to the Prussian Ministry of Justice.

==== One of Prussia's supreme courts (1815–1849) ====
Due to the Congress of Vienna, Prussia made huge territorial gains in 1815. Prussia now consisted no longer of one unified area of law, but three: the area of French law in the Left Bank of the Rhine and the Duchy of Berg, the area of the ius commune in New Western Pomerania and Ehrenbreitstein and the Prussian law region in the rest of Prussia. This legal fragmentation resulted in the formation of new supreme appellate courts in Prussia, thus ending the supremacy of the Tribunal.

At this time, five Prussian supreme courts existed:

1. the Rheinischer Revisions- und Kassationshof (Rhenish Court of Appeal and Cassation) – competent for the area of French law,
2. the Revisionshof zu Berlin (Berlin Court of Appeal) – competent for the ius commune-area of the right bank of the Rhine-territory of the Regierungsbezirk Koblenz,
3. the Oberappellationsgericht zu Greifswald (Court of Appeal at Greifswald) – competent for the ius commune-area of New Western Pomerania,
4. the Oberappellationsgericht zu Posen (High Court of Appeal at Posen) – competent for the Prussian law-area of the Province of Posen and
5. the Geheimes Obertribunal – competent for all other Prussian law-territories of the kingdom.

In 1833, the pre-eminent position of the Geheimes Obertribunal within the Prussian legal system was fortified once more: Due to an ordinance dated 14 December 1833, (Note: Section 26 of the Verordnung über das Rechtsmittel der Revision und der Nichtigkeitsbeschwerde of 14 December 1833 (PrGS. 1833, S. 302).) it regained the sole responsibility to decide certain nullity appeals (Nichtigkeitsbeschwerden) and appeals on points of law (Revisionen) in civil disputes if the amount of the action in question reached the sum necessary for appeal.

During the Vormärz, the Geheimes Obertribunal, however, lost its appellate jurisdiction in certain criminal cases of a political nature by virtue of a Cabinet Order dated 25 April 1835. (Note: Allerhöchste Kabinetsorder, betreffend die Bestellung des Kammergerichts zum ausschließenden Gerichtshofe der Monarchie wegen aller und jeder Verbrechen und Vergehungen wider die Verfassung, die öffentliche Ordnung und Ruhe, sowohl der sämmtlichen Staaten des Königreichs, als auch der übrigen Staaten des Deutschen Bundes of 25 April 1835 (PrGS. 1835, S. 47).) These cases were reassigned to the Kammergericht, in its capacity as Geheimer Justizrat.

=== Obertribunal (Supreme Tribunal) (1853–1879) ===
==== Sole Prussian supreme court again (1853–1867) ====
The German revolutions of 1848–1849 resulted in the promulgation of the Prussian constitutions of 1848 and 1850 which, among other things, contained programmatic statements about the organisation of the courts (Article 91 of the 1848 constitution (Note: Article 91: Die noch bestehenden beiden obersten Gerichtshöfe sollen zu einem einzigen vereinigt werden.) and Articles 92 and 116 of the 1850 constitution). Article 92 of the Constitution of 1850 proclaimed:

Artikel 92: Es soll in Preußen nur Ein [sic] oberster Gerichtshof bestehen.

Article 92: There shall be only One Supreme Court in Prussia.

— 1850 Constitution of Prussia (Verfassungsurkunde für den Preußischen Staat vom 31. Januar 1850) (Note: PrGS. 1850, S. 31.)

Before the envisaged unification of the Prussian supreme courts was set into motion, the Geheimes Obertribunal was first renamed to Obertribunal (State Tribunal) by virtue of an ordinance dated 2 January 1849 (Note: Section 27 of the Verordnung über die Aufhebung der Privatgerichtsbarkeit und des eximirten Gerichtsstandes, sowie über die anderweitige Organisation der Gerichte of 2 January 1849 (PrGs 1849, S. 1).) to take into account the new principle of publicity (Öffentlichkeitsgrundsatz) in German procedural law. Then the unification was brought to life by a law dated 17 March 1852, (Note: PrGS. 1852, S. 73.) which in its Section 1 merged the two remaining supreme courts of Prussia, the Rheinischer Revisions- und Kassationshof and the Obertribunal into a new court, again named Obertribunal. The merger of the courts came into effect on 1 January 1853. The other Prussian supreme courts, the Revisionshof zu Berlin, the Oberappellationsgericht zu Greifswald and the Oberappellationsgericht zu Posen had already been disestablished earlier.

==== Establishment of a short-lived second Prussian Supreme Court (1876–1874) ====
After the Austro-Prussian War in 1866, the Oberappellationsgericht zu Berlin (Superior Court of Appeals in Berlin) was formed to hear appeals from the new Prussian provinces: Schleswig-Holstein (including Saxe-Lauenburg), Hanover, Hesse-Nassau and the Principality of Waldeck and Pyrmont. This new court was short-lived and in 1874 it was merged into the Tribunal.

==== Decline and abolishment (1870–1879) ====
In 1870, the Reichsoberhandelsgericht was established in Leipzig as a court of the North German Federation and later of the German Empire. As a result, the Prussian Supreme Tribunal lost its final appellate jurisdiction concerning commercial and promissory notes law. After this major loss of appellate jurisdiction, the Prussian Supreme Tribunal was abolished altogether on 30 September 1879, (Note: Section 12 of the Preußisches Ausführungsgesetz zum Gerichtsverfassungsgesetz of 24 April 1878 (PrGS. 1878, S. 230).) as a direct consequence of the establishment of the Reichsgericht, which became the sole supreme court of the German Empire. The establishment of the Reichsgericht coincided with the entry into force of the Reichsjustizgesetze (Reich justice laws), which unified major areas of German civil and criminal procedure with the codification of the Gerichtsverfassungsgesetz (Courts Constitution Act), the Zivilprozessordnung (Civil Procedure Code), the Strafprozessordnung (Code of Criminal Procedure) and the Insolvenzordnung (Insolvency Code).

== Collection and publication of decisions ==
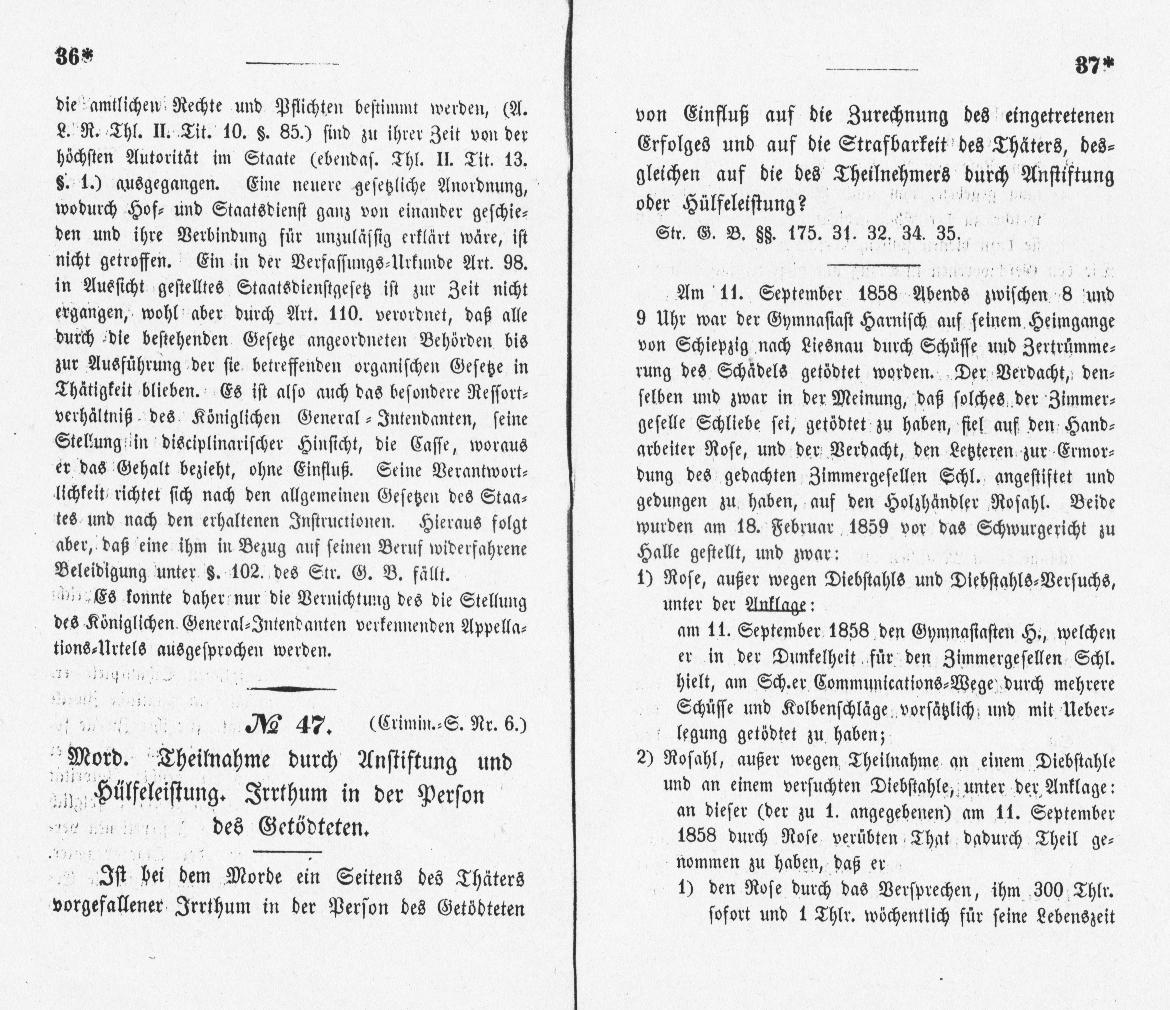
Pages 36 and 37 of volume 42 of the PrObTrE containing the beginning of the notable Rose-Rosahl case

Following a cabinet order dated 19 July 1832, the Obertribunal had to give reasons for all its decisions, but its reasoned decisions generally remained unpublished. This was rectified in 1836 or 1837, when a state publication series for the decisions of the court was installed named Entscheidungen des Königlichen Obertribunals (Decisions of the Royal Supreme Tribunal; often abbreviated to PrObTrE). At first, only private law decisions were published, because the court had no competencies for criminal law, but after it gained the respective subject-matter jurisdiction, decisions concerning criminal law were also published beginning in 1849.

Of its criminal cases, the 1859 Rose-Rosahl case (PrObTrE 42, 36) concerning the interplay of error in persona and incitement – and factually the accidental murder of a 17 year old student – is especially famous. According to the German legal scholars Fritjof Haft and Jörg Eisele, hardly any other decision has influenced the discussion of German criminal law scholarship more than this decision by the Tribunal. The Tribunal decided that the error on the part of the perpetrator regarding the identity of the murder victim (error in persona) is irrelevant for the criminal liability of the instigator, as the confusion of the victim by the perpetrator is within the limits of what is foreseeable and that the instigator should therefore be punished for incitement to murder.

In the PrObTrE approximately 500 of the court's most important decisions were published. The series had major influence on contemporary Prussian jurisprudence.

== Presidents and other important judges ==
=== Presidents of the Oberappellationsgericht zu Berlin (1703–1748) ===
No.	Portrait	Name	Tenure	Ref.
1		Eusebius von Brandt (1642–1706)	20 December 1703 – 1706	
2		Christian Friedrich von Bartholdi (1668–1714)	30 January 1707 – 1714	
3		Ludwig Otto von Plotho (1663–1731)	1 October 1714 – 1731	
-		Balthasar Conrad zum Broich	5 September 1731 (Note: He was appointed (Bestallung) on 5 September 1731 but did not take office (introduciert) due to another posting at the Kammergericht on 19 September 1731.)	
4		Samuel von Cocceji (1679–1755)	19 September 1731 – 1737	
5		Georg Dietloff von Arnim-Boitzenburg (1679–1753)	23 January 1738 – 21 May 1748 (dissolution of the court)	

=== Presidents of the fourth senate of the Kammergericht (1748–1778) ===
No.	Portrait	Name	Tenure	Ref.
6 (1)		Georg Dietloff von Arnim-Boitzenburg (1679–1753)	1748 – 1748	
7 (2)		Heinrich IX, Count Reuss of Köstritz (1711–1780)	21 January 1752 – 1763	
8 (3)		Maximilian von Fürst und Kupferberg (1717–1790)	31 October 1763 – 1770	
9 (4)		Karl Abraham Zedlitz (1731–1793)	18 November 1770 – 18 January 1771	

=== Presidents of the Obertribunal (1778–1879) ===
No.	Portrait	Name	Tenure	Ref.
10 (1)		Ernst Friedemann von Münchhausen (1724–1784)	5 February 1771 – 1784	
11 (2)		Eberhard von der Recke (1744–1816)	30 December 1784 – 1785	
12 (3)		Wolfgang Ferdinand von Dörnberg (1724–1793)	1 March 1785 – 1788	
- (Recke's second term)		Eberhard von der Recke (1744–1816)	1788 – 1802	
13 (4)		Johann Friedrich von Koenen (1767–1805)	28 December 1802 – 3 June 1805 (his death)	
14 (5)		Heinrich Dietrich von Grolman (1740–1840)	1805 – 7 January 1833	
15 (6)		Wilhelm Friedrich Sack (1773–1854)	21 January 1833 – 30 September 1844	
16 (7)		Heinrich Gottlob von Mühler (1780–1857)	1844 – 20 December 1854	
17 (8)		Alexander von Uhden (1798–1878)	1854 – 1878 (Note: After the death of v. Uhden, the presidency of the court remained vacant until the end of the court in 1879.) (his death)	

=== Other important judges ===
- Wilhelm Bornemann
- Karl Friedrich Eichhorn
- Georg Friedrich Puchta
- Hermann von Schelling
- Carl Gottlieb Svarez
- Benedikt Waldeck
