= Ernst Ferdinand Klein =

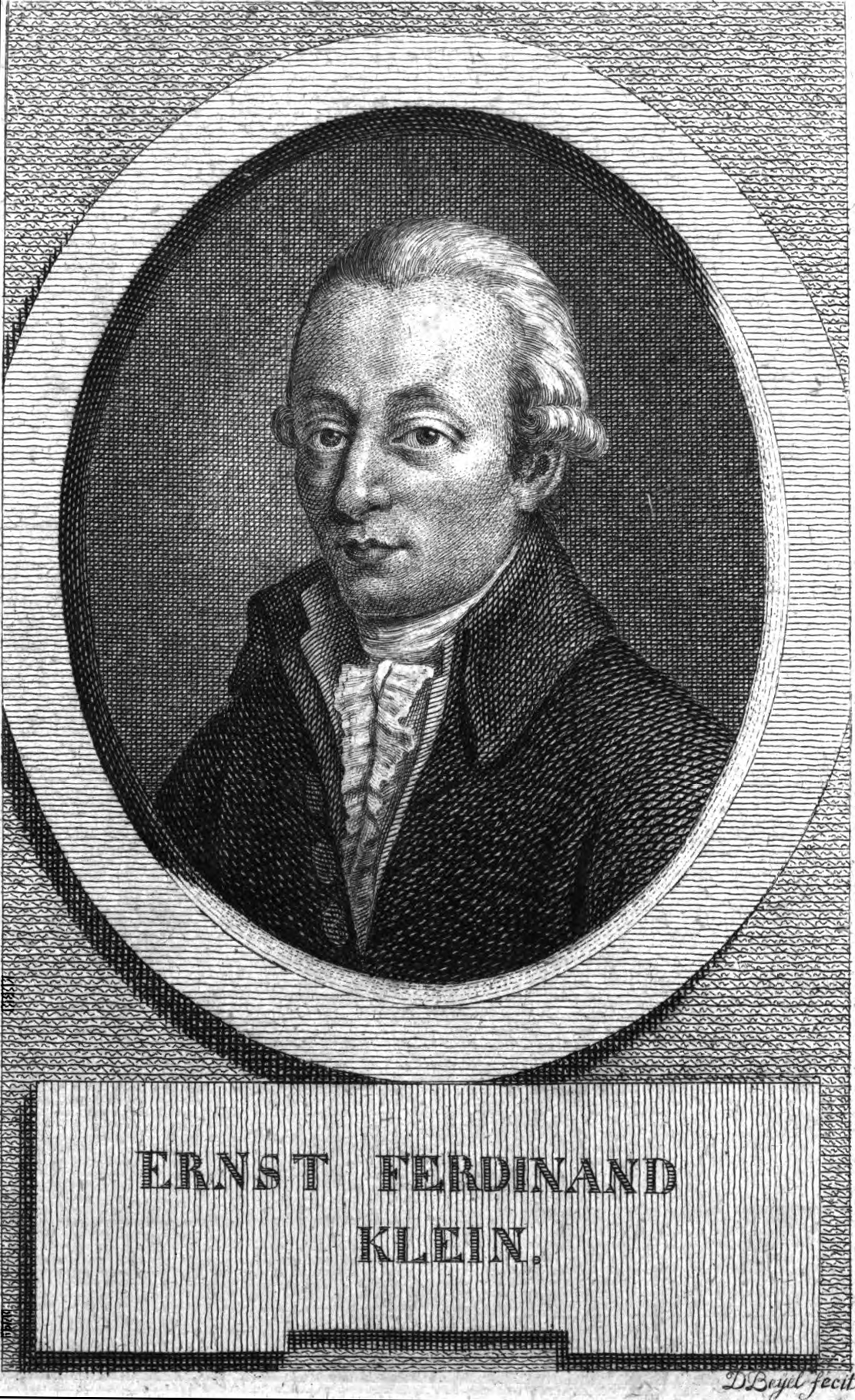
Ernst Ferdinand Klein

Ernst Ferdinand Klein (3 September 1744 in Breslau – 18 March 1810 in Berlin) was a German jurist and prominent representative of the Berlin Enlightenment.

== Career ==
Klein studied law at Halle under Daniel Nettelbladt, a follower of Christian Wolff, before practising law in Breslau. In 1781 he moved to Berlin, where he served in the Prussian justice department as an adviser to Frederick's High Chancellor Johann H. C. von Carmer and worked with Carl Gottlieb Svarez to co-author the reforming Prussian Civil Code, the Allgemeines Landrecht. He was active in the Mittwochsgesellschaft (Wednesday Society): his Freiheit und Eigenthum (1790) was presented as a set of dialogues between members of the society. In 1791 he returned to Halle, and in 1800 was once again in Berlin as an Upper Court Councillor.

== Works ==
- Freiheit und Eigenthum [Freedom and Property], 1790
- Grundsätze des gemeinen deutschen und preußischen peinlichen Rechts. Halle 1796 (2nd ed. Halle 1799).
- Grundsätze der natürlichen Rechtswissenschaft, 1797
