= List of justice ministers of Prussia =

The list of justice ministers of Prussia lists the Prussian ministers of justice from the founding of the General Directorate (General-Ober-Finanz-Kriegs-und Domainen-Direktorium) in 1723 until the completion of the federalization (Verreichlichung) of the Prussian justice system during the Gleichschaltung in 1935. The first officeholder was Christoph von Katsch (1723–1729) and the last caretaker of the office was Franz Gürtner (1934–1935).

The office thereby existed during very different political contexts for Prussia: From 1723 until 1806, while Prussia was – at least formally – part of the Holy Roman Empire. From 1806 until 1871 as an office of an independent Kingdom of Prussia. And from 1871 onward as an office of a state of the German Empire (the Free State of Prussia since 1918). The empire itself was a monarchy until its abolition in 1918, before it became the Weimar Republic and finally was transformed into Nazi Germany in 1933.

The German Empire had a separate federal State Secretary of Justice since 1876, who headed the Reichsjustizamt. In 1919 the federal office became known as the Reich Minister of Justice, who headed the Reich Ministry of Justice.

== History of the office ==
Modern ministerial administration began in Prussia under King Frederick William I. From around 1723, his five ministers each had responsibility for a province and specific areas. At the same time, three ministers were always given the role of Justice Minister; They could only make important decisions together. The main tasks were nominating judges, training of lawyers, administration of the judicial apparatus (buildings and personnel), registries (especially the land registers) and advising the king. This system was maintained until 1737 and was later temporarily reactivated.

Under King Frederick II, the systematic drafting of laws began. This task was given to a Grand Chancellor (also known as Senior Minister of Justice and Chef of Justice), newly created in 1747. At times, there was also ongoing administration in parallel by other justice ministers; especially under Grand Chancellor Jariges, who worked with four other ministers. Typical responsibilities of these additional justice ministers were the management of the Criminal Department, the Military Justice System or the Justice Administration as well as the supervision of the Provincial Justice System. From 1762 until the 19th century, "spiritual matters" (churches and education) were also part of the remit of the Justice Ministers (Zedlitz, Wöllner, Massow).

== List of ministers ==
=== 1723–1737: Collegiate Principle ===
In 1723, the General Directorate (General-Ober-Finanz-Kriegs-und Domainen-Direktorium) was founded by Frederick William I. Originally the General Directorate had five departments; the first four had regional competencies, while the fifth department dealt with judicial matters from all Prussian regions and directed and (secretly) controlled the other departments. This department was headed by Katsch. He is generally regarded as the first minister of justice of Prussia.

Name	Image	Term Start	Term End	Notes	Ref.
Christoph von Katsch		January 1723	1729	Katsch died in office.	
Johann Moritz von Viebahn		1729	April 1739	Viebahn died in office.	

=== 1737–1817: Ministers and Grand Chancellors ===
By cabinet decree (Kabinettsordre) dated 5 November 1737 Frederick William I reorganized the Prussian administration of justice and established Samuel von Cocceji as "Ministre Chef de Justice" who should inspect all aspects of the Prussian administration of justice. After the death of Frederick William I, Frederick the Great did not use the title "Ministre Chef de Justice" but left Cocceji in place and elevated his position to become the inaugural Prussian Grand Chancellor in 1747.

==== Ministres Chef de Justice and Grand Chancellors (1737–1808) ====
Name	Image	Term Start	Term End	Notes	Ref.
Samuel von Cocceji	Samuel von Cocceji	5 November 1737	24 October 1755	Cocceji headed the Prussian administration of justice as Ministre Chef de Justice (appointed on 5 November 1737) and was made Grand Chancellor (Großkanzler) on 8 March 1747. Cocceji died in office.	
Philipp Joseph von Jariges		November 1755	9 October 1770	Jariges died in office.	
Maximilian von Fürst und Kupferberg	Carl Joseph Maximilian von Fürst und Kupferberg	14 November 1770	11 December 1779	Fürst was dismissed by Frederick II due to his handling of the Miller Arnold case.	
Johann Heinrich von Carmer	Johann Heinrich Casimir Graf von Carmer	25 December 1779	7 January 1795	Carmer was dispensed from his duties at his own request by Frederick II.	
Heinrich Julius von Goldbeck		7 February 1795	26 August 1807	Goldbeck was minister of state and justice (Etats- und Justizminister) from 1789 to 1795 (see below) before he became Grand Chancellor and Chef de Justice. He was succeeded by Carl Friedrich von Beyme after the formation of the modern Prussian ministry of justice necessitated by the Prussian defeat at the Battle of Jena–Auerstedt in 1806.	

==== Other posts ====
Justizdepartement

Name	Image	Term start	Term end	Notes	Ref.
Levin Friedrich von Bismarck	Levin Friedrich von Bismarck	20 December 1746	14 April 1763	Bismarck was minister of state and justice (Etats- und Justizminister) with responsibility for criminal law matters (Criminalsachen). He requested his dismissal due to old age on 14 April 1763. His successor Fürst was appointed on 26 April 1763.	
Maximilian von Fürst und Kupferberg	Carl Joseph Maximilian von Fürst und Kupferberg	26 April 1763	1770	Management of the judiciary in several provinces	
Ernst Friedemann von Münchhausen	Wappen derer von Münchhausen	19 September 1763	1764	Münchhausen was minister of state and justice (Etats- und Justizminister). On 17 June 1764 he gained the spiritual department in Lutheran church and school matters (Geistliches Departement in lutherischen Kirchen- und Schulsachen). He was succeeded by Zedlitz in this office on 18 January 1771.	
Karl Abraham Zedlitz	Karl Abraham von Zedlitz	18 November 1770	17 December 1789 [or 3 December 1789]	Zedlitz was made minister of state and justice (Etats- und Justizminister) on 18 November 1770 with responsibility for the criminal department (Kriminaldepartement). Zedlitz was also made head of the Lutheran spiritual department (Lutherisches geistliches Departement) on 18 January 1771 [or 15 January 1771] and held it until 3 July 1788. He was dismissed in 1789 on his own wishes.	
Wolfgang Ferdinand von Dörnberg		28 Februar 1771	1793	Minister of Justice of the French Colony and Spiritual Affairs	
Eberhard von der Reck	Eberhard von der Reck	31 December 1784	1807	Reck (sometimes Recke) was made minister of state and justice (Etats- und Justizminister) in 1784 to replace the deceased Münchhausen.	
Johann Christoph von Wöllner	Johann Christoph von Wöllner	3 July 1788	1798	Wöllner was minister of state and justice (Etats- und Justizminister). He was made head of the spiritual department in Lutheran and Catholic matters. With his appointment the department of justice (Justizdepartement) was restructured: There were now not four, but five ministers of state and justice (Etats- und Justizminister): Zedlitz, Carmer, Dörnberg, Reck and Wöllner.	
Heinrich Julius von Goldbeck		11 December 1789	7 February 1795	Goldbeck was minister of state and justice (Etats- und Justizminister) and succeeded Zedlitz. On 7 February 1795 he became Grand Chancellor (see above).	
Albrecht Heinrich von Arnim		1798	15 July 1802	Arnim was minister of state and justice (Etats- und Justizminister). He was succeeded as head of the department for criminal matters (Kriminaldepartement) by grand chancellor Goldbeck on 15 July 1802	
Julius Eberhard von Massow		2 April 1798	1807	Massow was minister of state and justice (Etats- und Justizminister) and succeeded Wöllner in 2 April 1798. He headed the spiritual and school department.	
Johann Ludwig von Dorville		1763	1770		
Friedrich Wilhelm von Thulemeyer		1793	1807		

=== 1808–1848: Foundation of a modern Ministry of Justice and its separation into two entities ===
The modern Prussian Ministry of Justice was formally founded as an independent entity by cabinet decree on 25 November 1808 during the time of the Stein–Hardenberg Reforms. On 3 November 1817 the First Ministry of Justice for the Revision of Laws and for the Judicial Organisation of the new Provinces (Erstes Justizministerium zur Revision der Gesetzgebung und zur Justizorganisation der neuen Provinzen) was formed as a separate entity which would deal with the revision of Prussia's laws. This ministry was, however, quickly abolished again in December 1819. The business of judicial organisation was transferred to the Immediate Justice Organisation Commission in Berlin (Immediat-Justiz-Organisations-Kommission zu Berlin) and from 1823 onward all business was dealt with within one unified justice ministry. On 9 February 1832 the former idea of two separate entities was revived and by cabinet decree of the same date the Department for the Revision of Laws (Department für Gesetzesrevision) was formed, which also dealt with judicial business of the Rhine Province until 17 December 1838. From 1842 onward the department was again established as a separate and independent ministry (as the Ministry for the Revision of Laws [Ministerium für die Gesetzesrevision]); it was abolished in 1848.

==== Prussian Ministry of Justice for the Administration of Justice or Second Ministry of Justice (1808–1848) ====
Name	Image	Term Start	Term End	Notes	Ref.
(Sovereign) Kingdom of Prussia era (1806–1879) (continued)
Carl Friedrich von Beyme	Carl Friedrich von Beyme	25 November 1808	4 June 1810	Beyme was the first minister of justice with a unified ministry of justice (Chef der Justiz) and the last with the traditional title of Grand Chancellor (Großkanzler). He later became minister of justice again (1817–1819).	
Friedrich Leopold von Kircheisen	Friedrich Leopold von Kircheisen	9 June 1810	18 March 1825	Due to the Regulation of 27 October 1810 "über die veränderte Verfassung aller obersten Staatsbehörden in der Preußischen Monarchie" the role of the minister of justice was restricted quite significantly vis-a-vis the role or the former Grand Chancellor. Kircheisen died in office on 18 March 1825.	
Heinrich von Danckelmann	Heinrich von Danckelmann	23 April 1825	29 December 1830	Danckelmann died in office on 29 December 1830.	
Heinrich Gottlob von Mühler	Heinrich Gottlob von Mühler	9 February 1832	18 August 1844		
Alexander von Uhden	Alexander von Uhden	25 September 1844	20 March 1848		

==== Prussian Ministry of Justice for the Revision of Laws or First Ministry of Justice (1817–1819, 1832–1848) ====
Name	Image	Term Start	Term End	Notes	Ref.
(Sovereign) Kingdom of Prussia era (1806–1879) (continued)
Carl Friedrich von Beyme	Carl Friedrich von Beyme	3 November 1817	31 December 1819	Beyme was the only minister of the First Ministry of Justice for the revision of legislation and for the judicial organisation of the new provinces (Erstes Justizministerium zur Revision der Gesetzgebung und zur Justizorganisation der neuen Provinzen). It was his second term as minister of justice (first term: 1808–1810).	
No Prussian ministry of justice for the revision of legislation existed.
Karl Albert Christoph Heinrich von Kamptz	Karl Albert von Kamptz	9 February 1832	28 February 1842	Kamptz was the only minister of the separate Department für Gesetzesrevision (Department for the Revision of Laws) within the Prussian ministry of justice.	
Friedrich Carl von Savigny	Friedrich Carl von Savigny	28 February 1842	20 March 1848	Savigny headed the reestablished independent Ministry for the Revision of Laws (Ministerium für die Gesetzesrevision) and was its sole minister.	

=== 1848–1935: Prussian Ministry of Justice ===
During the time of the German revolutions of 1848–1849, both ministers of justice (Savigny and Uhden) resigned their portfolios in March 1848 and their ministries were headed by one minister. With a royal decree dated 1 September 1848, the Ministry for the Revision of Laws (Ministerium für die Gesetzesrevision) was formally abolished and its business transferred to the unified Prussian Ministry of Justice.

Name	Image	Term Start	Term End	Notes	Ref.
(Sovereign) Kingdom of Prussia era (1806–1879) (continued)
Friedrich Wilhelm Ludwig Bornemann	Wilhelm Bornemann	20 March 1848	25 June 1848	Minister during the German revolutions of 1848–1849.	
Karl Anton Maerker (Maercker)		25 June 1848	21 September 1848	Minister during the German revolutions of 1848–1849. From 21 September 1848 to 24 September 1848 Undersecretary Müller was acting minister of justice.	
Gustav Wilhelm Kisker		24 September 1848	8 November 1848	Minister during the German revolutions of 1848–1849.	
Wilhelm Rintelen		11 November 1848	10 April 1849	Minister during the German revolutions of 1848–1849.	
Ludwig Simons		10 April 1849	1 December 1860		
August von Bernuth	August von Bernuth	16 December 1860	17 March 1862		
Leopold zur Lippe-Biesterfeld-Weißenfeld		17 March 1862	1 December 1867		
Gerhard Adolph Wilhelm Leonhardt	Adolph Leonhardt	5 December 1867	29 October 1879 [or 30 October 1879]	On 18 January 1871, the German Empire was proclaimed and the Kingdom of Prussia became a state of the Empire.	
German Empire era (1871–1918)
Heinrich von Friedberg		29 October 1879 [or 30 October 1879]	17 January 1889		
Hermann von Schelling	Hermann von Schelling	31 January 1889	14 November 1894		
Karl von Schönstedt		13 November 1894 [or 14 November 1894]	21 November 1905		
Max von Beseler		21 November 1905	5 August 1917		
Peter Spahn	Peter Spahn	6 August 1917	27 November 1918		
Weimar Republic era (1918–1933)
Kurt Rosenfeld	Wahlplakat für Kurt Rosenfeld	27 November 1918 [or 29 November 1918]	3 January 1919	After the end of World War I on 11 November 1918, the German monarchy was abolished and the Kingdom of Prussia became the Free State of Prussia. During the German Revolution of 1918–1919, Rosenfeld was appointed Prussian minister of justice together with Wolfgang Heine.	
Wolfgang Heine	Wolfgang Heine	29 November 1918	25 March 1919	Heine was appointed Prussian minister of justice together with Kurt Rosenfeld. After Rosenfeld's resignation on 3 January 1919, he became the sole Prussian minister of justice until 25 March 1919. Heine could, however, not carry out his official duties and Hugo Heinemann was acting as Prussian minister of justice for him.	
Hugo am Zehnhoff	Hugo am Zehnhoff	25 March 1919	5 March 1927		
Hermann Schmidt	Hermann Schmidt	5 March 1927	29 July 1932	As a result of the Preußenschlag (the 1932 Prussian coup d'état) Paul von Hindenburg replaced the Prussian government of Otto Braun with Franz von Papen on 20 July 1932. Papen acted as Reichskommissar für Preußen (Reich Commissioner for Prussia).	
Heinrich Hölscher		July 1932	23 March 1933	As Reich Commissioner for Prussia, Franz von Papen, appointed Hölscher to head the Prussian ministry of Justice as a Reich Commissioner. On 30 January 1933 Adolf Hitler seized power and the era of Nazi Germany began.	
Nazi Germany era (1933–1935)
Hanns Kerrl	Hanns Kerrl	23 March 1933 [or 29 March 1933]	17 June 1934	As Hölscher before him, Kerrl was at first appointed as Reich Commissioner on 23 [or 29] March 1933. He became an ordinary Prussian minister of justice on 21 April 1934. On 17 June 1934, the Verreichlichung (federalization) of the Prussian justice system started and Kerrl became Reichsminister without Portfolio.	
Franz Gürtner	Franz Gürtner	17 June 1934	31 March 1935	Gürtner held the office only in a caretaker capacity because after the Verreichlichung (federalization) of the Prussian justice system, the administration of justice was transferred to the Reich in 1934 and 1935. On 1 April 1935 the Verreichlichung was completed and the office of Prussian minister of justice abolished.	
