= Johann Schulz =

Johann Schulz may refer to:

- Johann Schulz (sport shooter), (1897–?), German Olympic sport shooter
- Johann Schulz (swimmer), (?–1942), German Olympic swimmer
- Johann Abraham Peter Schulz (1747–1800), German musician
- Johann Heinrich Schulz (1739–1823), German Lutheran pastor
- Johann Philipp Christian Schulz (1773–1827), German composer and conductor
