= General State Laws for the Prussian States =

1792 Prussian legislation

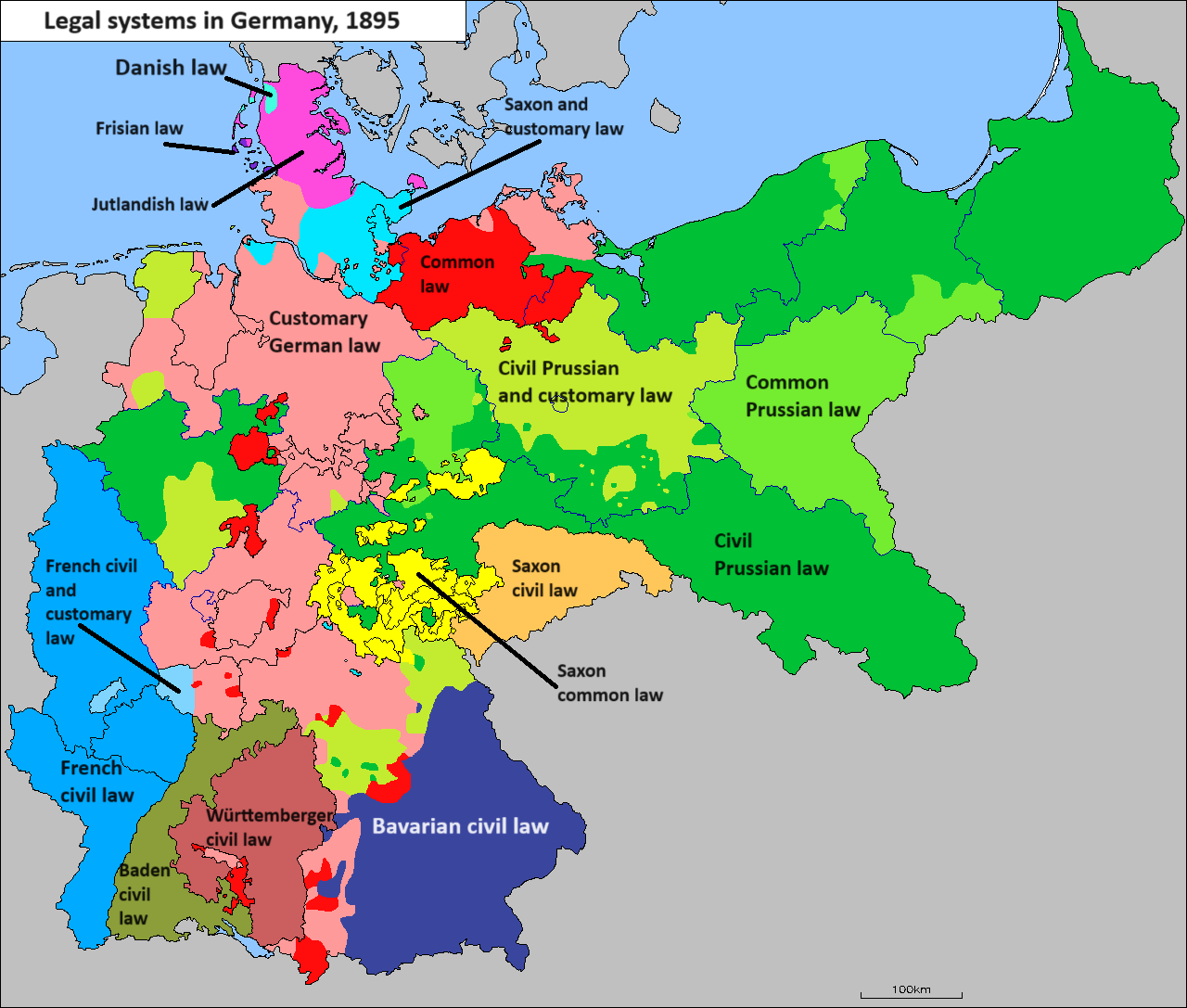
Fields of Law in the German Empire

The General State Laws for the Prussian States (German: Allgemeines Landrecht für die Preußischen Staaten, ALR) were an important code of Prussia, promulgated in 1792 and codified by Carl Gottlieb Svarez and Ernst Ferdinand Klein, under the orders of Frederick II. The code had over 17,000 articles, and covered fields of civil law, penal law, family law, public law, administrative law etc.

== History ==
=== Development ===
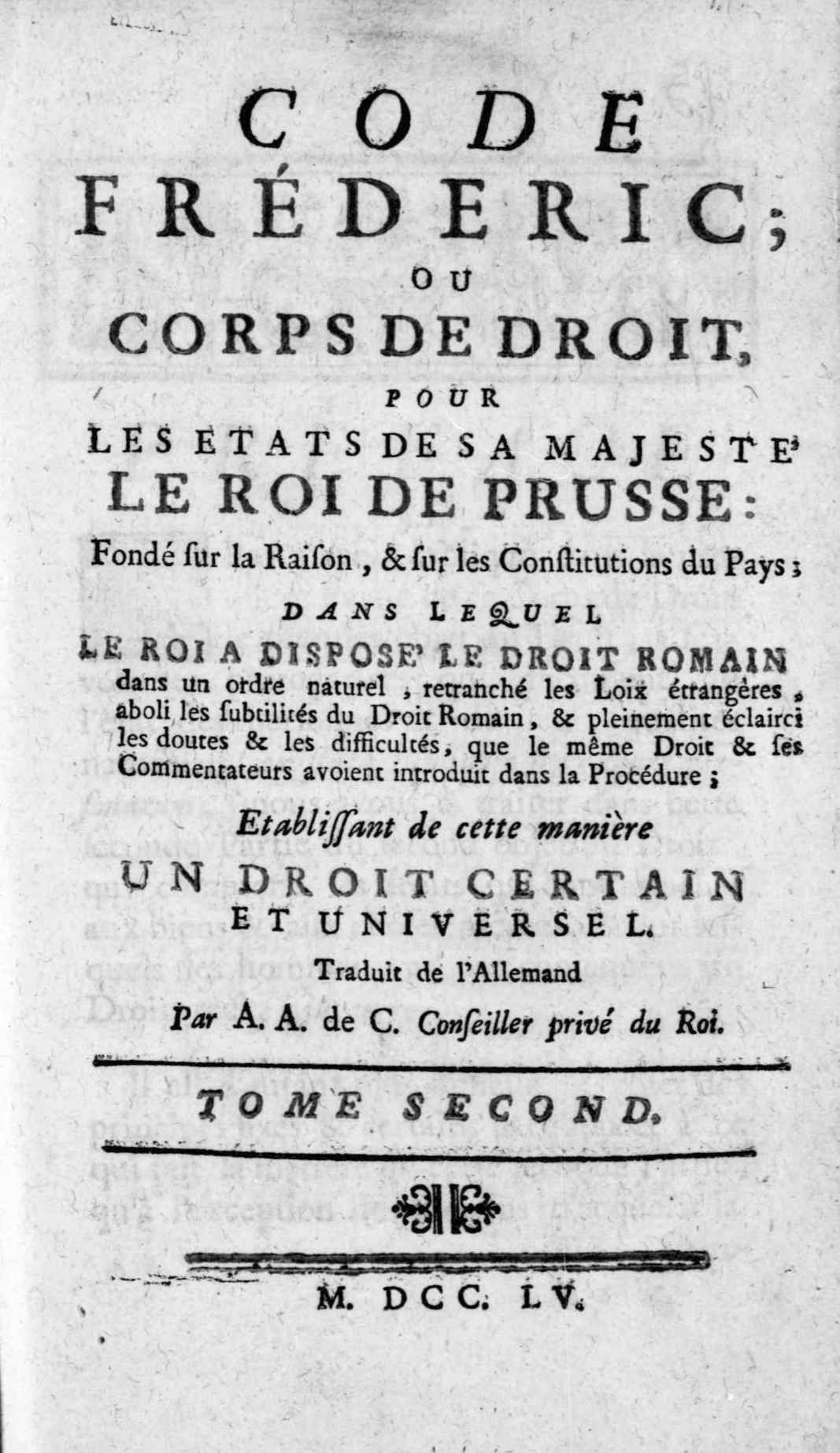
Samuel von Cocceji, Project des Corporis Juris Fridericiani, 1752

Frederick I of Prussia wanted to create a uniform set of laws, but it was not started until the reign of Frederick II. Frederick's idea was not only to create a unified set of laws, but to make them clear and eliminate possible manipulations by different interpretation. A previous attempt, Project eines Corporis Juris Fridericiani (1749–51), by Samuel von Cocceji, proved unsuccessful.

The first version was called the General Code for the Prussian states (German: Allgemeines Gesetzbuch für die Preußischen Staaten, AGB, 1792). Svarez and Klein, who were under the orders of Frederick the Great, presented a project in 1785, but the general state laws for the Prussian states were finally codified in 1794. Frederick had recently overruled his judiciary who had ruled against the millers Arnold in the Miller Arnold case, imprisoning judges who had disobeyed his orders. As a figure keen to maintain his prestige as an Enlightened Absolutist, codification of the laws was a desirable response to his un-Enlightened break of the 'rule of law'.

=== Usage ===
The interpretations of the code's usage are contradictory; some interpret the laws as well known for being simple to read and interpret, without much abstract, being rather an every-day regulating laws, but others point out that while the code was written in German, it used an incredibly casuistic and imprecise language, making it hard to properly understand and use in practice.

After the second partition of Poland, it was promulgated on the annexed territories as subsidiary law, intended to accelerate the process of their integration with Prussia.

The Landrecht was a typical example of a law of the transition period between feudalism and capitalism, where old institutions of feudal law (ordinations, separate property, class divisions, nobility privileges, subjection of peasants) existed alongside modern ones (definition of property).

The Landrecht stopped functioning after the system was reformed (Stein–Hardenberg reforms) and the feudal remnants were removed.
