= Karl Abraham Zedlitz =

Prussian minister (1731–1793)

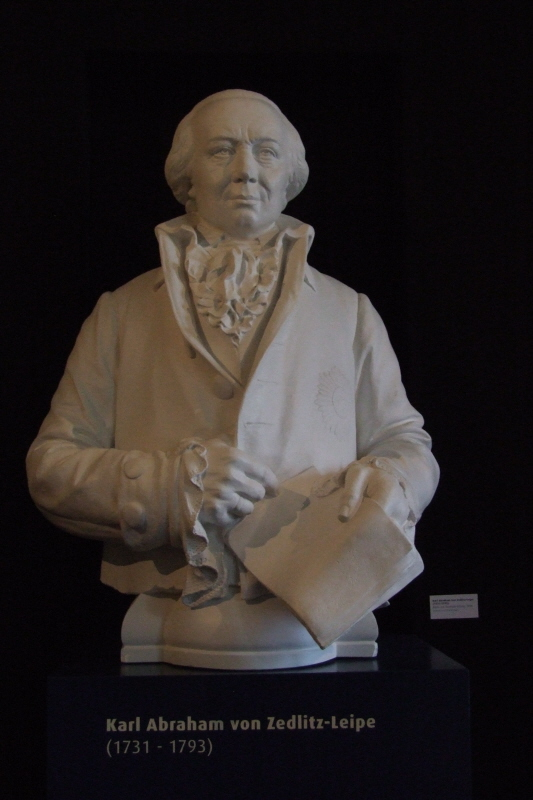
Bust of Karl Abraham Zedlitz at the Schloss Reckahn

Karl Abraham von Zedlitz und Leipe (German: [ˈtseːdlɪts]; 4 January 1731 – 18 March 1793) was a Prussian minister of education who was instrumental in establishing mandatory education in Prussia, which served as a model for the public education system in the United States.

== Biography ==
Zedlitz was born on 4 January 1731 in Schwarzwaldau in the Duchy of Schweidnitz of Habsburg Silesia in the Lands of the Bohemian Crown (now Czarny Bór, Lower Silesian Voivodeship, Poland). After his education at the Military Academy in Brandenburg an der Havel, he took a civil service position as clerk in the Chamber Court in 1755. In 1759 he took a position in the Oberamt Government in Breslau. In 1764 he became the president of the Government of Silesia; in 1770 he became the Secretary of State and Minister of Justice. In 1771 he was in charge of the criminal department, oversaw the entire spiritual department, and was in charge of school supplies. From 18 November 1770 to 18 January 1771, he headed the Prussian Supreme Tribunal – then the fourth senate of the Kammergericht – as its president.

In 1779 he was entangled in Miller Arnold case, a cause célèbre during the reign of Frederick II.

A follower of Immanuel Kant's philosophy, he promoted education and a free spiritual direction for people in the higher schools. Kant's 1781 Critique of Pure Reason opens with a dedication to Zedlitz, keeping with the common eighteenth century practice of dedicating philosophical works to prominent patrons. In 1788, Zedlitz lost the spiritual department when Johann Christoph von Wollner was transferred. Zedlitz resigned from government service. In 1788 and 1789 he was director of the Knight's Academy in Liegnitz. He died on his estate in Kapsdorf.

He died on 18 March 1793 in Kapsdorf in Prussian Silesia (now Czerńczyce).
