= Historic Mill of Sanssouci =

Historic mill in Germany

Coordinates: 52°24′15″N 13°02′08″E

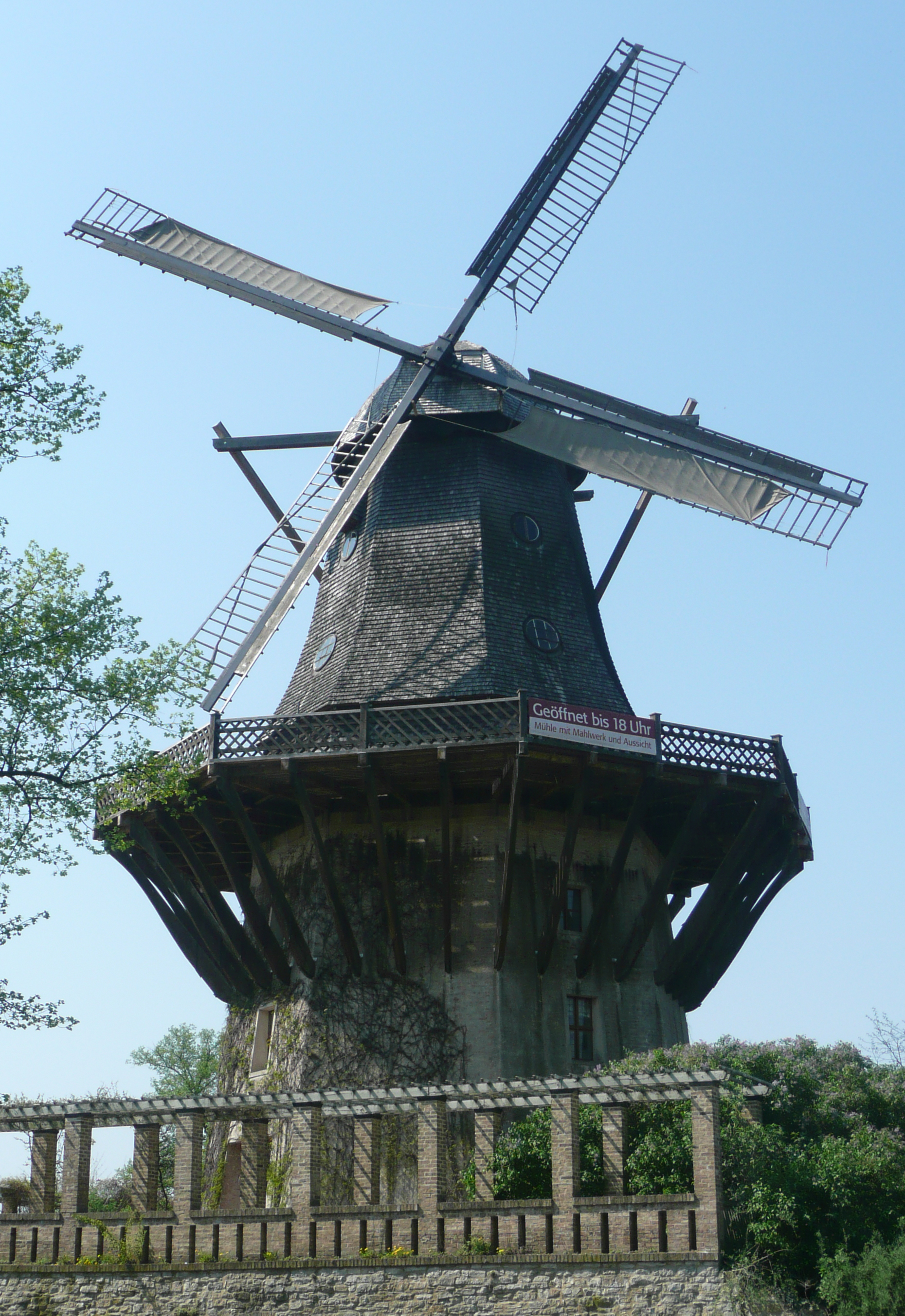
Historic Mill of Sanssouci

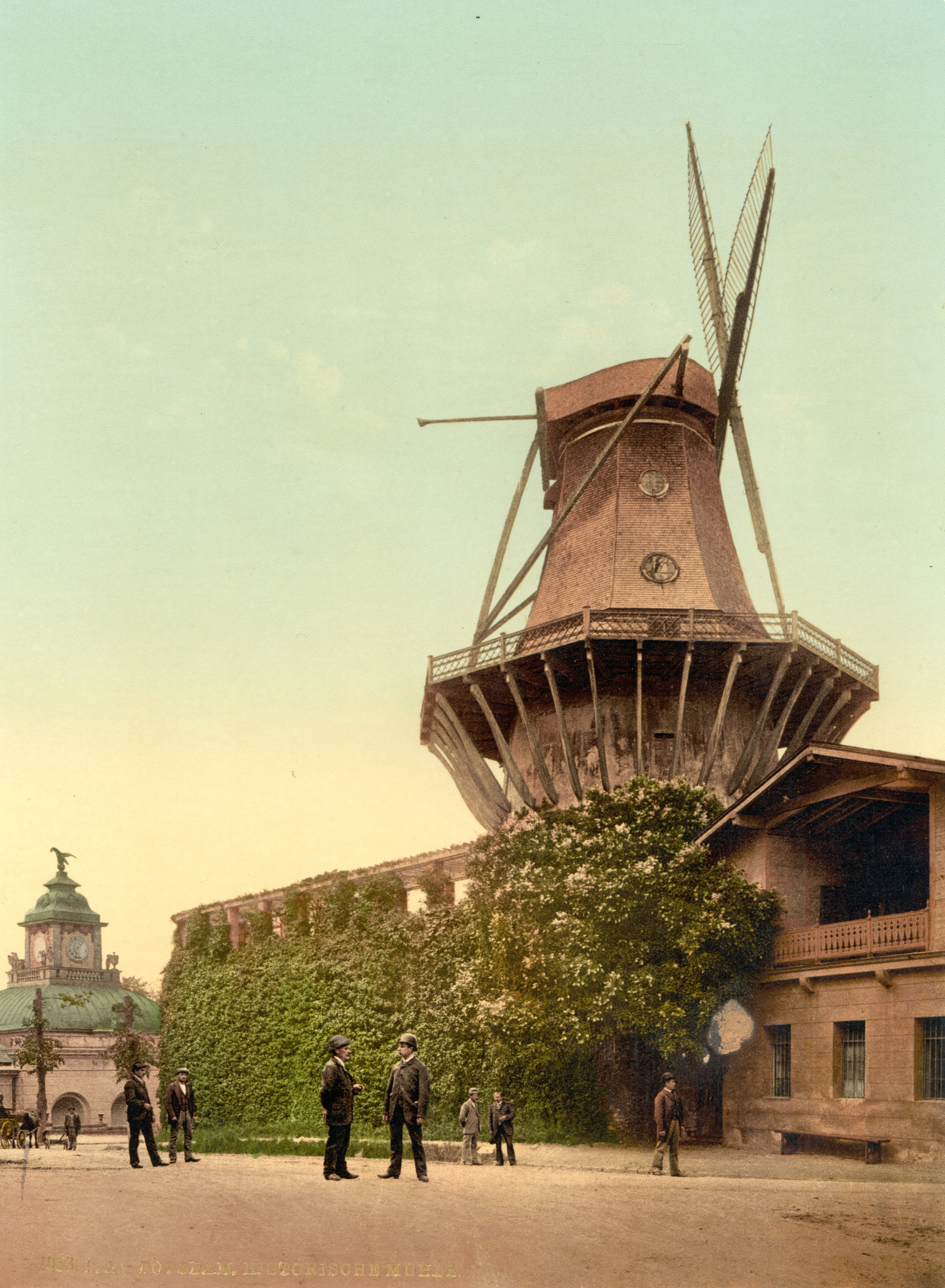
Around 1900

The Historic Mill of Sanssouci is a windmill located in Potsdam, Germany, featured in the legend of The Miller of Sanssouci (German: Der Müller von Sanssouci). It is particularly associated with Frederick the Great and his summer palace of Sanssouci.

== History of the Mill ==
In 1736 the soldier king, Frederick William I of Prussia, gave permission for the construction of a windmill, which was started in 1737. This first windmill, completed in 1738, was a post mill, whose entire superstructure, supported on a wooden post, was turned "into the wind" depending on the wind direction. The first mill and actual Historic Mill was thus older than the nearby summer palace, built in the years 1745 to 1747 for Frederick the Great.

A half-century later the, by now dilapidated, post mill had to be demolished. The construction of a new mill, between 1787 and 1791, was financed by Frederick William II, because the mill had become famous far beyond the city of Potsdam as the result of a legend. The task was given to the master builder, Cornelius Wilhelm van der Bosch, who erected a bigger smock mill based on the Dutch prototype in place of the post mill.

Following the accession of Frederick William IV in 1840, the landscape architect, Peter Joseph Lenné, smartened up the area around the mill. In connexion with this, a triumphal way was planned by the king, in honour of Frederick the Great, but it was only partially realised. It was intended to incorporate the Historic Mill into this project as the road was to run from the Gate of Triumph, east of Sanssouci Park, and run past the newly built Orangery Palace to the Belvedere on the Klausberg. The March Revolution of 1848 and a lack of finance, however, meant that this grand project came to nothing.

In 1858 the last miller finished his tenancy. Because the king refused to allow other applicants to run the mill, the building became open to visitors in 1861.

At the end of the Second World War, on 27 April 1945, a Soviet tank was hit by a panzerfaust between the mill and the drive up to Sanssouci Palace. In the battle that followed the mill and the Swiss house at its foot were set ablaze. Both buildings were destroyed, but the Swiss house (Schweizerhaus) was not rebuilt.

== Reconstruction of the Historic Mill ==
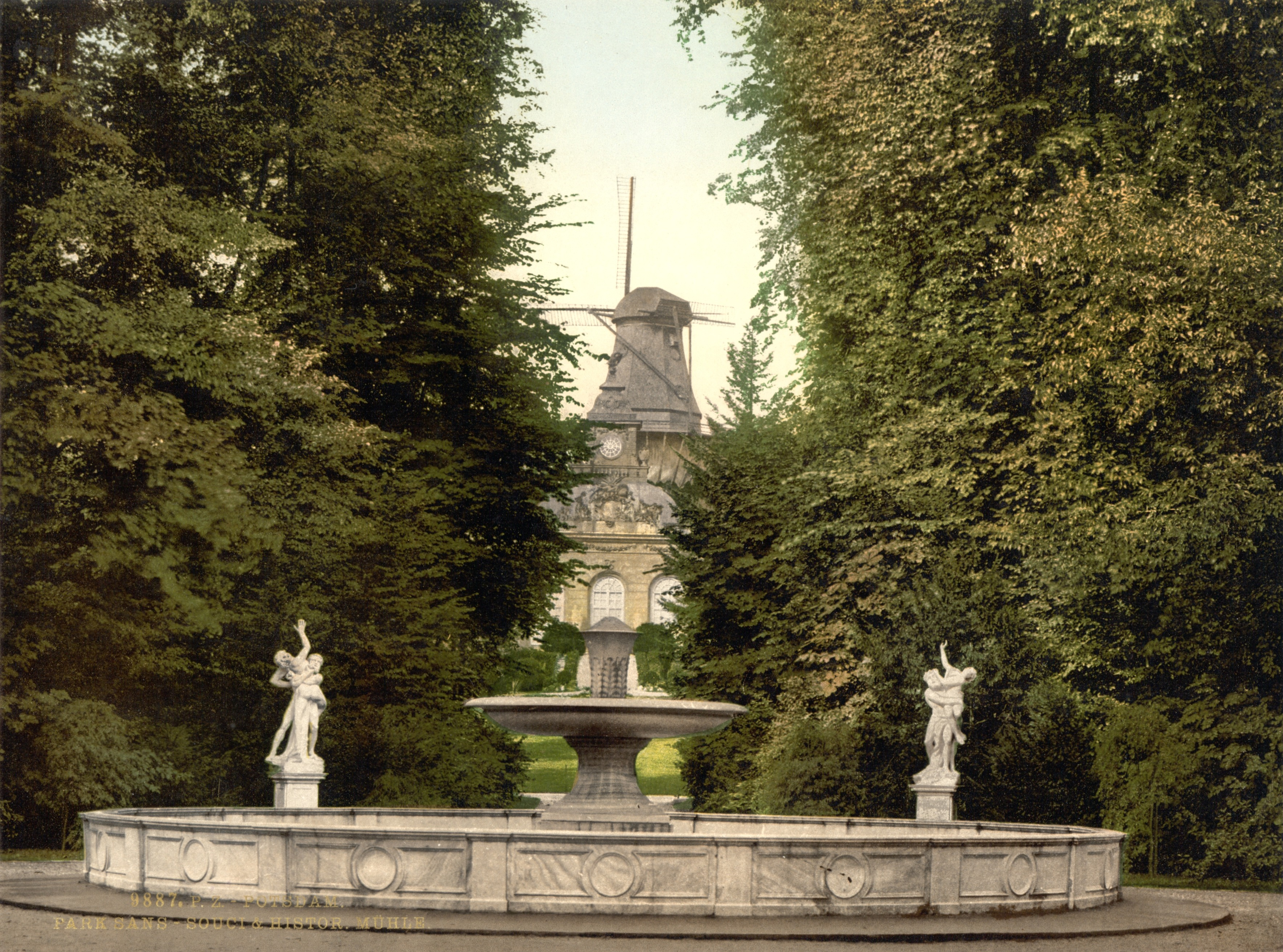
The mill around 1900

In 1983 the Potsdam Chamber of Commerce began the restoration of the stone base. This work had to be stopped in 1990 due to financial difficulties. At the end of 1991, the rebuilding work was able to start again thanks to donations from the state of Brandenburg, the North Rhine-Westphalia Foundation and the then Potsdam-Sanssouci Foundation of Prussian Palaces and Gardens.

The present smock mill is a replica of the one built from 1787 to 1791 and the third so-called Historic Mill. It had to be planned from photographs and measurements of the mill foundations, because the construction drawings by Cornelius Wilhelm van der Bosch were no longer available.

The mill is owned by the Berlin-Brandenburg Foundation for Prussian Palaces and Gardens (Stiftung Preußische Schlösser and Gärten Berlin-Brandenburg). It has been operated since 1995 by the Berlin-Brandenburg Mill Association, founded in 1990.

Since 1984 a replica of the Historic Mill of Sanssouci in Potsdam has stood in the open land of the Gifhorn Mill Museum.

== Technical data ==
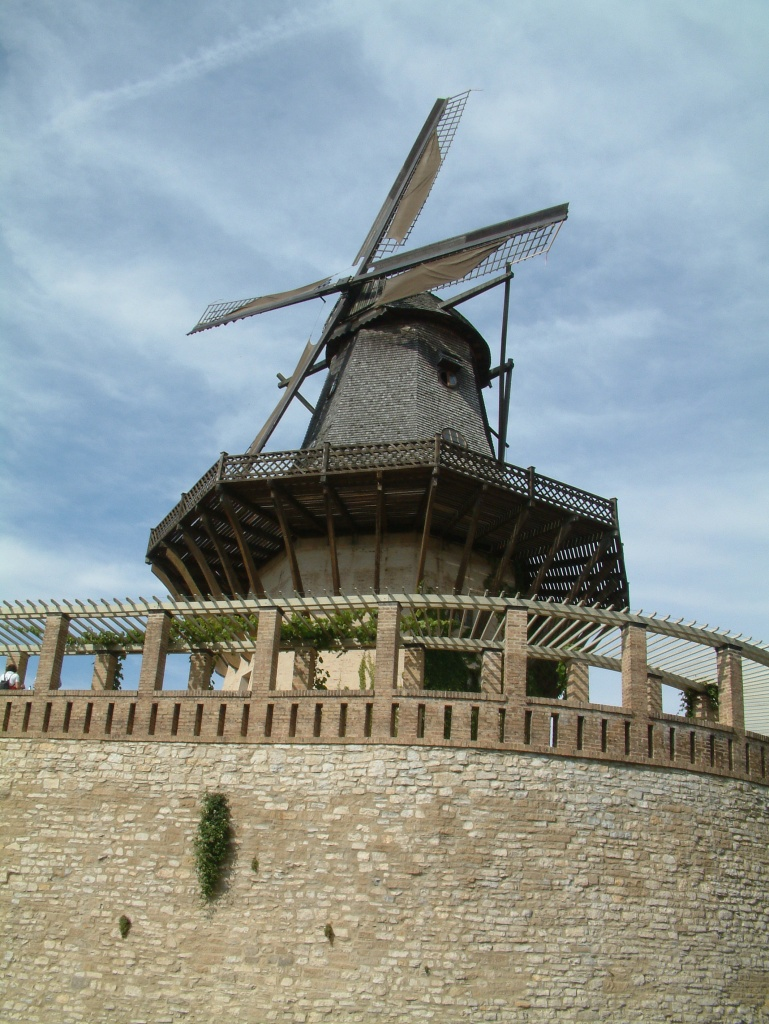
Historic Mill – view from below

The design reflects construction methods around the year 1800, its technical equipment in part that of the turn of the 19th century.

Mill design: Octagonal post, mill cap, mill technical features like the 5.5 metre long sail axle.

The mill has a height of 25.78 metres and, up to the upper edge of the sail, 35.45 metres. Breakdown:

- Stone pedestal: 13.41 metres.
- Wooden smock: 12.37 metres.
- Length of the rods (Segelgatterflügel): each 12 metres.

== Legend ==
As recorded by historian Franz Theodor Kugler in 1856, the legend goes that Frederick the Great was being disturbed by the clatter of the mill sails and offered to buy the mill from its miller, Johann William Grävenitz. When he refused, the king is supposed to have threatened:

"Does he not know that I can take the mill away from him by virtue of my royal power without paying one groschen for it?"

Whereupon the miller is supposed to have replied:

"Of course, your majesty, your majesty could easily do that, if – begging your pardon – it were not for the Supreme Court in Berlin."

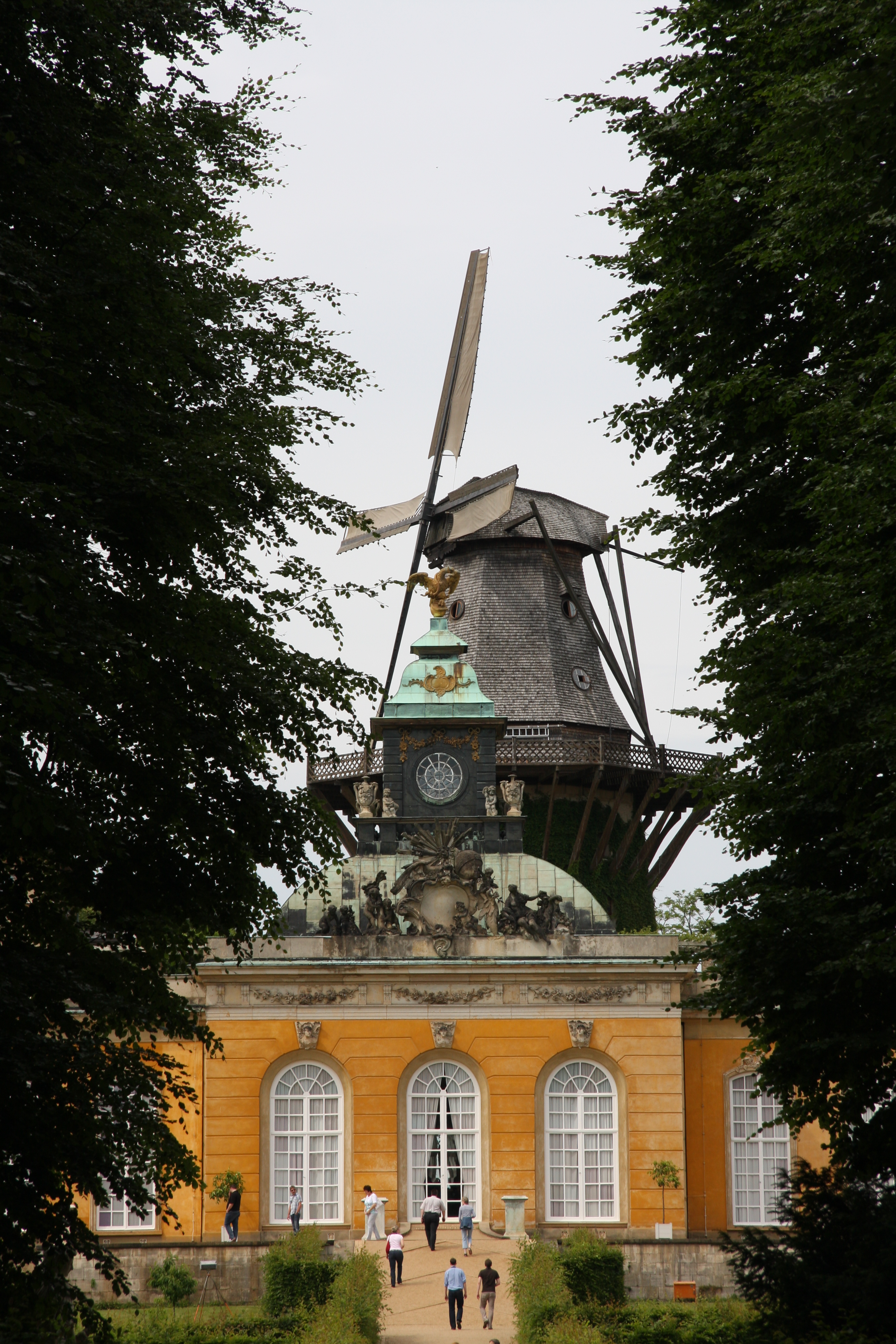
The mill in June 2009

This is only a legend. According to Frederick the Great the mill underscored the rural character of his summer palace and said "that, ... the mill is an ornament for the palace." The miller was reportedly a difficult man, who cheated the local farmers over their flour and constantly pestered the king with petitions. At least one of these petitions was heard by Frederick II. Grävenitz pointed to the fact that, as a result of the construction of the palace, the post mill no longer stood in the open, but was partly shielded from the wind. So he demanded that the king let him build the mill in another site and to pay him for it. Frederick II acceded to this, with the result that, shortly thereafter, the wily Grävenitz was the proud possessor of two mills thanks to the king's grace, until he eventually resold the old mill.

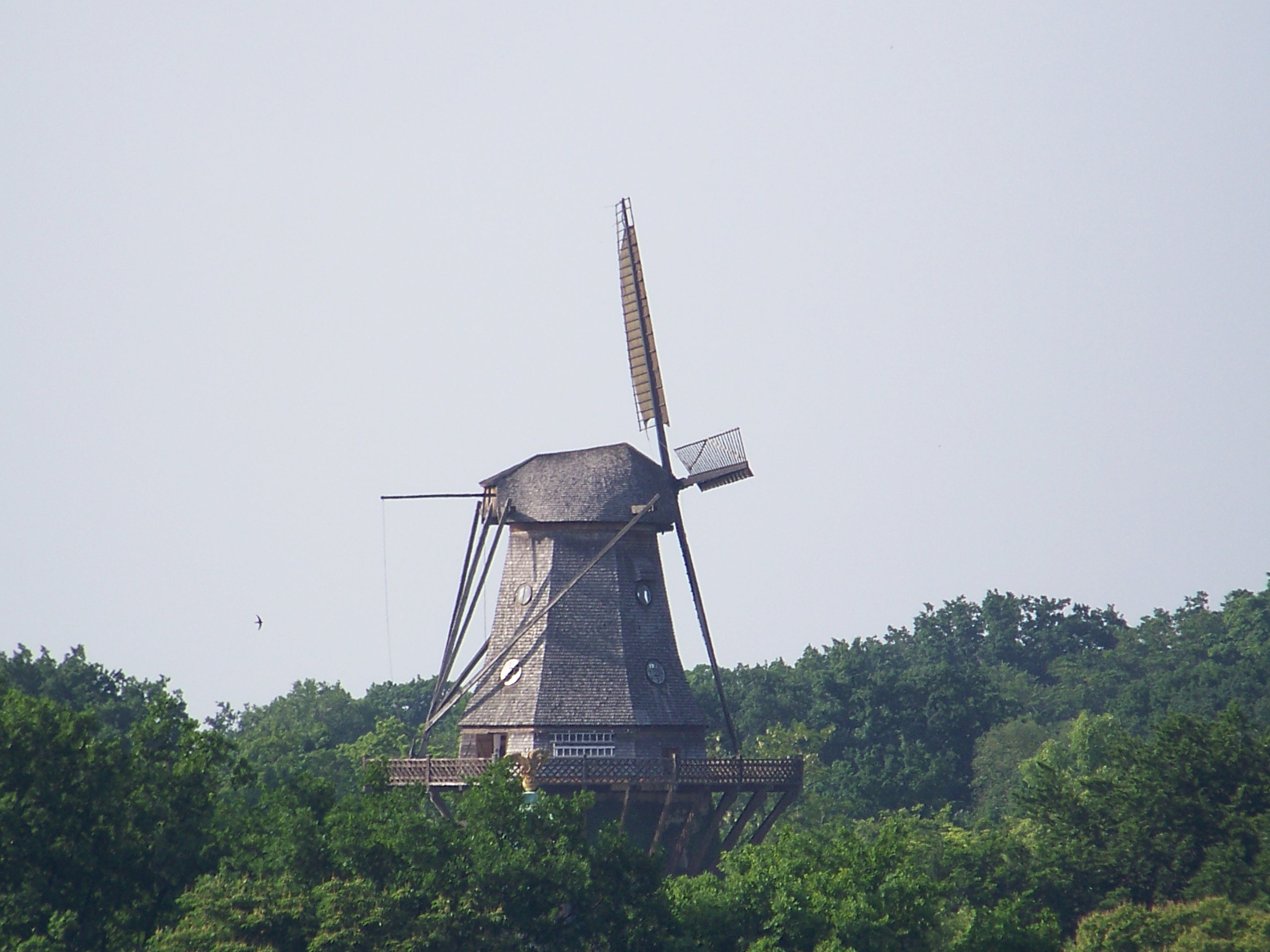
View from the Erlöser Church

In 1768 there was a legal dispute at another location over water rights and the remaining lease between Christian Arnold, the tenant of a mill in Pommerzig in the Neumark, and his landlord, the Count of Schmettau. After the miller was found guilty on two accounts, he appealed to Frederick the Great, who intervened in the ongoing proceedings in favour of the miller. Wrongly, as it turned out later. The king referred the case to the Berlin Court of Appeal, who once again ruled against the miller. Frederick the Great, then demanded a condemnation of the judges and their imprisonment in Spandau Citadel for their unjust judgments and thus precipitated an abuse of his name.

This legal battle and the story of the Sanssouci miller were woven together in the legend and were intended to emphasize the king's justice towards all his subjects. After the death of Frederick the Great, the case was reopened. His nephew and successor, Frederick William II decided in a compromise that:

"... the Miller Arnold case ... should be viewed as the consequence of a mistake, whereby the praiseworthy judicial zeal of our royal uncle, who rests in God, was misled by incomplete, inadequate reporting of the true situation by badly informed and preoccupied [biased] people."

In the years that followed there continued to be disputes between the reigning kings and the millers for different reasons.

After the death of Frederick II, the legend was first mentioned in the publication Vie de Frederic II, Roi de Prusse (The Life of Frederick II, King of Prussia) by Jean-Charles Laveaux (1749-1827), published in France in 1787. In it he formulates the miller's threat with the words: "Oui, [...] n'était la chambre de justice de Berlin" ("Yes, [...] if we didn't have the Supreme Court in Berlin"). This was followed by different versions of this legend in both France and Germany. Among others, a shortened version appeared in 1788 in the work About Friedrich the Great and my discussions with him shortly before his death by the doctor Johann Georg Zimmermann and in 1797 the story Le Meunier de Sans-Souci written in verse by the lawyer and playwright François Andrieux. The answer given by the miller: "Oui! si nous n'avions pas des juges à Berlin" ("Yes! If we do not have judges in Berlin"), became the saying: "Il ya des juges à Berlin" ("There are [still] judges in Berlin"). In 1798 the comedy Le moulin de Sans-Souci by the French playwright Michel Dieulafoy (1762-1823) followed. In Germany, Johann Peter took further the legend in 1811 in his Treasure Chest of the Rhenish House Friend and reproduced it in a modified form under the title King Friedrich and his neighbor. The Miller of Sanssouci can be found in several publications to this day, was filmed and performed as a play, such as the comic opera by Karl Goepfart (1907) and the comedy by Peter Hacks (1958).

== See also ==
- Windmill
- Gifhorn Mill Museum
- Miller Arnold case

== Literature ==
- Amtlicher Führer der Stiftung Preußische Schlösser and Gärten Berlin Brandenburg: Die Historic Mill. 1. Auflage. Potsdam 2000
