= Johann Heinrich von Carmer =

Prussian judicial reformer

Johann Heinrich Casimir, Baron von Carmer
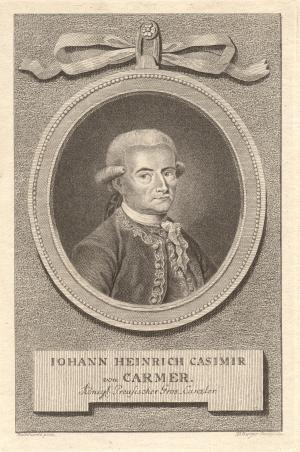
- Born: 29 December 1720; Kreuznach
- Died: 23 May 1801 (aged 80); Rützen, Silesia
- Occupation: Jurist
- Years active: 1760–1795
- Notable work: Corpus Juris Fridericianum

Johann Heinrich Casimir, Baron von Carmer (29 December 1720 in Kreuznach–23 May 1801 in Rützen, Silesia) was a Prussian judicial reformer. He was instrumental in the Miller Arnold case, which is an example of the principle of the independence of the judiciary. He was instrumental in the creation of Corpus Juris Fridericianum for Frederick the Great, adopted into law in 1794. For his achievements in the unification and modernization of Prussian law he was awarded the Black Eagle Order by King Frederick William II on 18 January 1788, and he was included among the names inscribed on the Equestrian statue of Frederick the Great in 1851.

== Career ==
Carmer studied law at the universities of Jena and Halle. In 1749, he worked at the Reichskammergericht (Imperial Chamber Court). In 1751, Grand Chancellor Samuel Freiherr von Coccji appointed him to the Council of Governors in Opole. Later, he became the director, then the head of the government in Breslau; 1751 Director (und 1763 President) of the Upper Chamber of Breslau. In 1768, he became president of all the governing ministries in Silesia, and he was awarded the title of Silesian Minister of Justice. From this position, he was in contact with Frederick on questions of the reform of the judiciary and the law of procedure. Frederick had great concerns about the state of justice in Prussia, understanding that it was not as up-to-date as it should be, but these were passed to the de jure chancellor-prince. The whole situation came to a head in 1778 with the Miller-Arnold Affair.

=== Miller Arnold Affair ===
The miller Arnold from the Oderbruch operated a water mill on a tributary flowing to the Oder. He was a hereditary tenant, and owed his tenancy fees on the mill to one Count Erbett. One day, however, the district council of nearby Gersdorff, which also held land abutting the river, built a carp pond. The river held only very little water, enough to run the mill, but once the Gersdorff council created the pond, the flow decreased to trickle. The miller maintained that he could not continue his business and thus could not pay fees to his master. The case went to court; Count von Schmettau made a judgment of the Patrimonial Court against the Miller in 1773. The latter now turned to the appeals court in Küstrin, which, however, confirmed Schmettau's verdict. In 1778, the mill was forcibly confiscated, and von Schmettau acquired it. The outraged miller wrote to King Frederick, who ordered an investigation.

Frederick's investigators reported back and the king was appalled by what he learned. He wrote in summary of the Miller's case, that the judiciary was:

...acting in self-interest, and [a judicial college] which practices injustices, is more dangerous and worse, such as a gang of thieves, [from which] one can protect oneself, but no one can guard against those who use the mantle of justice to carry out their evil passions. They are worse than the greatest rascals in the world, and merit a double punishment.

Frederick demanded the arrest of the chamber judge, and the Grand Chancellor Karl Abraham von Zedlitz refused. He was relieved of his duties and a new Grand Chancellor, Maximilian von Fürst und Kupferberg appointed; when he refused to arrest the recalcitrant judge from the original case, he also was dismissed by Frederick. In 1779, the King made Carmer Maximilian's successor. Frederick realized that he needed to reshape the Prussian justice system, which was riddled with corruption, delay, and medieval punishments that were irrational and counterproductive.

=== Reshaping Prussian law ===
As Grand Chancellor, Carmer, Samuel von Cocceji, and another jurist, Carl Gottlieb Svarez, considered among the best legal minds of the age, developed extensive reforms in Prussian justice, despite resistance in the Berlin judiciary circles. While Frederick promoted careful adaptations and cautious reforms, Carmer, with his energetic nature, in the spirit of the King's wishes, implemented a more comprehensive reform and promised the monarch a remedy. As Chancellor and First Minister of the Justice Department, he was able to implement his ideas. In a memorandum of 14 April 1780, he laid out the fundamental principles of a reform of the whole of the entire system of law, especially of the procedural law. In the execution of this order, Carmer and his co-workers created the Corpus Juris Fridericianum, which replaced the General Land Law for the Prussian States; Frederick had died in the meantime (1786), but his heir, Frederick William II, pushed for its completion and adopted it in 1794. Carmer not only wrote parts of these laws himself, but also provided the necessary support for the projects established by the King and for their defense against any entrenched judicial resistance. For his achievements in the unification and modernization of Prussian law he was awarded the Black Eagle Order by King Frederick William II on 18 January 1788. In 1851, Frederick William IV included Carmer's name, and that of Cocceji, in the inscriptions on the Equestrian statue of Frederick the Great as among the founders of the modern Prussian state.
