= Johann Heinrich Schulz =

German Lutheran pastor

Johann Heinrich Schulz (1739–1823) was a German Lutheran pastor.

== Life ==
From 1758 to 1761 Schulz studied in Halle (Saale) and later became a teacher in Berlin. In 1765 he was appointed preacher by the local landlords in Gielsdorf, Wilke, and Hirschfelde villages where he remained active for 26 years. For health reasons he refused to wear a peruke at the pulpit during sermons, which earned him the nickname "Zopfschulze" (Pigtail Schulz).

He published books anonymously, including Versuch einer Anleitung zum Sittenlehre (1783), but authorship was, nevertheless, no secret, and he was well known in Berlin's intellectual circles.

== Trial ==
In 1791 he was suspended from office for violating the Religious Edict of King Frederick William II. At the Berlin Court of Appeal, however, summoned on 21 May 1792, it was decided that Schulz should not remain as a Lutheran, but as a spiritual preacher in office. On the very day of the decision, Frederik William II ordered Schulz's dismissal. The king had to announce the names of the judges who voted for Schulz and let them impose on penalties in the form of loss of benefits, which were repealed later. This interference with judicial independence is viewed as a step backwards compared to the progressive development since the Miller Arnold case in 1779.

In 1798 Frederick William III allowed a review of the trial, which confirmed the earlier decision that Schulz had been in violation of the Religious Edict. The king secured Schulz a job in the civil service, where he served as inspector in the Royal Factory Department, and, according to other sources, as tableware clerk at a porcelain factory in Berlin. Schulz kept this job until his forced retirement in 1808.

He died in 1823.

== Bibliography ==
- Sauter, Michael J. "Preaching, a Ponytail, and an Enthusiast: Rethinking the Public Sphere's Subversiveness in Eighteenth-Century Prussia." Central European History 37.4 (2004): 544-567.
- Thomas P. Saine, The Problem of Being Modern, or the German Pursuit of Enlightenment from Leibniz to the French Revolution (Detroit, MI: Wayne University Press, 1997)
- Gustav Frank, "Schulz, Johann Heinrich", Allgemeine Deutsche Biographie (ADB), vol. 23 (Leipzig: Duncker & Humblot, Leipzig 1891), p. 745–747. (in German)
- Johannes Tradt, Der Religionsprozeß gegen den Zopfschulzen (1791-1799): Ein Beitrag zur protestantischen Lehrpflicht und Lehrzucht in Brandenburg-Preußen gegen Ende des 18. Jahrhunderts (Frankfurt: Peter Lang, 1997) ISBN 978-3-631-30866-0 (in German)
- Leopold Volkmar Religions-Prozess des Prediger Schulz zu Gielsdorf genannt Zopfschulz, eines Lichtfreundes des 18. Jahrhunderts (Leipzig: Philipp Reclam Jr., 1846)
