= Czerńczyce, Wrocław County =

Czerńczyce
- Village
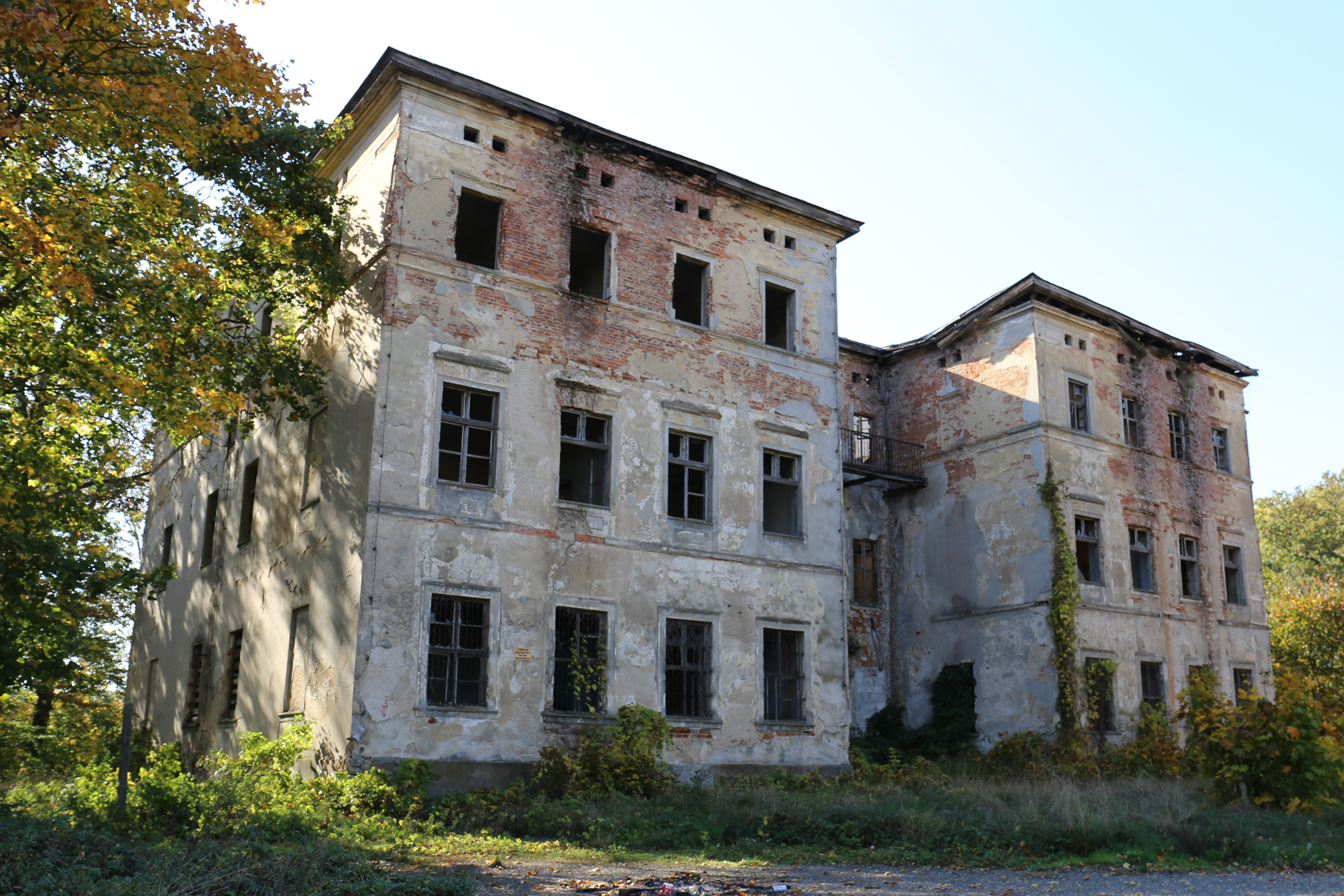
- Ruins of the palace in 2018

- Location within Poland
- Coordinates: 50°58′18″N 16°45′32″E
- Country: Poland
- Voivodeship: Lower Silesian
- County: Wrocław
- Gmina: Kąty Wrocławskie

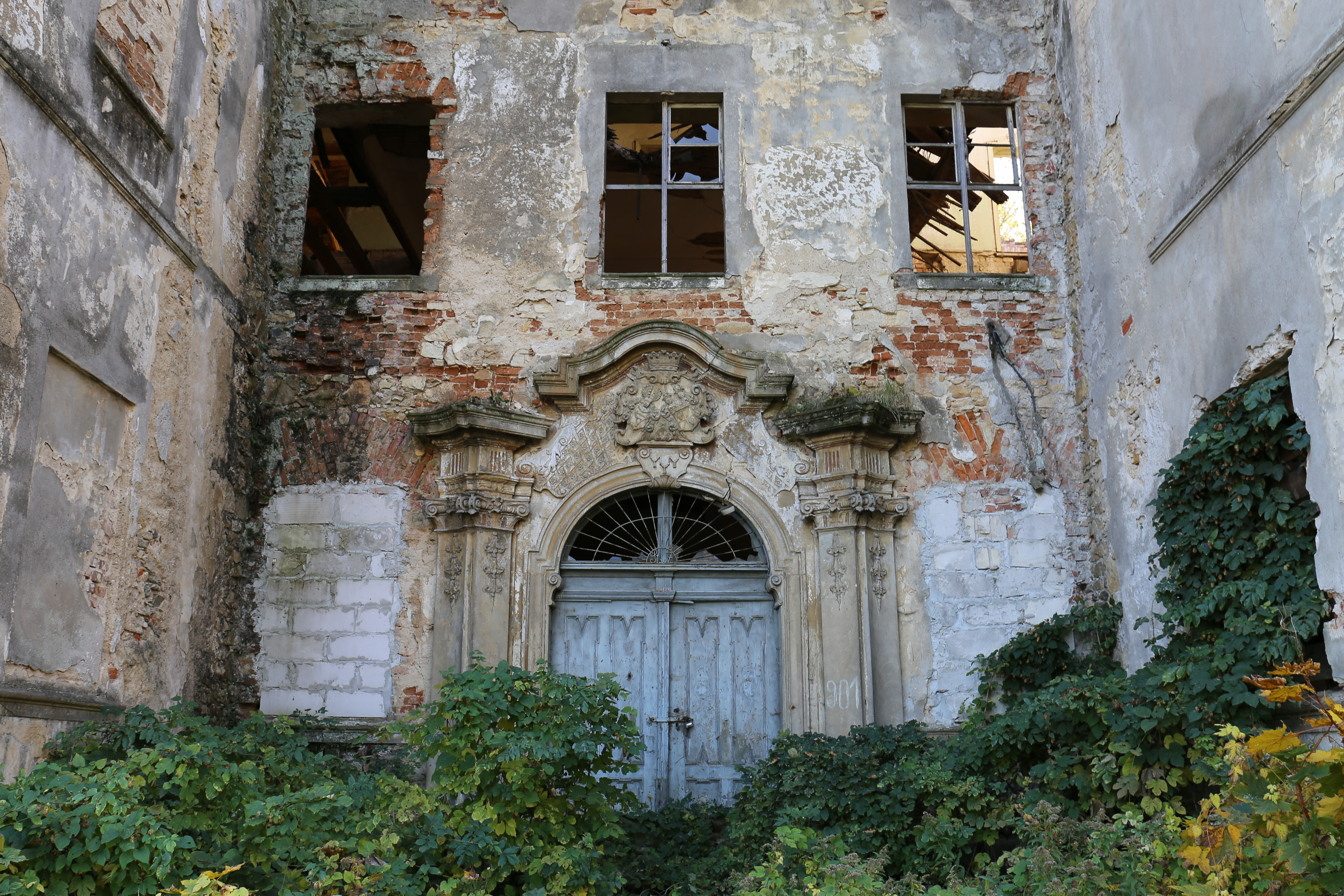
Ruins of the palace (2018)

Czerńczyce [t͡ʂɛrɲˈt͡ʂɨt͡sɛ] is a village in the administrative district of Gmina Kąty Wrocławskie, within Wrocław County, Lower Silesian Voivodeship, in south-western Poland.
