= Miller Arnold case =

1762–1780 German court case and cause célèbre

1780 engraving by Vincenzio Vangelisti depicting Frederick's interventions in the case

The Miller Arnold case (German: Müller-Arnold-Fall) is a landmark 18th-century German court case and cause célèbre during the reign of Frederick II that raised issues relating to the concept of judicial independence. It is an example of the Kabinettsjustiz (transl. cabinet justice) of Frederick II, as he personally intervened in a case which had already been adjudicated by the Prussian courts.

The case is named after the miller Christian Arnold who, together with his wife Rosine, pursued justice for an alleged upstream diversion of the water supply to his mill by a nobleman that rendered the mill inoperable. They lost all court cases that considered the matter, but when the couple turned to Frederick II, the king inter alia quashed the decisions of the Prussian courts, imprisoned some of the deciding judges, dismissed Maximilian von Fürst und Kupferberg, a leading figure in the administration of justice, and restored the mill and its water supply to the Arnolds.

After Frederick's death, Frederick William II reversed the punitive measures taken against the judges, rehabilitated them, restored them to office, and ordered reimbursement of the sums they had been required to pay.

== Case background ==
The water miller Christian Arnold operated a water-powered grain mill (the Krebsmühle) near Pommerzig in the Oderbruch, in what is now Pomorsko, Zielona Góra County, Lubusz Voivodeship, in western Poland. The grain mill was located on a body of water flowing to the Oder and was under heritable leasehold (Erbpacht). Christian Arnold had purchased the water mill in 1762 from his father Hans in exchange for 300 taler and a retirement provision. It was part of an estate of Gottfried Heinrich Leopold von Schmettau, a member of the noble von Schmettau family. Under the original leasehold contract of 1710, Arnold and his wife, Rosine, owed an annual payment of three Malter of grain and 10 taler to their landlord von Schmettau.

Next door to the estate of von Schmettau was the estate of Georg Samuel Wilhelm von Gersdorf – the district administrator of Züllichau County (Landkreis Züllichau-Schwiebus). Christian and Rosine Arnold claimed that von Gersdorf had diverted water upstream since 1770 to supply his three new carp ponds with water. According to the Arnolds, this had rendered their grain mill almost unusable, especially during the summer months, and had thereby threatened their livelihood. To address the issue, they suspended their lease payments to their landlord von Schmettau.

== Court proceedings ==
=== Patrimonial court proceedings ===
The matter lingered until 1773, when von Schmettau sued Christian and Rosine Arnold in his patrimonial court for back payment of the lease payments. In this court he himself had the Gerichtsherrschaft (transl. landlord's right to hold court). In June 1773, the court – assessor Johann Friedrich Schlecker (the Justitiarius of von Schmettau) – upheld the action and instructed the Arnolds to pay up or face expulsion. When the Arnolds refused to pay, the patrimonial court in 1774 temporarily seized their five milk cows and imprisoned Christian Arnold twice, for seven and three weeks respectively.

In September 1778, the patrimonial court foreclosed on the water mill and auctioned it for 600 taler. According to historian David M. Luebke, the benefactor of this action was a front man. This person resold the grain mill to Georg Samuel Wilhelm von Gersdorf, the nobleman, who, according to the Arnolds, had originally caused the issue by diverting the water supply upstream. In February 1779, von Gersdorf resold the water mill for a profit of 200 taler to "Widow Poelchen", who – according to David M. Luebke – was "in all likelihood [...] Christian Arnold's sister, Anna Maria."

=== Neumark provincial court proceedings ===
Parallel to the proceedings before the patrimonial court, the Arnolds filed suit against von Schmettau on 7 March 1774 before the Neumark provincial court (the Neumärkische Regierung) in Küstrin. They petitioned that court for the suspension of their lease payments until the water supply was restored. After some deliberations, the Neumark provincial court dismissed the suit on 22 January 1776 and ruled for von Schmettau. The court reasoned that even if the Arnolds could sue von Schmettau at all, he could not be held responsible for the conduct of von Gersdorf.

The Arnolds then proceeded to sue von Gersdorf in the same court for diverting the water. The court heard the claim on royal order, but dismissed that suit as well on 28 October 1779 after finding for von Gersdorf.

=== Kammergericht proceedings ===
The Arnolds appealed against the 1776 Neumark provincial court's ruling in favour of von Schmettau. They brought the appeal in the Kammergericht, at that time the supreme appellate court for provinces in the Margraviate of Brandenburg. The appellate court, however, dismissed the appeal on 18 September 1776.

Frederick II then ordered that the 1779 ruling for von Gersdorf also be heard by the Kammergericht, but the Kammergericht again upheld the lower court's decision. This decision of the Kammergericht has been published.

== Involvement of the king ==
=== Petitions to the king ===
Parallel to the court proceedings the Arnolds pleaded their case to the king. From 1775 they sent petitions directly to Frederick II pleading for a royal commission to investigate the matter. Historian David M. Luebke argues that these petitions convinced the king by 1779 that the Arnolds' cause was well founded. Christian Arnold was granted an audience in Potsdam by the king on 21 August 1779 and on the day after an investigatory commission was set up. The king's appointment of the commission has been published.

=== Investigatory commission ===
The investigatory commission consisted of von Heucking (or von Heyking) (Oberst), a military man, and Johann Ernst Neumann (Regierungsrat), a member of the Neumark provincial court. As von Heucking and Neumann could not agree on a report, they produced two very different ones: von Heucking found for the Arnolds, while Neumann agreed with the decisions of the courts. Based on von Heucking's findings, Frederick II became firmly convinced that the Arnolds' case was well-founded.

=== Interventions by the king ===
==== Sacking of von Fürst ====
On 11 December 1779 Frederick II summoned Maximilian von Fürst und Kupferberg – the Grosskanzler, a leading figure in the Prussian administration of justice – and the judges of the Kammergericht that had dismissed the last appeal (judges Friedel, Gaun and Ransleben) to Berlin. At his palace, he scolded the judges and reversed their decision, stating that they had cruelly abused his name ("cruel gemisbraucht") by issuing an unjust decision under it. As von Fürst tried to intervene, Frederick II sacked him – his successor as Grosskanzler being Johann Heinrich von Carmer – with the famous bonmot:

Marsch! Seine Stelle ist schon vergeben!

March! Your post has already been given to someone else!

— Frederick the Great

The king gave the reasons for his intervention in a protocol dated 11 December 1779 that was to be printed in the newspapers:

Darnach mögen sich die Justiz-Collegia in allen Provinzen nur zu richten haben, und wo sie nicht mit der Justiz ohne alles Ansehen der Person und des Standes gerade durch gehen, sondern die natürliche Billigkeit bei Seite setzen, so sollen sie es mit Sr. Königl. M. zu thun kriegen. Denn ein Justiz-Collegium, das Ungerechtigkeiten ausübt, ist gefährlicher und schlimmer, wie eine Diebesbande, vor der kann man sich schützen, aber vor Schelmen, die den Mantel der Justiz gebrauchen, um ihre üblen Passiones auszuführen, vor die kann sich kein Mensch hüten. Die sind ärger als die größten Spitzbuben, die in der Welt sind, und meritiren eine doppelte Bestrafung.

The judicial colleges in all provinces may only be guided by this, and if they do not go straight through with justice without regard to person and rank, but set aside natural equity, they shall have to deal with HRH. For a judicial college that practices injustice is more dangerous and worse than a gang of thieves, from whom one can protect oneself, but from rogues who use the cloak of justice to carry out their evil passions, from these no man can beware. They are worse than the biggest scoundrels in the world and deserve a double punishment.

— Frederick II

==== Imprisonments and criminal proceedings against the deciding judges ====
The last decision by Frederick II dated 1 January 1780
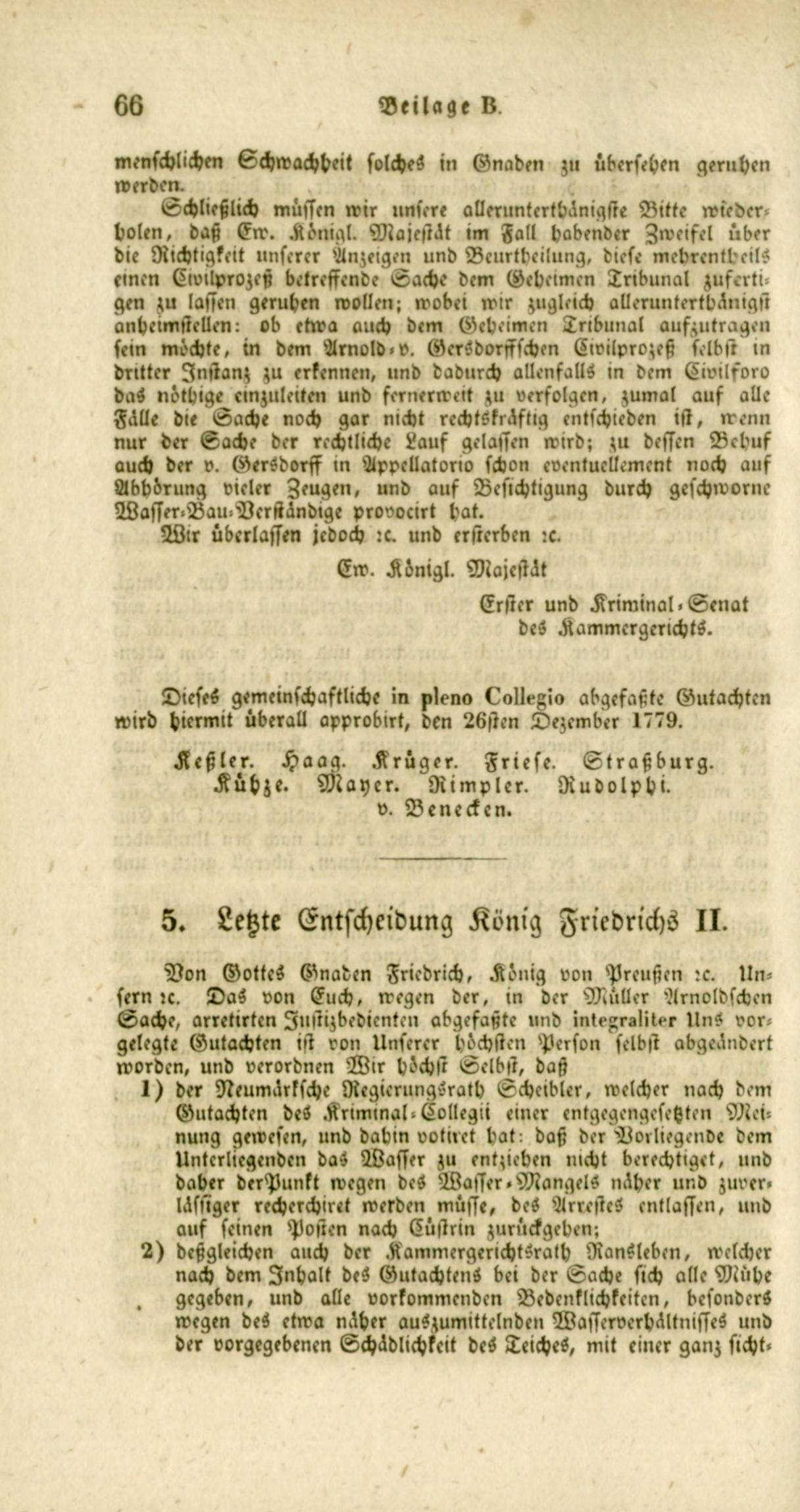
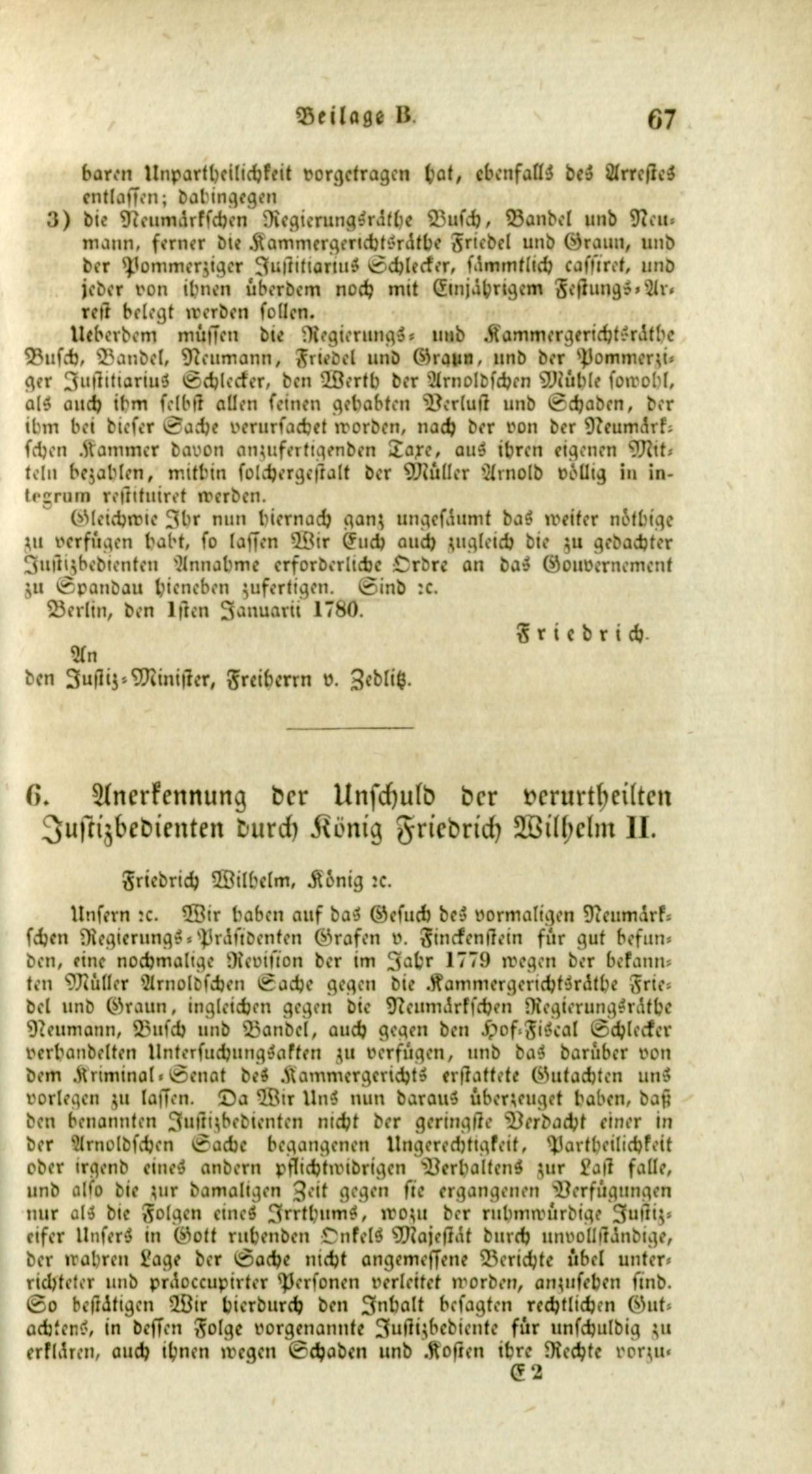

After their audience with Frederick II, the three Kammergericht judges (Friedel, Gaun and Ransleben) were arrested on the king's order and imprisoned at Spandau prison. The king furthermore ordered the arrest of four members of the Neumark provincial court (Scheibler, Busch, Neumann, and Bandel), the arrest of the patrimonial court judge (Schlecker), the arrest of the provincial president of Neumark (Friedrich Ludwig Karl Finck von Finckenstein) and the arrest of von Gersdorf.

The king continued by ordering the criminal indictment of the Kammergericht judges before a criminal panel of the same appellate court. Also on 11 December 1779, the Prussian Minister of Justice, Karl Abraham Zedlitz, received the following cabinet decree (Kabinettsordre) from the king:

So gebe Euch hierdurch auf, daß von Seiten des Criminal-Collegii über diese 3 Leute nach der Schärfe der Gesetze gesprochen und zum mindesten auf Cassation und Festungsarrest erkannt wird, wobey ich Euch auch zugleich zu erkennen gebe, daß, wenn das nicht mit aller Strenge geschieht, Ihr sowohl als auch das Criminalkollegium es mit mir zu thun kriegen werdet.

On the part of the Criminal College, these three people will be judged according to the severity of the laws and at least recognized as being subject to cassation and confinement, whereupon I also immediately indicate that, if this is not done with all severity, both you and the Criminal College will have to deal with me.

— Frederick II

Still, the Kammergericht panel opined after a careful investigation of the case on 26 December 1779 that it "found nothing blameworthy or criminal" ("nichts tadelhaftes oder sträfliches vorfinden") during its investigation of their fellow judges. This expert opinion was later published.

Frederick II nevertheless commanded von Zedlitz on 27 December 1779 to order that all judges involved be sentenced according to the severity of the law. When von Zedlitz refused, the king himself sentenced the judges (but not the judges of the criminal panel who refused to sentence their colleagues) by cabinet decree (Kabinettsordre) on 1 January 1780. (Note: Published in Sietze 1835, p. 66 of Beilage B) He acquitted Scheibler (Neumark provincial court) and Ransleben (Kammergericht) but convicted all the six other judges (Buch, Bandel, Neumann [Neumark provincial court], Friedel, Gaun [Kammergericht] and Schlecker [patrimonial court]) involved in the case and sentenced them each to one year imprisonment (Festungshaft) in Spandau prison. The disobedience by von Zedlitz went unpunished.

After nine months of imprisonment, the convicted judges were released from prison. They were only rehabilitated after Frederick's death and his succession by Frederick William II, who in 1786 annulled his predecessor's decrees, (Note: Published in v. Dohm 1814, p. 583) rehabilitated the judges, reinstated them into their former offices and reimbursed them for the sums they had been forced to refund personally.

=== Arnolds' case resolution ===
The case of Christian and Rosine Arnold was finally resolved when Frederick II ordered the restoration of the grain mill to them and sentenced the judges he had convicted to indemnify the couple fully for their incurred costs ("völlig in integrum restituirt"). In 1779 the Arnolds regained the grain mill, and the carp ponds to which the water needed to power the mill had been diverted were filled up. In March 1780, von Gersdorf was ordered to indemnify the widow Poelchen. Von Schmettau was not condemned by the king for his involvement in the affair, but was disfavoured so much that Frederick II refused von Schmettau's request for assistance during the Oder flood in 1783.

Whether Frederick II later regretted his strong intervention in the affair is still subject to academic debate.

== Contemporary reactions ==
=== Berlin society reactions ===
In Berlin, the interventions by Frederick II were not particularly well received. Berlin society argued that no injustice had been done to the miller and his wife and many thought that their claims were without merit. Berlin society thus thoroughly sided with the courts' assessment of the case and the views of the noblemen involved.

=== Foreign reactions ===
Outside of Prussia the interventions by the king were received positively. They were considered to be as an example of a just ruler that sided with the commoners against nobility. Catherine the Great is said to have called the king "Solomon of the North" and sent to her senate a copy of the king's protocol dated 11 December 1779. Furthermore, it is claimed, that the Sultan of Morocco had all Prussian prisoners from his jails released without the usual ransom payment after he learned of the affair. The Italian engraver Vincenzio Vangelisti positively immortalised the case and the king's interventions with his copperplate etching "Balance de Frederic".

== Assessment of the legality of Frederick's interventions and legend ==
=== Assessment of the legality ===
Concerning the legality of the interventions by Frederick II, the general view is that the actions of the king were lawful in a formal constitutional sense as they were consistent with the jurisprudential powers of an absolutist monarch.

Academically, the affair is still subject to debate on two levels: At the lower level, there is still a debate as to whether the king's assessment of the case or the appraisals of the facts by the courts were correct according to the substantive civil law of the time.

The more important, higher, scholarly debate concerns how the interventions of the king in a specific court case should be viewed. A classic view (held, e.g., by Eberhard Schmidt) is that the intervention of Frederick II in the Arnolds' case was illegitimate and constituted a "judicial catastrophe" ("Justizkatastrophe").

A differing view is that the Prussian justice system was, at the time, in a phase of transition between unrestrained cabinet justice to the eventual ousting of the monarch from the sphere of justice. Christoph Sowada argues that the case is interesting precisely because judicial independence did not exist in Prussian law at the time, but was beginning to exist as an idea. Therefore, the king's intervention was in accordance with the law and practice of its time but not with its intellectual currents. In his view, the case did not delay the move towards judicial independence in Prussia but advanced it. Thus, it is argued that the affair should not be viewed as a "judicial catastrophe" but as a stepping stone towards modern conceptions of judicial independence.

In 1792, the General State Laws for the Prussian States were codified, beginning the official legal reconsideration of the king's role relating to the Prussian judiciary. Judicial independence would be formalized on 31 January 1850 via Section 86 of the 1850 Prussian Constitution.

=== Legend ===
The case is to this day sometimes mistakenly associated with the Historic Mill of Sanssouci, which, however, is not a water mill, but a wind mill.
