= Kammergericht =

Highest ordinary state court in Berlin, Germany

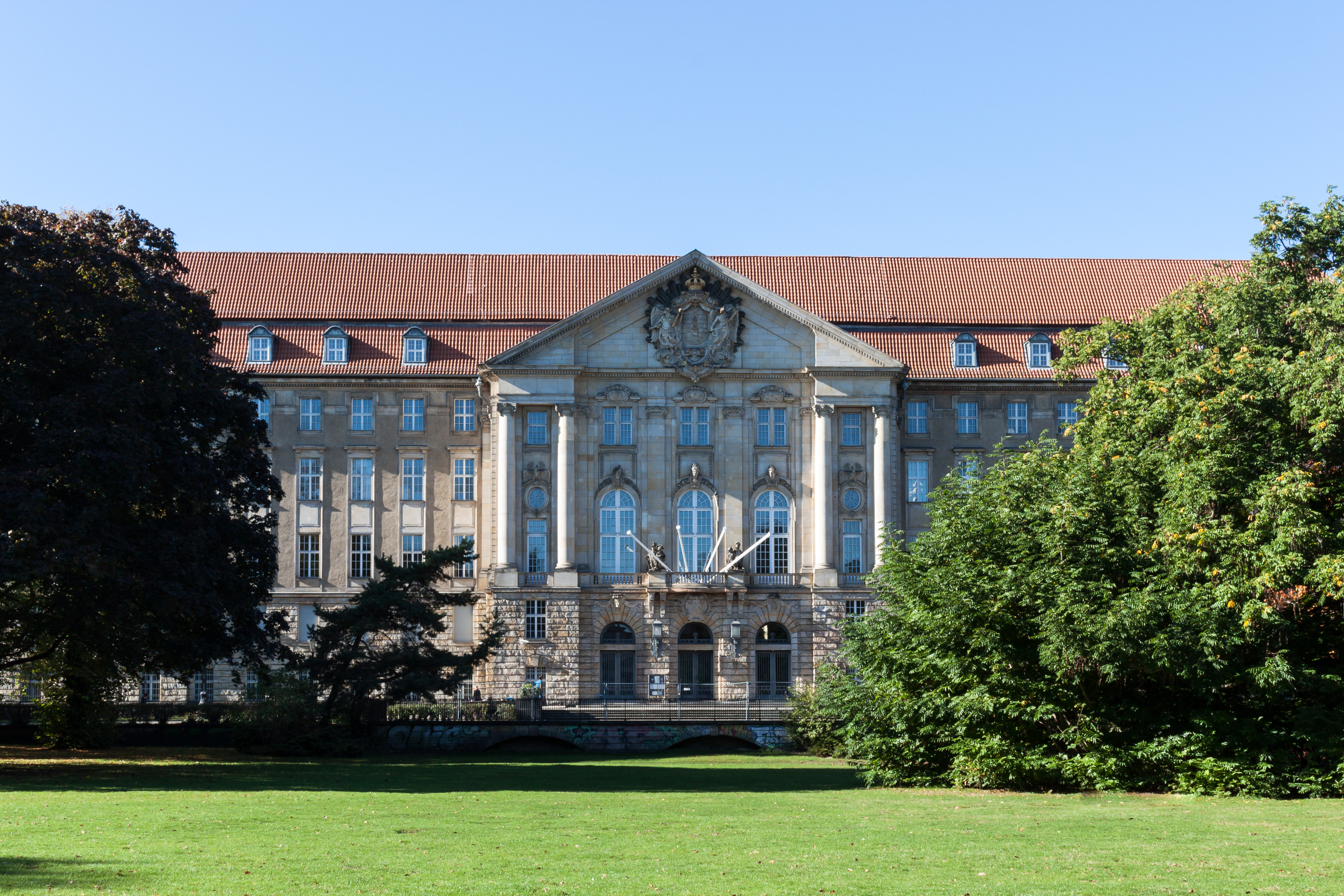
- Kammergericht building, view from Kleistpark
- Interactive map of Kammergericht
- 52.492447°N 13.357181°E
- Established: 15th century
- Jurisdiction: Berlin, Germany
- Location: Elßholzstraße 30-31, Berlin-Schöneberg
- Coordinates: 52.492447°N 13.357181°E
- Authorised by: Gerichtsverfassungsgesetz
- Website: berlin.de/gerichte/kammergericht

President
- Currently: Bernd Pickel

The Kammergericht (KG) is the Oberlandesgericht, the highest state court, for the city-state of Berlin, Germany. As an ordinary court according to the German Courts Constitution Act (Gerichtsverfassungsgesetz), it deals with criminal and civil cases, superior to the local Amtsgerichte and the Landgericht Berlin. Its name differs from other state courts for historic reasons; it is the only court called Kammergericht in Germany.

== History ==
A Kammergericht was first mentioned in 1468, when it adjudicated in the chambers (German: Kammern) of the prince-electors of Brandenburg. According to the privilegium de non-appellando granted by the Holy Roman Emperor, the Brandenburg subjects were prohibited from appealing to the Imperial authority. Therefore, the Kammergericht acted as supreme court in the Imperial estate ruled by the Hohenzollern electors.

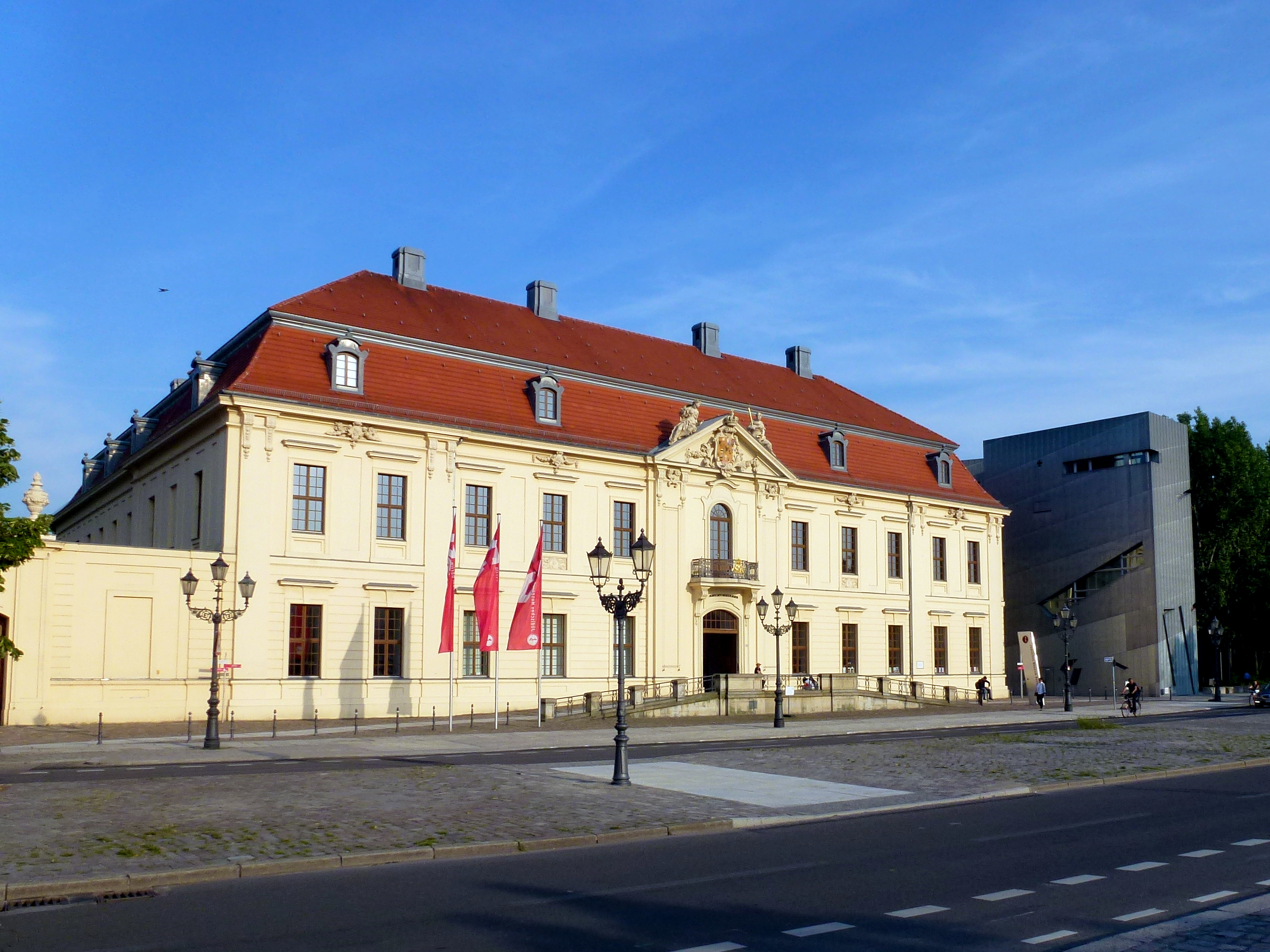
Collegienhaus

As the appellate court of Brandenburg-Prussia and the Kingdom of Prussia from 1701, it was since 1698 based in the central Cölln quarter of Berlin. In 1735, under the rule of King Frederick William I, it moved to the newly erected Baroque Collegienhaus in the Friedrichstadt district (in present-day Kreuzberg). It then housed the supreme courts and judges of the different territories ruled in personal union by the royal House of Hohenzollern, without formally merging the different juridical systems. By that concentration in one locality, the later unification of the juridical systems was prepared. The Collegienhaus is today part of the Jewish Museum Berlin.

From the 18th century, the Kammergericht gained a reputation as an independent authority in notable lawsuits such as the Miller Arnold case or in the trial of Johann Heinrich Schulz. After the Greater Poland Uprising of 1846, numerous Polish insurgents, among them Ludwik Mierosławski and Karol Libelt, were tried at the Kammergericht, but amnestied by King Frederick William IV during the 1848 revolution. After German unification and the establishment of the uniform term Oberlandesgericht for a state supreme court by the German Empire in 1877, the Kammergericht kept its name.

== Kleistpark building ==
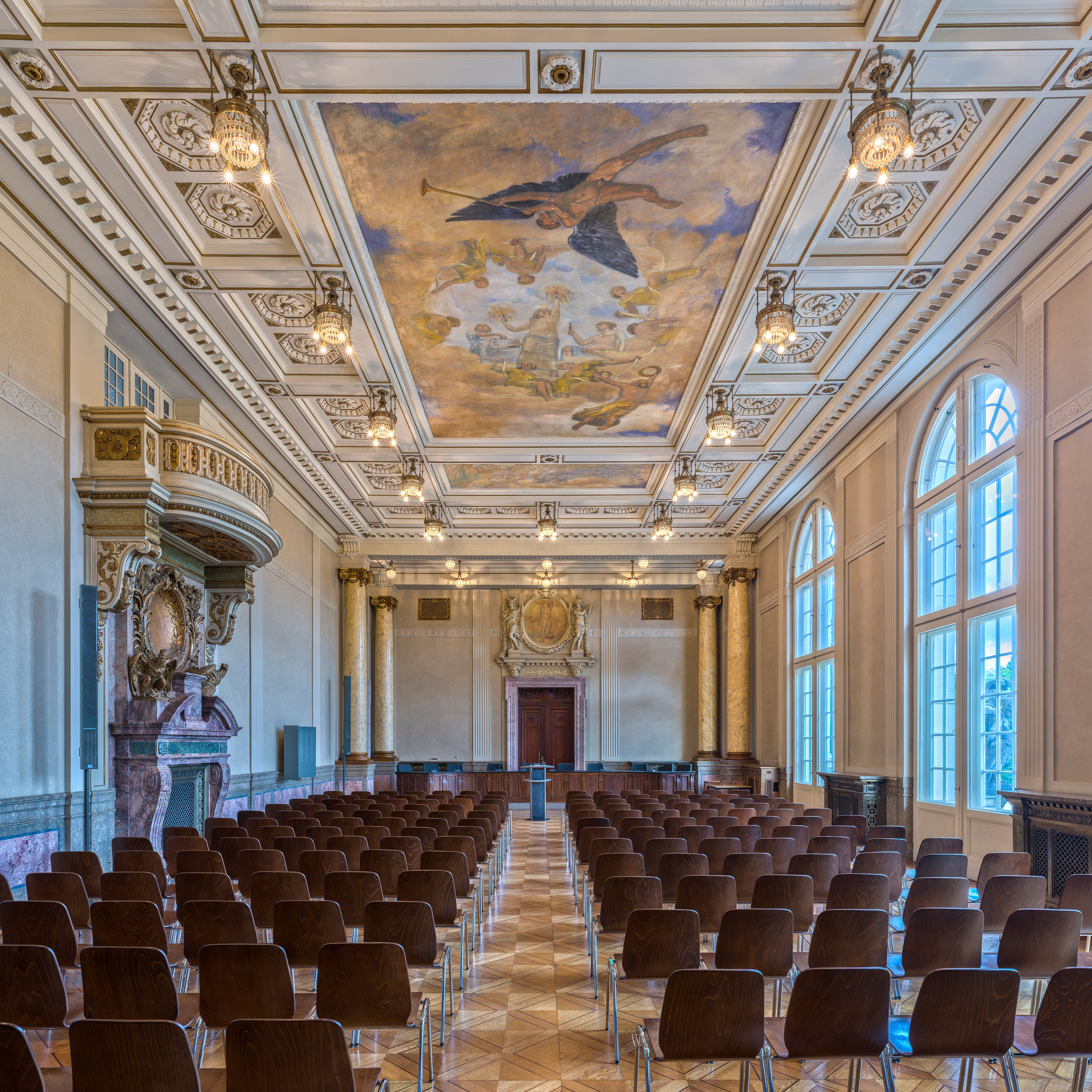
Plenary hall

In 1913, it moved to its present location in a newly erected Neo-Baroque building in the former Botanical Garden, laid out by Johann Sigismund Elsholtz in 1679, which had been relocated to the Dahlem and Lichterfelde in 1898. The premises in the present-day Schöneberg district were renamed Heinrich-von-Kleist-Park on the occasion of the hundredths anniversary of the death of Heinrich von Kleist on 21 November 1911. It became colloquially known as Kleistpark.

In August 1944 the Kleistpark building was the site of the show trial conducted by the People's Court (Volksgerichtshof) under Judge Roland Freisler against the surviving conspirators of the 20 July plot. 9 months later, the Allied Control Council began using the building. On 18 October 1945, the International Military Tribunal (IMT) of the Nuremberg trials held its constituent meeting here.

The building remained the official seat of the council, though its meeting discontinued after the Soviet representatives left in protest in March 1948. On 3 September 1971, the Four Power Agreement on Berlin was signed here. The Kammergericht was based at the former Reichskriegsgericht in Charlottenburg during the Cold War era, until it moved back to its former location in 1997.

Extensively restored, the Kammergericht building today is also the seat of the Constitutional Court of the State of Berlin (Verfassungsgerichtshof des Landes Berlin) and the state's Attorney General (Generalstaatsanwalt).

== Notable members ==
- Samuel von Cocceji, president 1723-1738
- Julius Eduard Hitzig
- E. T. A. Hoffmann
- Wilhelm Heinrich Wackenroder

== See also ==
- Judiciary of Germany
