= Carl Gottlieb Svarez =

Prussian jurist and reformer

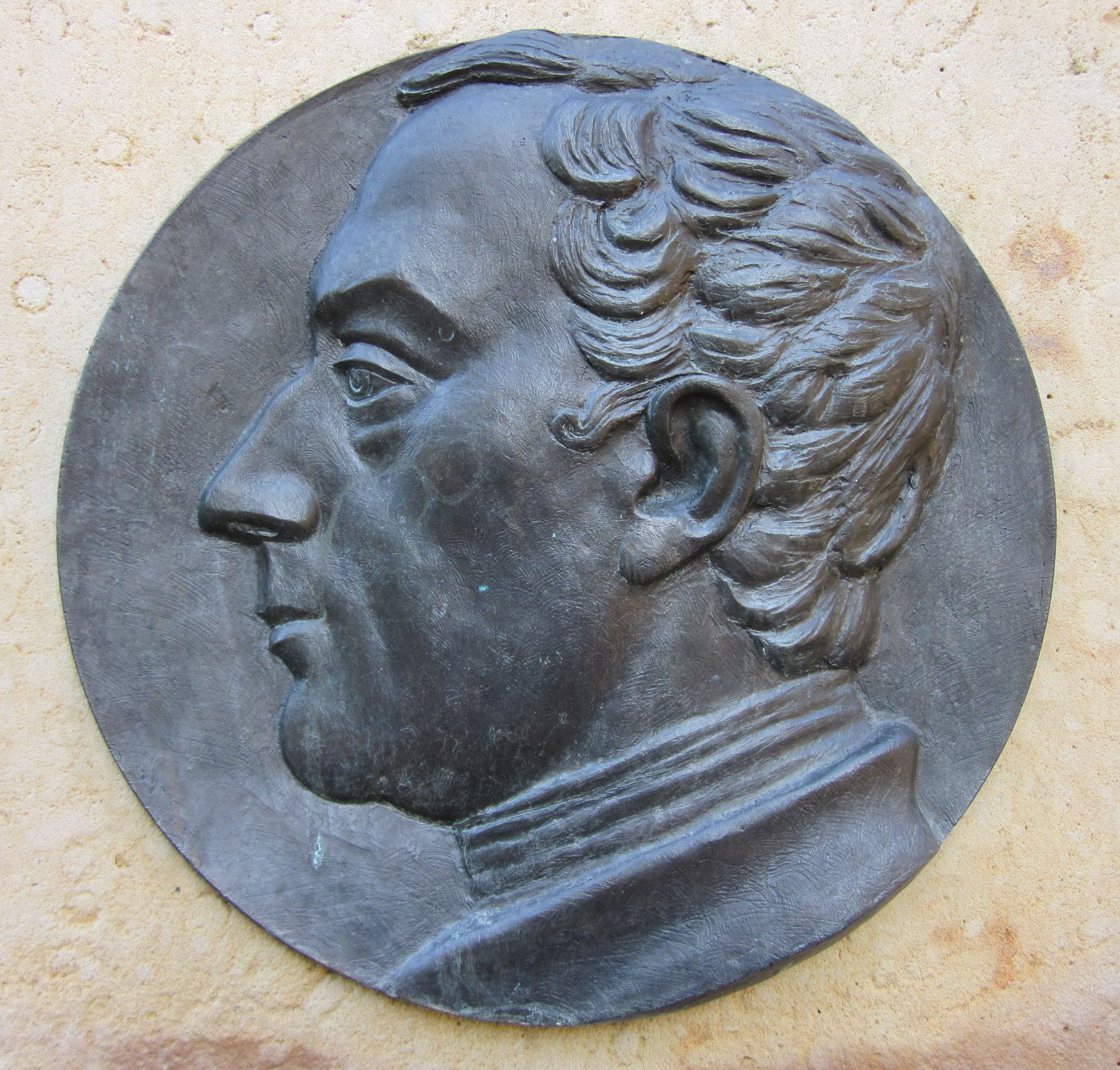
Medaillon with portrait of Carl Gottlieb Svarez

Carl Gottlieb Svarez, originally Schwartz (27 February 1746 in Schweidnitz – 14 May 1798 in Berlin) was a Prussian jurist and reformer who worked on the Landrecht.

== Bibliography ==
- Adolf Stölzel, Carl Gottlieb Svarez, Berlin 1885
- Ausgewählte Literaturnachweise aus dem Bestand der Akademiebibliothek. Karl Gottlieb Svarez, Jurist Writings by and about Svarez, Berlin-Brandenburgischen Akademie der Wissenaschaften, 2002 (pdf)
