= Enlightenment =

Enlightenment or enlighten may refer to:

== History ==
- Age of Enlightenment, period in Western intellectual and cultural history from the late 17th to late 18th century, centered in France and Great Britain but also encompassing:
  - Dutch Enlightenment, in the 17th- and 18th-century Netherlands
  - French Enlightenment, in 17th- and 18th-century France
  - Midlands Enlightenment, in the 18th-century English Midlands
  - German Enlightenment, in the 18th century in modern-day Germany
  - Austrian Enlightenment, in the 18th century in modern-day Austria
  - Modern Greek Enlightenment, in the 18th century in modern-day Greece
  - Hungarian Enlightenment, in the 18th century in modern-day Hungary
  - Italian Enlightenment, in 18th-century Italy
  - Jewish Haskalah or Jewish Enlightenment, movement among European Jews in the late 18th century
  - Polish Enlightenment, in 18th-century Poland
  - Portuguese Enlightenment, in 18th-century Portugal
  - Romanian Enlightenment, in the 18th century in modern-day Romania
  - Russian Enlightenment, in 18th-century Russia
  - Scottish Enlightenment, in 18th-century Scotland
  - Spanish Enlightenment, in 18th-century Spain, under the Bourbons
  - Swedish Enlightenment, in 18th-century Sweden
  - American Enlightenment, in the 18th century in the British North American colonies and the early United States
- Nahda, cultural movement of Arab-populated regions of the Ottoman Empire during the 19th and early 20th centuries
- In China:
  - May Fourth Movement, in the 1920s
  - New Enlightenment (China), in the 1980s

== Philosophy ==
- Enlightenment (philosophical concept), the concept of enlightenment in modern and contemporary Western philosophy
- Enlightenment philosophy, the philosophy produced during the Enlightenment (late 17th and 18th centuries)

== Religion ==
- Enlightenment in Buddhism, translation of the term bodhi ("awakening")
- Moksha
- Moksha (Jainism)
- Kevala jnana, awakened knowledge in Jainism
- Divine illumination

== Computing ==
- Enlightenment (window manager), an X Window System window manager
- Enlighten (radiosity engine), code to do real-time calculation of indirect lighting ("radiosity") in video
- Enlightenment Foundation Libraries, a set of graphics libraries

== Events ==
- Enlighten Canberra, an annual arts and cultural festival in Canberra, Australia
- "Enlightenment", the main artistic performance in the 2012 Summer Paralympics opening ceremony

== Film and television ==
- Enlightenment (Doctor Who), a 1983 Doctor Who serial

== Music ==
- Enlightenment (Van Morrison album), 1990
- Enlightenment (McCoy Tyner album), 1973
- "Enlightenment" (Van Morrison song), 1990
- Enlightenment (soundtrack album), the soundtrack of the 2012 Summer Paralympics opening ceremony

== Other uses ==
- Ionian Enlightenment, the origin of ancient Greek advances in philosophy and science
- Dark Enlightenment, an anti-democratic and reactionary movement that broadly rejects egalitarianism and Whig historiography
- Enlightenment Movement (Afghanistan), a Hazara grassroots civil disobedience group created in Afghanistan in 2016
- Project Enlightenment, an educational program

== See also ==
- Counter-Enlightenment, a term used by some 20th century commentators to describe contemporary reasoned opposition to the Age of Enlightenment
- Enlightened (disambiguation)
- Illumination (disambiguation)
