= Aufklärer =

Aufklärer (German: [ˈaʊ̯fˌklɛːʁɐ], lit. 'enlightener') may refer to:

- A thinker associated with the Enlightenment, particularly in the German states or in the Habsburg Empire
- A thinker associated with any given enlightenment (philosophical concept)

== See also ==
- Aufklärung (disambiguation)
- Enlightener (disambiguation)
- Illuminator (disambiguation)
