= Aufklärung =

Aufklärung (German: [ˈaʊ̯fˌklɛːʁuŋ], lit. 'enlightenment') may refer to

- The Enlightenment, the European intellectual and cultural movement that flourished primarily in the 18th century, including
  - German Enlightenment or German Aufklärung, in modern-day Germany
  - Austrian Enlightenment or Austrian Aufklärung, in modern-day Austria
  - Jewish Enlightenment or Jewish Aufklärung
- Enlightenment (philosophical concept), the concept of enlightenment in philosophy

== See also ==
- Enlightenment (disambiguation)
