= Kluckhohn =

Kluckhohn is a surname. Notable people with the surname include:

- August (von) Kluckhohn (1832–1893), German historian
- Clyde Kluckhohn (1905–1960), American anthropologist and social theorist
- Fred Kluckhohn (1891–1968), American college football player and coach
