= Lorenz von Westenrieder =

German writer (1748–1829)

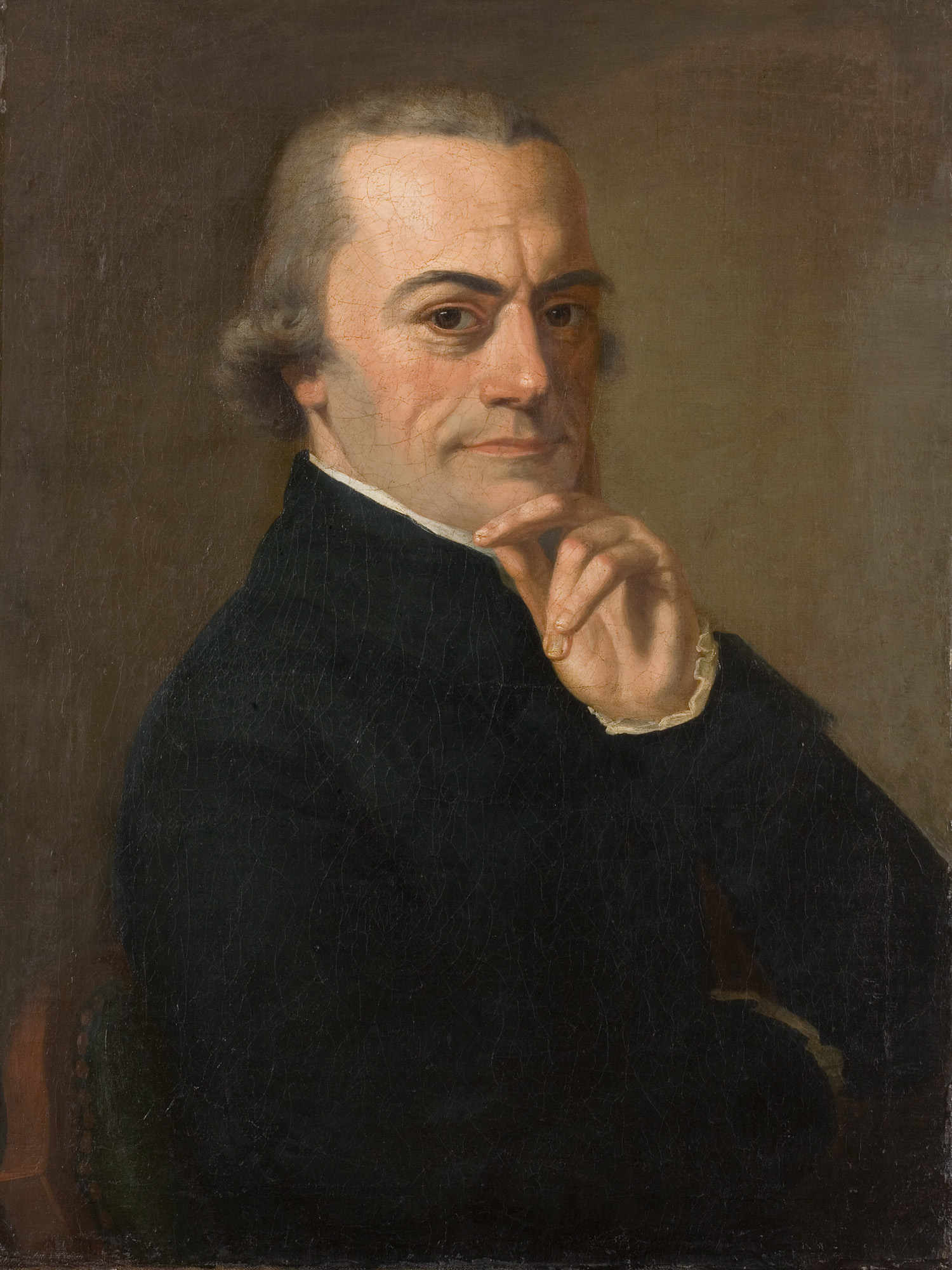
- Moritz Kellerhoven, Portrait of Lorenz von Westenrieder, 1803, oil on canvas, 62,8 cm x 48 cm, Munich Stadtmuseum
- Born: 1 August 1748; Munich, Electorate of Bavaria
- Died: 15 March 1829 (aged 80); Munich, Kingdom of Bavaria
- Occupation: Historian
- Era: Age of Enlightenment

Lorenz von Westenrieder (1 August 1748 – 15 March 1829) was a well-known author and historian in Bavaria and a critic of the Elector Karl Theordor and supporter of Maximilian IV Joseph. There are several memorials to him in Munich.

== Biography and politics ==
Lorenz von Westenrieder was a prominent Bavarian intellectual. He started his career as a professor at the Gymnasium in Landshut. There he taught both rhetoric and poetry until 1774 when he transferred to Munich. In 1776 he was the secretary for history at the Bayerischen Akademie der Wissenschaften. Westenrieder was, for a short time, a member of the Illuminati. Later, in 1799, under the rule of Maximilian IV Joseph he worked for the new revised College for Book Censorship that Maximilian von Montgelas had founded. Westenrieder's membership in the Illuminati may have helped his selection by Von Montgelas, a fellow Illuminatus. Westenrieder was one of the voices in the intellectual movement known as the Bavarian Enlightenment. This occurred much later than the Enlightenment that had already reached its zenith in much of Europe, and would occur in a syncopated form, first under Maximilian III Joseph in the middle of the eighteenth century, and later, during the reign of Maximilian IV Joseph 1799-1806, ending in 1817 with Montgelas's dismissal from King Maximilian I (previously Maximilian IV Joseph).

== Works ==
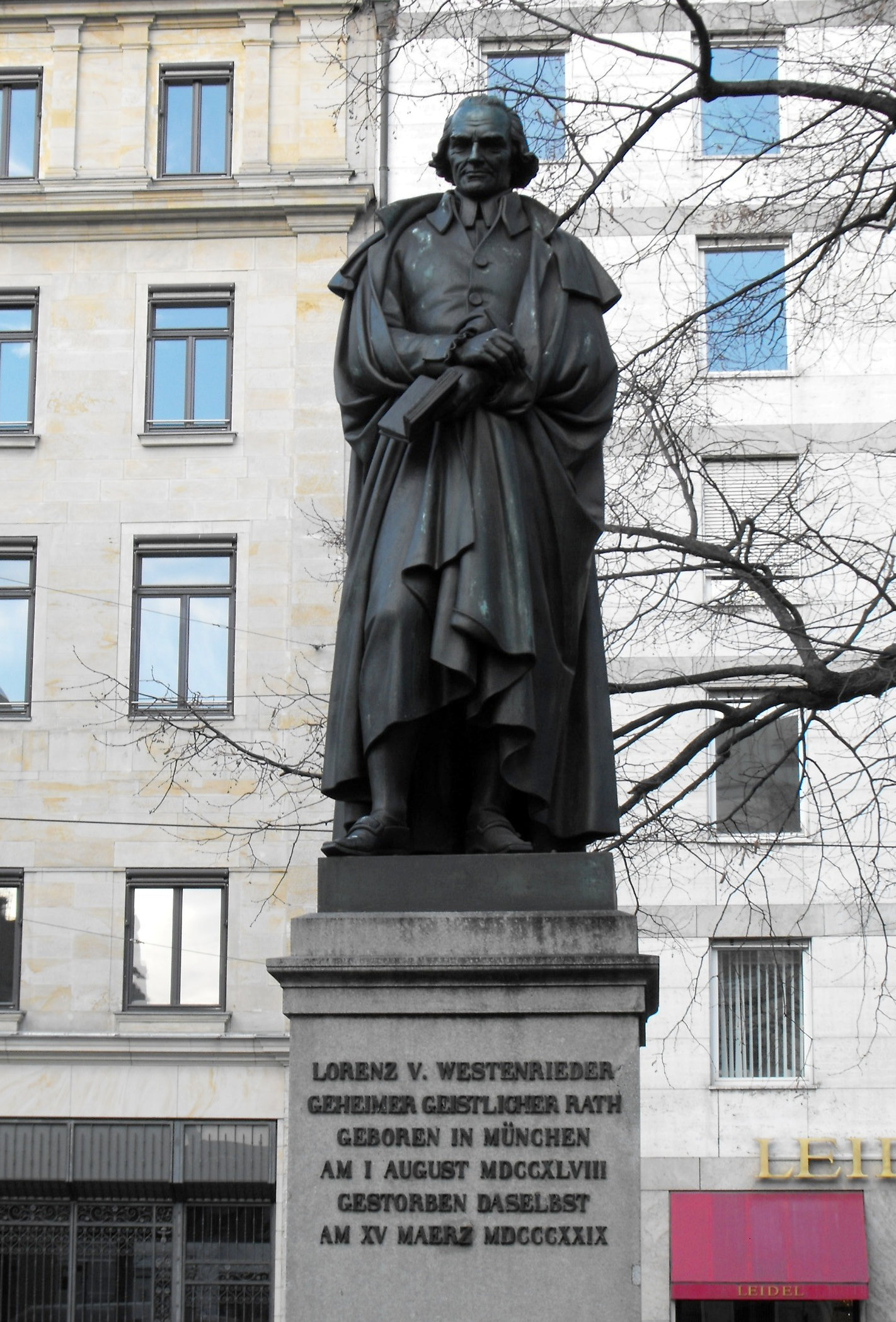
Monument to Lorenz von Westenrieder, located on the Promenadeplatz in Munich.

Lorenz von Westenrieder is better known as an author of German literature than a political figure. During his life, he wrote over thirty separate works:

- Wesentliche Begriffe des praktischen Christenthums. (1774, anon.)
- Rede von den Ursachen, warum die Früchte der Schulverbesserungen nicht plötzlich sichtbar und allgemein werden. (1774)
- Die zween Candidaten. (1774, Lustspiel)
- Marc Aurel. (1776)
- Einleitung in die schönen Wissenschaften. (1777)
- Briefe bairischer Denkungsart und Sitten. (1778)
- Rede zum Andenken des Peters von Osterwald Sr. churfürstl. Durchleucht in Baiern, geheimen Rath, ersten Direktors des churfürstl. geistlichen Raths, dann akademischen Direktors der philosophischen Classe. (1778)
- Baierische Beyträge zur schönen und nützlichen Litteratur. (1779–1781)
- Reden und Abhandlungen. (1780)
- Zum Andenken des Andreas Felix von Oefele. (1780)
- Rede zum Andenken des churfl. Geistl. Raths Sekretärs Anton Johann Lipowsky etc. (1781)
- Leben des guten Jünglings Engelhof. (1781, novel)
- Der Traum in dreyen Nächten. (1782)
- Von dem Verfall der Weltpriester. (1782)
- Von den Baiern in Holland. (1782)
- Beschreibung der Haupt- und Residenzstadt München. (1782)
- Jahrbuch der Menschengeschichte in Bayern. (1782)
- Beschreibung der Haupt- und Residenzstadt München im gegenwärtigen Zustande. (1783)
- Daß es nicht vernünftig sey, unsere Prediger auf eine Art, wie es in den Paragraphen geschah öffentlich herabzusetzen. (1783)
- Vom Verfall des Loden- und Tuchhandels in Bayern, und von den Mitteln ihn wieder aufzuhelfen. (1783, prob. ed. Westenrieder)
- Leben des Johann Franz Seraph edlen von Kohlbrenner, kurfürstl. wirkl. Hofkammer- Mauth- & Commercienraths in Baiern. (1783)
- Beschreibung des Wurm- oder Starenbergersees und der umherliegenden Schlößer [e]tc. samt einer Landkarte. (1784)
- Erdbeschreibung der baierisch-pfälzischen Staaten. (1784)
- Die Geschichte der Baierischen Akademie der Wissenschaften. (1784/1807)
- Geschichte von Baiern für die Jugend und das Volk .(1785)
- Beiträge zur vaterländischen Historie, Geographie, Statistik und Landwirtschaft. (1785–1817)
- Bayrischer historischer Kalender. (1786–1818)
- Von den Nomalisten. (1786)
- Geschichte von Baiern. (1786)
- Ueber die Frage: Welche waren die Grundursachen der zahlreichen, vom 11ten bis ins 15te Jahrhundert in Baiern gestifteten Abteyen? Und wurde von denselben den landesherrlichen Absichten wirklich entsprochen? hat am höchsterfreulichen Geburtsfest Sr. Churfl. Durchlaucht Carl Theodor in einer öffentlichen akademischen Versammlung auf dem Churfl. Bibliotheksaale gelesen Lorenz Westenrieder. (1787)
- Briefe eines Baiern. (1787)
- Ueber die Verheimligung alter Handschriften, und Urkunden. (1788)
- Kaiser Ludwig der Baier. (1792)
- Staatistische Beschreibung des churfürstl. Landgerichts Dachau. (1792)
- Ueber Berichtigungen der Regierungsgeschichte des Herzog Mainhard 1361 - 1363. (1792)
- Betrachtungen über Ludwig, den Brandenburger. (1793)
- Abriß der baierischen Geschichte. (1798)
- Abriß der deutschen Geschichte. (1798)
- Akademische Rede über das Rechtbuch des Ruperts von Freysing. (1802)
- Geschichte meines Backenschmerzens genannt Taismus. (1802)
- Denkrede auf Ildephons Kennedy. (1804)
- Denkrede auf Carl Albert von Vacchiery, königl. wirkl. geheimen Rath und Hofgerichtskanzler. (1808)
- Der Würm- oder Starenbergersee und die umliegende Gegend. (1811)
- Briefe über und aus Gastein. (1817)
- Theses centum, circa materias gravissimas. (1817)
- Über die Wiederherstellung des Jesuitenordens. (1818)
- Handbuch der baierischen Geschichte. (1820)
- Hundert Erinnerungen. (1821)
- Hundert Sonderbarkeiten, oder das neue München im Jahre 1850. (1824)
- Das neue München und Bayern im Jahre 1850. (1828)
- Sämmtliche Werke. (collected works, 29 vols, 1831–1838)
- Aus dem handschriftlichen Nachlaß L. v. Westenrieders. (1882, 2 vols, ed. August Kluckhohn).
