= What Is Enlightenment? (Foucault) =

1983 Philosophical text by Michel Foucault

"What Is Enlightenment?" (French: Qu'est-ce que les Lumières?) is the title of two texts by the philosopher Michel Foucault that deal with the meaning of enlightenment and comment on Immanuel Kant's essay "What Is Enlightenment?" Both texts by Foucault have the same tenor and originate in a lecture at the Collège de France on January 5, 1983.

"What Is Enlightenment?" is also an important contribution in Foucault's debate with Jürgen Habermas. The longer of the two texts first appeared 1984 as "What Is Enlightenment" in English, the shorter and sharper in content in the same year as "Qu'est-ce que les Lumières?" in Magazine littéraire.

== Publication history ==
The long version was first published as "What Is Enlightenment" in English in The Foucault Reader. It was first published in French in 1993 in Magazine littéraire under the title "Kant et la modernité" and in 1994 in the fourth volume of Michel Foucault: Dits et Ecrits 1954–1988, edited by Daniel Defert and François Ewald.

The short text variant appeared in 1984 in French in the Magazine littéraire and in a German translation as "What is Revolution? What is Enlightenment?" in Die Tageszeitung of July 2, 1984. This in turn appeared in English for the first time in 1988 in the anthology Politics, Philosophy, Culture under the title "The Art of Telling the Truth".

== Content ==
In his text, Foucault describes enlightenment with reference to Kant and modernity with reference to Charles Baudelaire, before he describes the ethos of the Enlightenment. In the longer version, he writes about enlightenment:

Enlightenment is thus not merely the process by which individuals would see their own personal freedom of thought guaranteed. There is Enlightenment when the universal, the free, and the public uses of reason are superimposed on one another.

About modernity he says:

Modernity is often characterized in terms of consciousness of the discontinuity of time: a break with tradition, a feeling of novelty, of vertigo in the face of the passing moment.

And the modern man:

Modern man, for Baudelaire, is not the man who goes off to discover himself, his secrets and his hidden truth; he is the man who tries to invent himself. This modernity does not 'liberate man in his own being'; it compels him to face the task of producing himself.

He grants the Enlightenment a more comprehensive existence as a totality of events and processes, considers it fundamental for philosophical reflection, but only the reflective relationship to the present. For him, enlightenment is the question of reason according to its own historicity:

I have been seeking, on the one hand, to emphasize the extent to which a type of philosophical interrogation—one that simultaneously problematizes man's relation to the present, man's historical mode of being, and the constitution of the self as an autonomous subject—is rooted in the Enlightenment. On the other hand, I have been seeking to stress that the thread that may connect us with the Enlightenment is not faithfulness to doctrinal elements, but rather the permanent reactivation of an attitude—that is, of a philosophical ethos that could be described as a permanent critique of our historical era.

Foucault contrasts two types of critical practice, both of which he found in Kant. On the one hand, there is Kant's well-known question of what knowledge about knowledge is possible and what are the limits of knowledge. From this, however, comes the critique of what is universal, necessary, and obligatory, and what is singular, contingent, and a product of circumstances. For Foucault, criticism is no longer a search for universally valid formal structures, but a historical investigation into the events that constitute ourselves and that enable us to see ourselves as subjects.

Foucault thus states that the universal boundary conditions of modernity exist, which induce people to produce themselves. Enlightenment itself is part of what determines who we are, so it's impossible to be for or against it. For things that are outside of the choices, it doesn't matter whether they have legitimacy. While there is no knowledge that is free of or transcends these, it is possible to reinterpret and live in a way that best harmonizes with one's understanding of oneself.

== Sources ==
- Foucault, Michel (1984). "What is Enlightenment?". The Foucault Reader. New York: Pantheon Books. pp. 32–50. ISBN 0394529049. OCLC 10021125.
- Foucault, Michel (1994) [1984]. "Qu'est-ce que les Lumières?". In Defert, Daniel; Ewald, François; Lagrange, Jacques (eds.). Dits et écrits: 1954–1988. Vol. 4: 1980–1988. Paris: Gallimard. pp. 562–578. ISBN 9782070739899. OCLC 31825187.
