= Enlightened =

Enlightened may refer to:

- Enlightened (TV series), an American comedy-drama
- Enlightened (album), 2007, by Dynamic Duo
- The Enlightened, a faction in Ingress (video game)

== See also ==
- Enlightened self-interest, a philosophy in ethics
- Enlightenment in Buddhism, spiritual enlightenment
- Enlightenment (disambiguation)
