= A Symphony of British Music (album) =

Soundtrack album for the 2012 Olympics

Soundtrack album by Various artists
- Released: 12 August 2012
- Recorded: 2012
- Genre: Pop
- Length: 123:02
- Label: Decca

London 2012 Olympic Games chronology
Isles of Wonder (2012)	A Symphony of British Music (2012)	Enlightenment (2012)

A Symphony of British Music is the soundtrack album of the 2012 Summer Olympics closing ceremony. It became available as download on 12 August 2012 and as a two-disc CD on 20 August 2012. It features studio recordings of the performances at the closing ceremony for the London Games.

== Track listing ==
A Symphony of British Music – Disc 1
No.	Title	Artist	Length
1.	"Because"	Urban Voices Collective	0:38
2.	"Salut D'Amour"	Julian Lloyd Webber, London Symphony Orchestra & STOMP	2:57
3.	"Our House"	Madness	2:29
4.	"Parklife (Excerpt)"	Massed Bands of the Household Division	1:14
5.	"West End Girls"	Pet Shop Boys	2:13
6.	"Waterloo Sunset"	Ray Davies, London Symphony Orchestra & Urban Voices Collective	3:22
7.	"Read All About It"	Emeli Sandé	5:56
8.	"Parade of the Athletes"	David Arnold	4:11
9.	"Open Arms"	Elbow, London Symphony Orchestra & Urban Voices Collective	4:47
10.	"One Day Like This"	Elbow, London Symphony Orchestra & Urban Voices Collective	6:44
11.	"Running Up That Hill (A Deal With God Remix)"	Kate Bush	5:32
12.	"Here Comes the Sun"	Urban Voices Collective, Pete Lockett, Students of Smt.Chandrima Misra -Radha Mehta, Prabhat Rao, Varun Verma, Toby Pitman, David Arnold, Bilwal Iyer, Eos Chater, Tania Davis, Elspeth Hanson & Gay-Yee Westerhoff	2:36
13.	"Medal Ceremony"	David Arnold	2:29
14.	"Bohemian Rhapsody (Excerpt)"	Queen	0:51

A Symphony of British Music – Disc 2
No.	Title	Artist	Length
1.	"Imagine"	John Lennon & Liverpool Philharmonic Youth Choir	4:25
2.	"White Light"	George Michael	4:44
3.	"Pinball Wizard"	Kaiser Chiefs	3:02
4.	"Fashion"	David Bowie	3:33
5.	"Little Bird"	Annie Lennox	5:52
6.	"Wish You Were Here"	Ed Sheeran, Richard Jones, Nick Mason, Mike Rutherford, David Arnold	3:31
7.	"Pure Imagination"	Russell Brand & London Symphony Orchestra	0:58
8.	"I Am the Walrus"	Russell Brand & Bond	4:13
9.	"Right Here, Right Now (Excerpt)"	Fatboy Slim	1:28
10.	"The Rockafeller Skank (Excerpt)"	Fatboy Slim	1:45
11.	"Price Tag / Written in the Stars / Dynamite"	Jessie J, Tinie Tempah, Taio Cruz	5:07
12.	"You Should Be Dancing (Feat. Jessie J, Tinie Tempah, Taio Cruz)"	Bee Gees	2:02
13.	"Wannabe / Spice Up Your Life"	Spice Girls	3:34
14.	"Always Look On the Bright Side of Life"	Eric Idle	4:38
15.	"Survival"	Muse	4:17
16.	"Queen Medley: Day-O/Brighton Rock"	Queen	1:48
17.	"We Will Rock You (Feat. Jessie J)"	Queen	2.41
18.	"Olympic Anthem"	The London Welsh Male Voice Choir, The London Welsh Rugby Choir & London Symphony Orchestra	2:48
19.	"Extinguishing the Flame"	London Symphony Orchestra	0:58
20.	"Rule the World"	Take That	4:14
21.	"Spirit of the Flame"	David Arnold	4:26
22.	"Baba O'Riley (Edited Version)"	The Who	2:44
23.	"See Me, Feel Me (Edited Version)"	The Who	2:38
24.	"My Generation (Excerpt)"	The Who	1:37

== See also ==
- “Survival”: the official song for the London 2012 Olympics
- Isles of Wonder: official soundtrack album of the London 2012 Olympics opening ceremony
