= Enlightener =

Enlightener, as meaning 'one who enlightens', may refer to:

- A thinker associated with the Enlightenment
- A thinker associated with any given enlightenment (philosophical concept)
- Enlightener (title), a title of Eastern Orthodox saints
