= Austrian Enlightenment =

The Austrian Enlightenment (Note: Less commonly called the "Austrian Aufklärung" in English.) (German: die österreichische Aufklärung) refers to the intellectual and cultural movement that flourished in 18th-century Austria (then a constituent of the Habsburg Empire) as part of the broader Enlightenment (historically known in German as die Aufklärung).

The Austrian Enlightenment came "quite late", beginning under Maria Theresa's reign, and was "largely transmitted through the Freemasons". It continued during the reign of Joseph II, who ruled as an enlightened despot.

Religious questions held an important place in the Austrian Enlightenment. On the political level, the Austrian Enlightenment stayed at a distance from the Rousseauists and from the democratic utopia, which thinkers of Central Europe felt were hardly applicable to Habsburg territories.

In his work about the Austrian Enlightenment, Ernst Wangermann distinguished, on one hand, the point of view of conservative Catholic historians, for whom this movement had been something completely alien to the real Austrian traditions, as something which had been imported from outside and had been anti-Catholic; and, on the other hand, the point of view of liberal and anti-clerical historians who, in light of the concept of Greater Germany, considered the Austrian Enlightenment to have been a pale reflection or an imitation of the German Enlightenment.

Among the main Austrian enlighteners were Joseph von Sonnenfels, Karl von Zinzendorf and Gerard van Swieten. Karl Anton von Martini, professor of natural law at the University of Vienna, was another key figure of the Austrian Enlightenment, who proposed changes to modernize the Austrian school system.

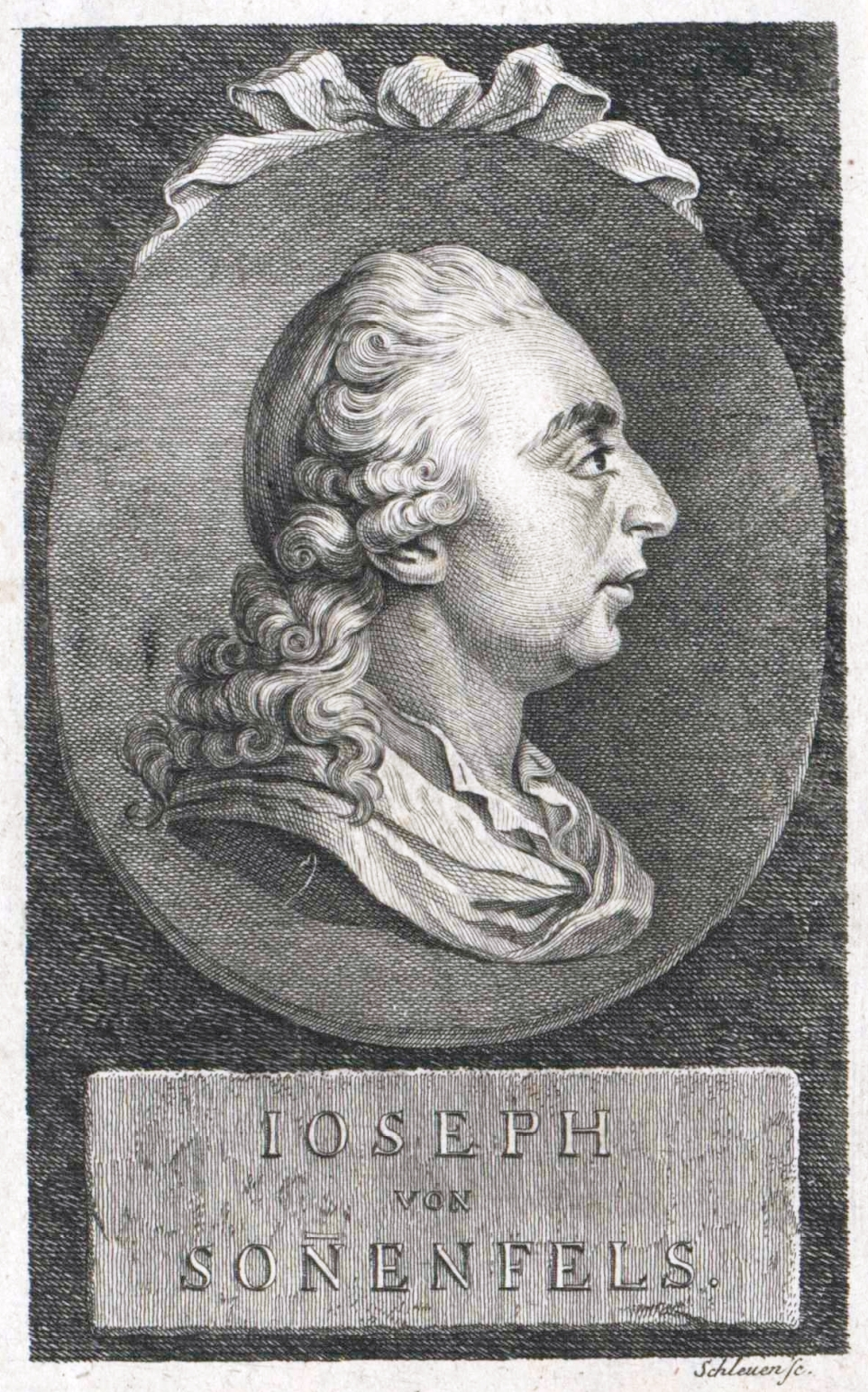
Joseph von Sonnenfels

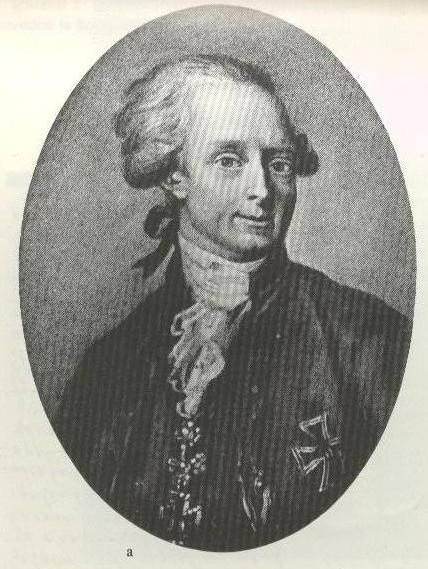
Karl von Zinzendorf

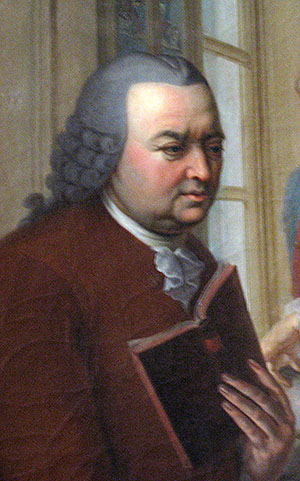
Gerard van Swieten

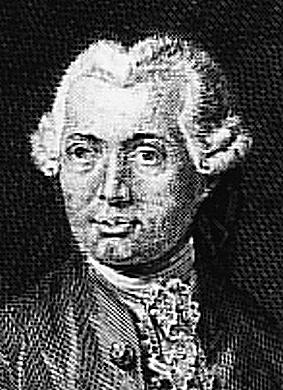
Karl Anton von Martini

== Sources ==
- Ingrao, Charles W. (2019). The Habsburg Monarchy, 1618–1815.
- Lauzun, Hélène de (2021). Histoire de l'Autriche (in French).
- Melton, James Van Horn (2008). "The Theresian School Reform of 1774". Early Modern Europe. Blackwell.
