= August Kluckhohn =

German historian

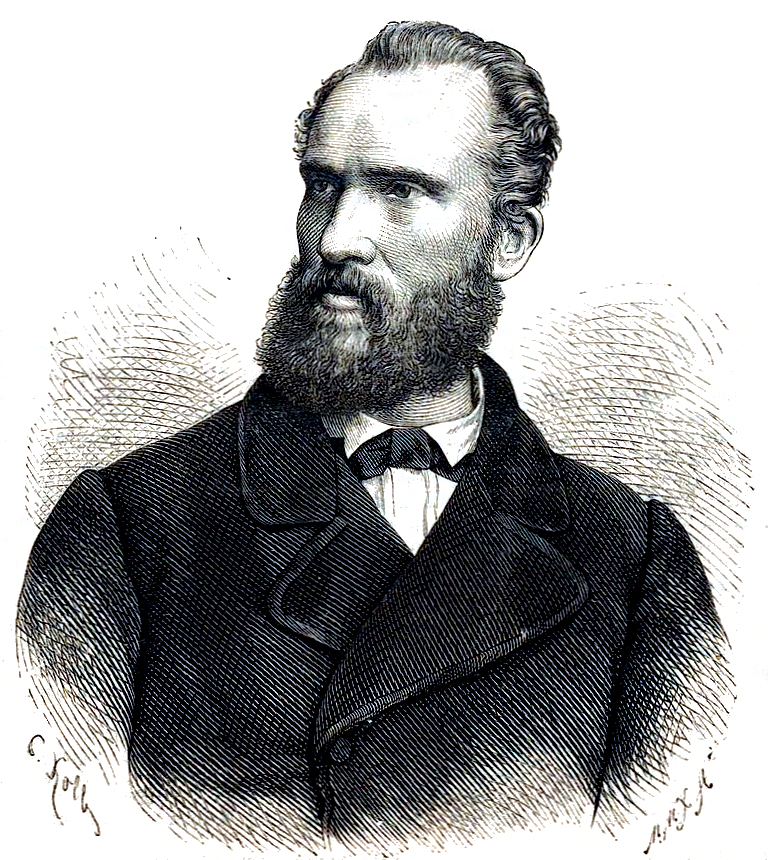

August Kluckhohn (6 July 1832 – 19 May 1893) was a German historian, born at Bavenhausen in Lippe.

He studied at Heidelberg University as a pupil of Ludwig Häusser, and at the University of Göttingen, where he was influenced by Georg Waitz. In 1858 he went to Munich to become editor of the "critical division" of Sybel's Historische Zeitschrift. He became an instructor in history at the Ludwig-Maximilians-Universität München in 1860, five years later being promoted to associate professor. In 1869, he was appointed a full professor of history at the Polytechnic School of Munich, and in 1883, he returned to the University of Göttingen as a successor to historian Reinhold Pauli.

== Selected works ==
His works include:

- Geschichte des Gottesfriedens (1857) – History of the Gottesfrieden.
- Wilhelm III., Herzog von Bayern-München (1861) – William III, Duke of Bavaria.
- Ludwig der Reiche, Herzog von Bayern-Landshut (1865) – Louis IX, Duke of Bavaria-Landshut.
- Friedrich der Fromme, Kurfürst von der Pfalz (1876–79) – Frederick III, Elector Palatine.
- Luise, Königin von Preussen (1876) – Louise of Mecklenburg-Strelitz, Queen of Prussia.
- Blücher (1879) – Gebhard Leberecht von Blücher.
- Ueber L. von Westenrieders Leben und Schriften (1890) – Lorenz von Westenrieder's life and writings.
- Vorträge und Aufsätze (Heigel and Wrede, Munich, 1894) – Lectures and essays.

He was the author of several biographies in the Allgemeine Deutsche Biographie.
