= Fred Kluckhohn =

American football and basketball coach (1891–1968)

Fred Kluckhorn
Biographical details
- Born: November 21, 1891; Reddick, Illinois, U.S.
- Died: November 3, 1968 (aged 76); Naperville, Illinois, U.S.

Playing career

Football
- 1913–1916: North-Western College

Coaching career (HC unless noted)

Football
- 1917–1919: North-Western College

Basketball
- 1917–1920: North-Western College

Head coaching record
- Overall: 13–6–1 (football); 22–19 (basketball))

Fredrick Richard Kluckhorn (November 21, 1891 – November 3, 1968) was an American college football and college basketball and coach. He served as the head football coach at North-Western College—now known as North Central College—in Naperville, Illinois from 1917 to 1919, compiling a record of 13–6–1. Kluckhorn was also the head basketball coach at North-Western College from 1917 to 1920, tallying a mark of 22–19 in three seasons.

Kluckhorn was born on November 21, 1891, in Reddick, Illinois, to Henry G. and Linnie (Hauswirth) Kluckhorn. He attended North-Western College, where he competed in football, basketball, and track and field. In the late 1920, Kluckhorn was working as a retail coal merchant in Naperville. He died suddenly, on November 3, 1968.

== Head coaching record ==
=== College football ===
Year	Team	Overall	Conference	Standing	Bowl/playoffs
North-Western College (Independent) (1917–1919)
1917	North-Western College	6–1			
1918	North-Western College	2–4			
1919	North-Western College	5–1–1			
North-Western College:		13–6–1			
Total:		13–6–1			
