= Project Enlightenment =

Project Enlightenment is a historical interpretation society affiliated with McLean High School. The project was begun in 1992 by Physics teacher Dean Howarth, who estimated in 2008 that 400-500 members had passed through the group in 16 years, although this figure is unsubstantiated. In 2011, it was expanded into a fully credited Living History class.

The group focuses on the late eighteenth-century enlightenment era. A wide range of subject areas are represented by members, including the natural sciences, music, literature, military affairs, art, and politics. It is unusual among similar reenacting groups in its extensive interpretation of civilian affairs, especially scientific.

== Notable Events ==
The group performs annually at George Washington's Mount Vernon.

The group works closely with several notable historical sites in Alexandria, Virginia, and frequently makes appearances at Gadsby's Tavern Museum and the Stabler-Leadbeater Apothecary Shop.

Project Enlightenment has appeared at James Madison's Montpelier, along with notable James Madison reënactor John Douglass Hall.
