= Enlightenment (soundtrack album) =

Soundtrack album by Various artists
- Released: 30 August 2012
- Genre: Pop
- Length: 57:37
- Label: Decca Music Group

London 2012 Olympic Games chronology
A Symphony of British Music (2012)	Enlightenment (2012)

Enlightenment is the official soundtrack album of the 2012 Summer Paralympics opening ceremony. It was released as digital download on 30 August 2012. It features dialog from Stephen Hawking.

== Track listing ==
No.	Title	Artist(s)	Length
1.	"Prologue"	London Symphony Orchestra & David Charles Abell	2:52
2.	"Jasmine's Theme"	London Symphony Orchestra & David Charles Abell	4:07
3.	"Principia"	Barts Choir, The London Chorus, Hackney Singers, London Gay Men's Chorus, Lewisham Choral Society, Hackney Empire Community Choir, London Symphony Orchestra & David Charles Abell	3:51
4.	"Spirit in Motion"	London Symphony Orchestra, David Charles Abell & Denise Leigh	4:37
5.	"Declaration of the Games"	London Symphony Orchestra & David Charles Abell	0:42
6.	"Hymne a l'avenir"	London Symphony Orchestra & David Charles Abell	2:14
7.	"Brave New World"	London Symphony Orchestra & David Charles Abell	1:36
8.	"Eternal Source of Light Divine (feat. Phil Cobb)"	London Symphony Orchestra, David Charles Abell & Elin Manahan Thomas	4:00
9.	"Navigation"	London Symphony Orchestra & David Charles Abell	4:14
10.	"Storm"	London Symphony Orchestra & David Charles Abell	2:09
11.	"Gravity"	London Symphony Orchestra & David Charles Abell	1:20
12.	"Masque"	London Symphony Orchestra & David Charles Abell	3:47
13.	"Where Is It Going? (Paralympics Mix) / Spasticus Autisticus"	Orbital & Graeae Theatre Company	5:56
14.	"Glass"	London Symphony Orchestra & David Charles Abell	1:28
15.	"Entry of the Flame"	London Symphony Orchestra & David Charles Abell	3:36
16.	"I Am What I Am"	Beverley Knight	4:57
17.	"National Anthem"	Barts Choir, The London Chorus, Hackney Singers, London Gay Men's Chorus, Lewisham Choral Society, Hackney Empire Community Choir, London Symphony Orchestra & David Charles Abell	2:03
18.	"Umbrella (feat. Jay-Z) (Seamus Haji & Paul Emanuel Radio Edit)"	Rihanna	4:00
