= Ernst Wangermann =

Austrian historian (1925–2021)

Ernst Wangermann (22 January 1925 - 26 November 2021) was an Austrian historian.

== Biography ==
Wangermann was born in Vienna. He emigrated with his sister from Austria to the UK in 1939 on one of the Kindertransport, following the Anschluss and due to the anti-Semitism his family faced there. His first years in the UK were spent in Manchester, where he was supported by the Quaker community. In 1946 he obtained a scholarship to read history at Balliol College, Oxford where he studied under the Marxist historian Christopher Hill.

== Academic career ==
After receiving his DPhil in 1953, Wangermann was appointed Lecturer in Modern History at the University of Leeds. He was promoted to Senior Lecturer in 1970 and to Reader in 1977. At Leeds his teaching was mainly concerned with European social and intellectual history in the period between the French Revolution of 1789 and the Russian Revolution of 1917.

From 1984 to 1995 Wangermann was Professor of Austrian history at the Institute for History at the University of Salzburg. In 1997, he was the recipient of a Festschrift.

== Marriage and children ==
In 1966 Wangermann married Maria Josefa Fernández, a lectora in the Spanish Department at Leeds. They had two sons.

== Death ==
Wangermann died at his home in Salzburg on 26 November 2021, aged 96.

== Major works ==
- Von Joseph II. zu den Jakobinerprozessen (in German). Wien 1966, OCLC 490924873.
- Aufklärung und staatsbürgerliche Erziehung. Gottfried van Swieten als Reformator des österreichischen Unterrichtswesens 1781–1791 (in German). Munich 1978, ISBN 3-486-48711-6.
- Die Waffen der Publizität. Zum Funktionswandel der politischen Literatur unter Joseph II. (in German). Vienna 2004, ISBN 3-486-56839-6.
- Aufklärung und Josephinismus. Studien zu Ursprung und Nachwirkungen der Reformen Josephs II. (in German). Bochum 2016, ISBN 978-3-89911-257-3.
