= Enlightenment (philosophical concept) =

Philosophical concept

In modern and contemporary Western philosophy, an enlightenment (German: Aufklärung; plural: Aufklärungen) refers to any historically situated process in which individuals or societies use reason to overcome ignorance and to shape their own development. The concept originates with Immanuel Kant's 1784 essay, "Answering the Question: What Is Enlightenment?", in which he defined enlightenment as "man's emergence from his self-imposed immaturity". A thinker who participates in or promotes such a process may be called an enlightener (German: Aufklärer).

While the term often evokes "the" Western Enlightenment of the late 17th and 18th centuries, contemporary philosophers such as Max Horkheimer (1895–1973), Theodor W. Adorno (1903–1969) and Michel Foucault (1926–1984) have emphasized that there are multiple, context-specific enlightenments. For example, in his 1984 work "What Is Enlightenment?" (drawing on Kant's 1784 essay), Foucault refers to different enlightenments as varied and situated practices of critique and rationality across human history. The Jewish Haskalah, sometimes called the "Jewish Enlightenment" or the "Jewish Aufklärung", is another such example of a culturally distinct enlightenment.

Published after World War II, Horkheimer and Adorno's Dialectic of Enlightenment (1947) shows that enlightenments are not safe from regression. By offering a radical critique of Europe's Enlightenment project from within, Horkheimer and Adorno argued that reason, which was supposed to liberate humanity, could (and had, in Europe's case) become a tool of domination and oppression.

In 1987, Jürgen Habermas wrote that an enlightenment could lead to a "counter-enlightenment" (Gegenaufklärung) or to an "enlightenment on enlightenment" (Aufklärung über Aufklärung).
