= Wickert =

Wickert is a German surname. Notable people with the surname include:

- Emilia Wickert (born 2007), German rhythmic gymnast
- Erwin Wickert (1915–2008), German diplomat
- Max Wickert (born 1938), American teacher, poet, translator, and publisher
- Tom Wickert (born 1952), American football player
- Ulrich Wickert (born 1942), German journalist and author
