= Jack Anderson (columnist) =

American newspaper columnist (1922–2005)

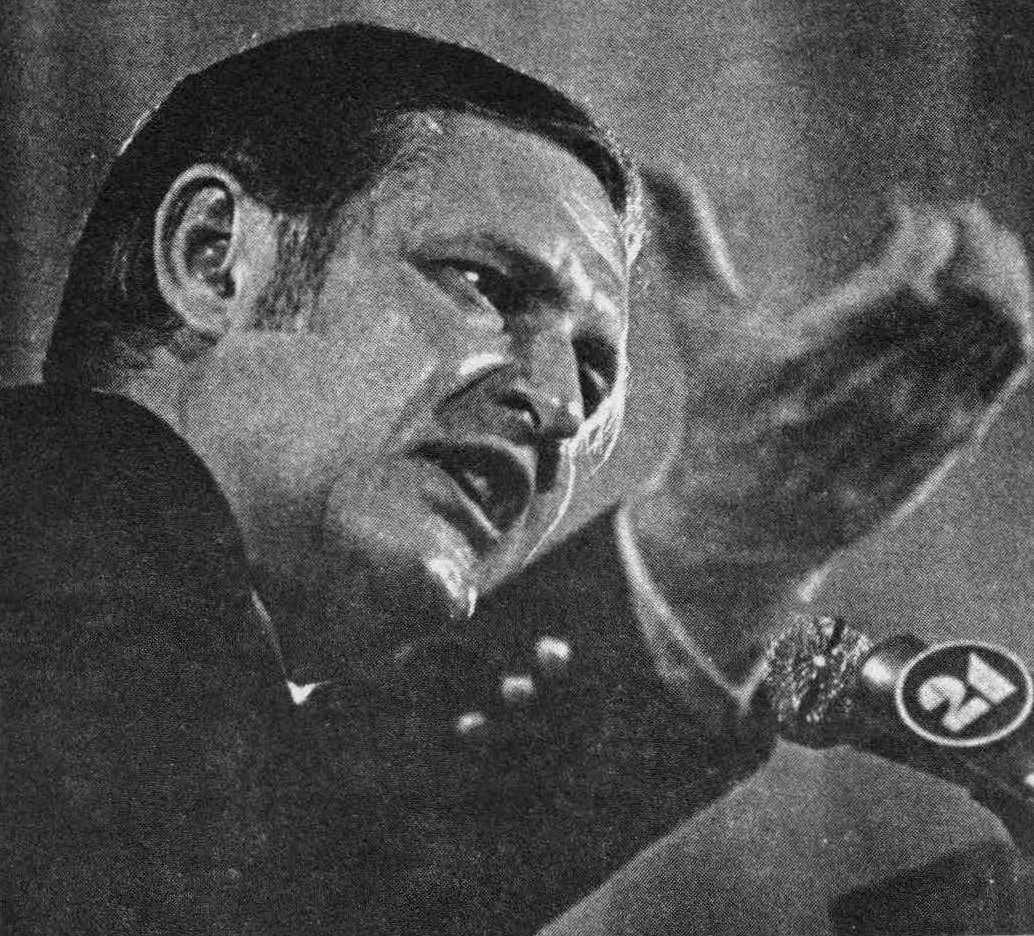
- Anderson c. 1973
- Born: Jack Northman Anderson; October 19, 1922; Long Beach, California, U.S.
- Died: December 17, 2005 (aged 83); Bethesda, Maryland, U.S.
- Occupation: Investigative journalist
- Awards: Pulitzer Prize

Jack Northman Anderson (October 19, 1922 – December 17, 2005) was an American newspaper columnist, syndicated by United Features Syndicate, considered one of the founders of modern investigative journalism. Anderson won the 1972 Pulitzer Prize for National Reporting for his investigation on secret U.S. policy decision-making between the United States and Pakistan during the Indo-Pakistani War of 1971. In addition to his newspaper career, Anderson also had a national radio show on the Mutual Broadcasting System, acted as Washington bureau chief of Parade magazine, and was a commentator on ABC-TV's Good Morning America for nine years.

Among the exposés Anderson reported were the Nixon administration's investigation and harassment of John Lennon during its fight to deport Lennon; the continuing activities of fugitive Nazi officials in South America; and the savings and loan crisis. He revealed the history of a CIA plot to assassinate Fidel Castro and was credited for breaking the story of the Iran–Contra affair under President Reagan. He said that the scoop was "spiked" because the story had become too close to President Ronald Reagan.

== Early life and career ==
Anderson was born in Long Beach, California, to Orlando and Agnes (née Mortensen) Anderson, devout members of the Church of Jesus Christ of Latter-day Saints of Swedish and Danish descent. He grew up with his family in Salt Lake City, Utah. After high school, he served two years as a missionary for the Church of Jesus Christ of Latter-day Saints in the church's Southern States Mission.

Anderson's aptitude for journalism appeared at the early age of 12 when he began writing the Boy Scouts Column for The Deseret News. He published his first articles in his local newspaper, The Murray Eagle. He edited his high school newspaper, The Granitian. He joined The Salt Lake Tribune in 1940, where his muckraking exploits included infiltrating polygamous Mormon fundamentalist sects. In 1944, he joined the United States Merchant Marine and served on cargo ships that went to New Guinea and India. In the spring of 1945, he resigned from the Merchant Marine, and became a war correspondent stationed in Chongqing, China. Shortly after World War II ended, he was drafted into the United States Army, and served until the fall of 1946 as an armed forces newsman and radio broadcaster. While in the Army, Anderson worked on the Shanghai edition of Stars and Stripes, produced by troops and XMHA, the Armed Forces' radio station. After his stint in the Army, Anderson was hired by Drew Pearson for the staff of his column, the "Merry-Go-Round". When Pearson died in 1969, Anderson inherited responsibility for this column and gave his own name to it – Washington Merry-go-Round. In its heyday, Anderson's column was the most influential and widely read in the U.S.; published in nearly a thousand newspapers, he reached an audience of 40 million people. He co-founded Citizens Against Government Waste with J. Peter Grace in 1984.

== Muckraker ==
Anderson feuded with FBI director J. Edgar Hoover in the 1950s, when he exposed the scope of the Mafia, a threat that Hoover had long downplayed. Hoover's retaliation and continual harassment lasted into the 1970s. Hoover once described Anderson as "lower than the regurgitated filth of vultures."

Anderson told his staff, "Let's do to Hoover what he does to others," and he instructed them to go through Hoover's garbage, a tactic the FBI used in its surveillance of political dissidents.

Anderson grew close to Senator Joseph McCarthy, and the two exchanged information from sources. When Pearson went after McCarthy, Anderson reluctantly followed.

In the mid-1960s Anderson exposed the corruption of Senator Thomas J. Dodd and unearthed a memo by an ITT executive admitting the company made large donations to Richard Nixon's campaign to so that Nixon would stymie anti-trust prosecution. His reporting on Nixon-ITT corruption earned him a place on the Master list of Nixon's political opponents. Anderson collaborated with Pearson on The Case Against Congress, published in 1968.

According to the Family Jewels Central Intelligence Agency documents, in 1971, during the Indo-Pakistani War, the director of the CIA, Richard Helms, had a wiretap put on Anderson's phones.

Other topics that Anderson covered included organized crime, the John F. Kennedy assassination, Ted Kennedy's role in the drowning death of a staffer at the Chappaquiddick incident, the Watergate scandal, the 1970 meeting between Elvis Presley and President Nixon, fugitive Nazis, the white supremacist organization the Liberty Lobby and other far-right organizations, the death of Howard Hughes, the ABSCAM public corruption investigation, the investigation into fugitive financier Robert Vesco, the Iran-Contra scandal, and the activities of numerous Washington agencies, elected officials, and bureaucrats.

During the 1972 presidential race, Anderson retracted a story accusing Democratic vice-presidential nominee Thomas Eagleton of multiple drunk driving arrests. But Eagleton's campaign was already severely damaged, and he was dropped from the ticket.

== Targeted for assassination ==
In 1972 Anderson was the target of an assassination plot conceived by senior White House staff. Two Nixon administration conspirators admitted under oath that they plotted to poison Anderson on orders from senior White House aide Charles Colson.

White House "plumbers" G. Gordon Liddy and E. Howard Hunt met with a CIA operative to discuss the possibilities, including drugging Anderson with LSD, poisoning his aspirin bottle, or staging a fatal mugging. The plot was aborted when the plotters were arrested for the Watergate break-in. Nixon had long been angry with Anderson. He blamed the fallout from Anderson's election-eve story about a secret loan from Howard Hughes to Nixon's brother for Nixon's loss of the 1960 presidential election.

== Project Mudhen ==
Beginning in February 1972, Anderson was the subject of a CIA project called Project Mudhen (also referred to as Operation Mudhen) aiming to find the sources of his articles. Over the course of three months, ending April 12, 1972, the CIA spied on Anderson, whose code name in the project was "Brandy". The CIA ended Mudhen after being unsuccessful at finding his sources and believing that Anderson was beginning to suspect he was being spied on by the CIA, which was able to collect a large file on his personal movements, his family, and the fact that he drove too fast occasionally. He later used documents he had been given about the project as part of a lawsuit against Richard Nixon and other government officials in 1977 claiming "that the agencies and officials committed various illegal acts and violated his constitutional rights to free speech and privacy".

== Glomar Explorer ==
Anderson has been credited as breaking the story of the Glomar Explorer, a ship constructed under tight security by the CIA to recover the lost nuclear-armed Soviet submarine K-129. Rejecting a plea from the Director of Central Intelligence William Colby to suppress the story, Anderson said he published the story because "Navy experts have told us that the sunken sub contains no real secrets and that the project, therefore, is a waste of the taxpayers' money."

== JFK conspiracy allegations ==
In November 1988, Anderson hosted a two-hour prime-time television special entitled American Expose: Who Murdered JFK? The program asserted that the assassination of John F. Kennedy was a conspiracy involving an alliance between organized crime and the Cuban government, and that the Warren Commission did not publicly reveal the true findings. Anderson's theory was based on interviews with mobster John Roselli who – prior to his death 12 years earlier – said he learned of a conspiracy through mob sources. Anderson's conversations with Roselli were re-enacted with an actor portraying Roselli. According to Anderson, Cuban leader Fidel Castro wanted Kennedy killed in retaliation for CIA plots to kill Castro, and leaders of La Cosa Nostra in the United States opposed him due to his brother Robert F. Kennedy's efforts as US Attorney General against organized crime. He said that Santo Trafficante, Carlos Marcello, and Jimmy Hoffa had the "motive and means to kill the president", and reiterated reports connecting Lee Harvey Oswald and Jack Ruby to the mob. Anderson also alleged that President Lyndon B. Johnson covered up the conspiracy for fear that public knowledge of the CIA plots would trigger war with the Soviet Union.

According to Anderson's report, private photographic analysts concluded that the shot that killed Kennedy came from the front, and that E. Howard Hunt and James Earl Ray were depicted in photographs of the "three tramps". Hunt denied the charge on the program and said he had witnesses who could prove he was not in Dallas. An Associated Press (AP) writer described it as a "bizarre allegation," to which Anderson provided "no explanation of their alleged connection".

Chicago Tribune columnist Steve Daily called the program "limp" and said Anderson's conclusion that organized crime was responsible for the assassination was based "on circumstantial evidence and the word of dead gangster Johnny Roselli." Howard Rosenberg of the Los Angeles Times wrote that it was "tawdry and strident" and said Anderson's "so-called evidence was unclear, unconvincing and untrustworthy." The Deseret News said Anderson was trying to "rewrite history".

== Capitol security stunt ==
To demonstrate the weak security within the U.S. Capitol, in 1989, Anderson brought a gun to an interview in the office of Bob Dole, Senate minority leader. He was reprimanded and Congress passed a change of rules for reporters' access to the Capitol and politicians.

== Legmen and alumni ==
Investigative reporter Les Whitten shared the byline of Anderson's column in the 1970s. Anderson also used a staff of "legmen" on his payroll, who earned little but gained valuable reporting experience. Among Anderson's legmen—reporters who went out into the field and gathered the information, forwarding it to writers such as Anderson—was Brit Hume, later a television reporter for ABC News and Washington managing editor for the Fox News Channel.

== Death and aftermath ==
Anderson was diagnosed with Parkinson's disease in 1986. In July 2004, at the age of 81, Anderson retired from his syndicated column, Washington Merry-Go-Round. He died of complications from Parkinson's disease on December 17, 2005.

In April 2006, Anderson's son Kevin said that some FBI agents had approached his mother (Jack's widow), Olivia, earlier that year to gain access to his father's files. This was purportedly in connection with the Lawrence Franklin espionage scandal. FBI spokesmen said that Anderson's archives contained classified information and confirmed that they wanted to remove the papers before they were made public. The agents claimed to be looking for documents pertaining to American Israel Public Affairs Committee (AIPAC) as part of an espionage investigation. In November 2006, the FBI quietly gave up its pursuit of the archive. The Chronicle of Higher Education reported that the archive contains Anderson's CIA file, along with information he had compiled about prominent public figures such as Richard Nixon, Ronald Reagan, Thomas Dodd, and J. Edgar Hoover.

== Writings ==
=== Books ===
Nonfiction

- McCarthyism: The Man, the Senator, the “ism” (1952)
- Washington exposé by Jack Anderson (Washington: Public Affairs Press, 1967)
- The Case Against Congress, with Drew Pearson (1969)
- American Government ...Like It Is, with Carl Kalvelage (1971)
- The Anderson Papers (1973)
- Confessions of a Muckraker, with James Boyd (1979)
- Alice in Blunderland, with John Kidner (1983)
- Fiasco, with James Boyd (1983)
- Inside the NRA: Armed and Dangerous (1996)
- Washington Money-Go-Round (1997)
- Peace, War and Politics: An Eyewitness Account, with Daryl Gibson (1999)

Fiction

- The Cambodia File, with Bill Pronzini (1983)
- Control (1989)
- Zero Time (1990)
- The Japan Conspiracy (1993)
- Millennium (1995)
- The Saudi Connection, with Robert Westbrook (2005)

=== Other ===
- Foreword to Leek, Sybil; Sugar, Bert R. (1976). The Assassination Chain. Corwin Books. ISBN 978-0498019821.
