= List of ambassadors of Germany to Romania =

The following is a partial list of German ambassadors to Romania.

== German Empire (1871–1918) ==
- 1871–1872: Joseph Maria von Radowitz
- 1872–1876: Richard Balduin von Pfuel
- 1876–1880: Friedrich Johann von Alvensleben
- 1880–1882: Ludwig von Wesdehlen
- 1882–1885: Anton Saurma von der Jeltsch
- 1885–1888: Clemens Busch
- 1888–1893: Bernhard von Bülow
- 1893–1897: Kasimir von Leyden
- 1897–1899: Hippolyt von Bray-Steinburg
- 1899–1910: Alfred von Kiderlen-Waechter
- 1910–1912: Friedrich Rosen
- 1912–1914: Julius von Waldthausen
- 1914–1916: Hilmar von dem Bussche-Haddenhausen

== Weimar Republic (1919–1933) ==
- 1921–1926: Hans Freytag
- 1926–1931: Gerhard von Mutius
- 1931–1934: Friedrich-Werner von der Schulenburg

== Nazi Germany (1933–1945) ==
- 1934–1935: Georg von Dehn-Schmidt
- 1936–1940: Wilhelm Fabricius
- 1941–1944: Manfred Freiherr von Killinger
- 1944: Carl August Clodius

== East Germany (1949–1990) ==
- 1950–1951: Jonny Löhr (Head of mission)
- 1952–1953: Georg Ulrich Handke
- 1954–1957: Werner Eggerath
- 1957–1958: Georg Stibi
- 1958–1963: Wilhelm Bick
- 1963–1964: Anton Ruh
- 1965–1970: Ewald Moldt
- 1970–1977: Hans Voß
- 1977–1984: Siegfried Bock

== West Germany (1949–1990) ==
- 1971–1976: Erwin Wickert
- 1976–1979: Richard Balken
- 1980: Michael Jovy

== Unified Germany (1990 to date) ==
- 2003–2006: Wilfried Gruber
- 2006–2009: Roland Lohkamp
- 2009–2013: Andreas von Mettenheim
- 2013–2016: Werner Hans Lauk
- 2017-2021: Cord Meier-Klodt
- 2021-present: Dr. Peer Gebauer

== See also ==
- Germany–Romania relations
