= Wilhelm von Schoen =

German diplomat (1851–1933)

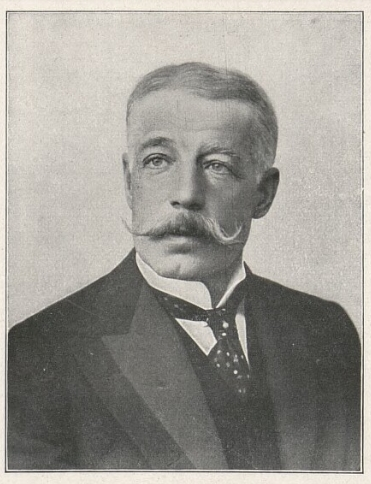

German Ambassador to France
- In office 1 July 1910 – 3 August 1914
- Monarch: Wilhelm II
- Preceded by: Hugo von Radolin
- Succeeded by: World War I

State Secretary for Foreign Affairs
- In office 26 October 1907 – 27 June 1910
- Monarch: Wilhelm II
- Chancellor: Bernhard von Bülow; Theobald von Bethmann Hollweg
- Preceded by: Heinrich von Tschirschky
- Succeeded by: Alfred von Kiderlen-Waechter

Personal details
- Born: 3 June 1851 Worms, Grand Duchy of Hesse
- Died: 24 April 1933 (aged 81) Berchtesgaden, Bavaria, Germany
- Spouse: Baroness Bertha de Groote
- Children: 2

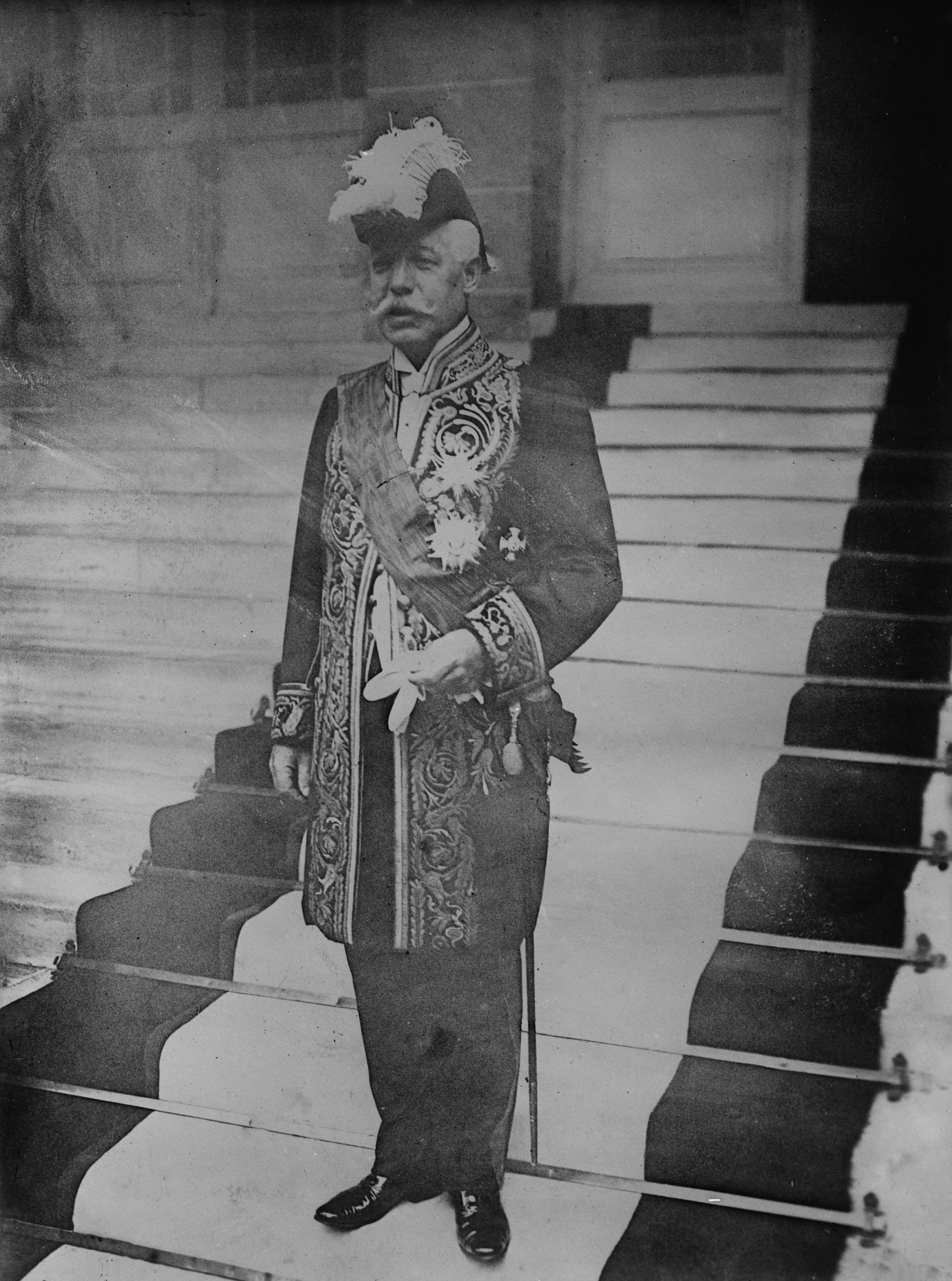
Wilhelm von Schoen as German ambassador in Paris

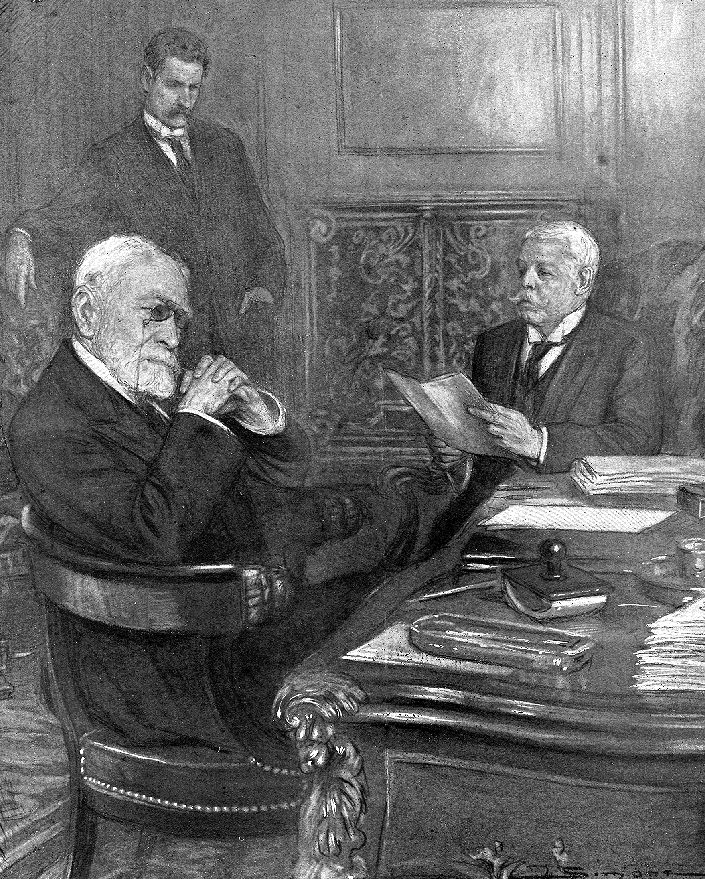
Jean-Baptiste Bienvenu-Martin (foreground), Wilhelm von Schoen (right), and Philippe Berthelot.

Wilhelm Eduard Freiherr von Schoen (Schön) (3 June 1851 – 24 April 1933) was a German diplomat. He was especially known as German ambassador in Paris at the beginning of World War I and as State Secretary for Foreign Affairs of the German Empire.

As one of Germany's leading diplomats he was appointed as Ambassador to France. He recommended for any ultimatum to Serbia to be supported in Vienna by the 'localization' of any possible conflict in the Balkans. Germany was determined to maintain the Teutonic alliance of the Central Powers at all costs and did not want an all out war. The assurance that Britain would stand by Russia and France, however, lent real fear to German foreign policy that Russian policy in the Balkans would immediately force to aid Serbia.

Schoen ensconced in the sophisticated French capital sent a telegram of 26 June announcing to Berlin that France was ready to negotiate. Bilateral talks would bring the two blocks together in peace, but by 1 August, the French were standing pat with the response they would secure the "National Interest." Schoen could not face passing on the blackmail demand that France stay neutral in Germany's planned conflict. Schoen knew he had failed when the trend in assassinations spread to Paris. In the first week of August frantic efforts were made to stop the war at the Quai d'Orsay which he visited 11 times in 7 days. Poincare had worked for appeasement or peace, but Schoen knew the Entente powers would not split. He dermurred, "My question is rather naive, for we know you have a treaty of alliance".

Schoen was born in Worms. He could speak several languages as well the German diplomatic corps, including French. His wife was a Belgian. He was distressed when he met Premier Rene Viviani by the news that the Americans were to take his embassy. Made worse by the fear of failure was the ultimatum he carried. Their solemn parting epitomised the reluctance to go to "a war to end all wars". He immediately returned to Berlin. He died in Berchtesgaden, aged 81.

== Publications ==
- Les visites de M. de Schoen au quai d'Orsay: l'Aurore, Paris 1914.
- The Guns of August", chapter 9, Barbara W. Tuchman, New York City, 1962
- Der Nationalismus im Leben der Dritten Republik, Berlin 1920. (Mitautor)
- Erlebtes: Beiträge zur politischen Geschichte der neuesten Zeit, Stuttgart 1921.
- The Memoirs of an Ambassador: A Contribution to the Political History of Modern Times. G. Allen & Unwin. 1922.
- Mémoires (1900-1914), Paris 1922.
- Deutschland und die Schuldfrage, Berlin 1924.
- Kleiner Führer durch das Berchtesgadener Land, Berchtesgaden 1925.
- The German Declaration of War on France: The Question of Telegram Mutilations. Premier Poincaré versus Ambassador von Schoen, USA 1927.
