= Franz von Lenbach =

German painter (1836–1904)

- Self-portrait (1903)
- Born: 13 December 1836; Schrobenhausen, Kingdom of Bavaria
- Died: 6 May 1904 (aged 67); Munich, Germany
- Known for: Painting

Franz Seraph Lenbach, after 1882, Ritter von Lenbach (13 December 1836 – 6 May 1904), was a German painter known primarily for his portraits of prominent personalities from the nobility, the arts, and industry. Because of his standing in society, he was often referred to as the "Malerfürst" (Painter Prince).

== Biography ==
Franz on Lenbach was born on 13 December 1836 in Schrobenhausen. His father, who originally came from South Tyrol where the family name was spelled "Lempach", was a Master Mason for Schrobenhausen, where Lenbach was born. Lenbach completed his primary education at Landsberg in 1848, then attended a business school in Landshut. From 1851 to 1852, he was apprenticed to the sculptor Anselm Sickinger in Munich. At that time, his father died and he went home to help in the family business.

He was only there a short time before beginning studies at the Augsburg University of Applied Sciences. While there, he drew and painted in his spare time, befriended Johann Baptist Hofner (1832–1913), the animal painter, and decided to become an artist. In 1854, he obtained his family's reluctant permission to study at the Academy of Fine Arts, Munich, and later took private lessons from Hermann Anschütz.

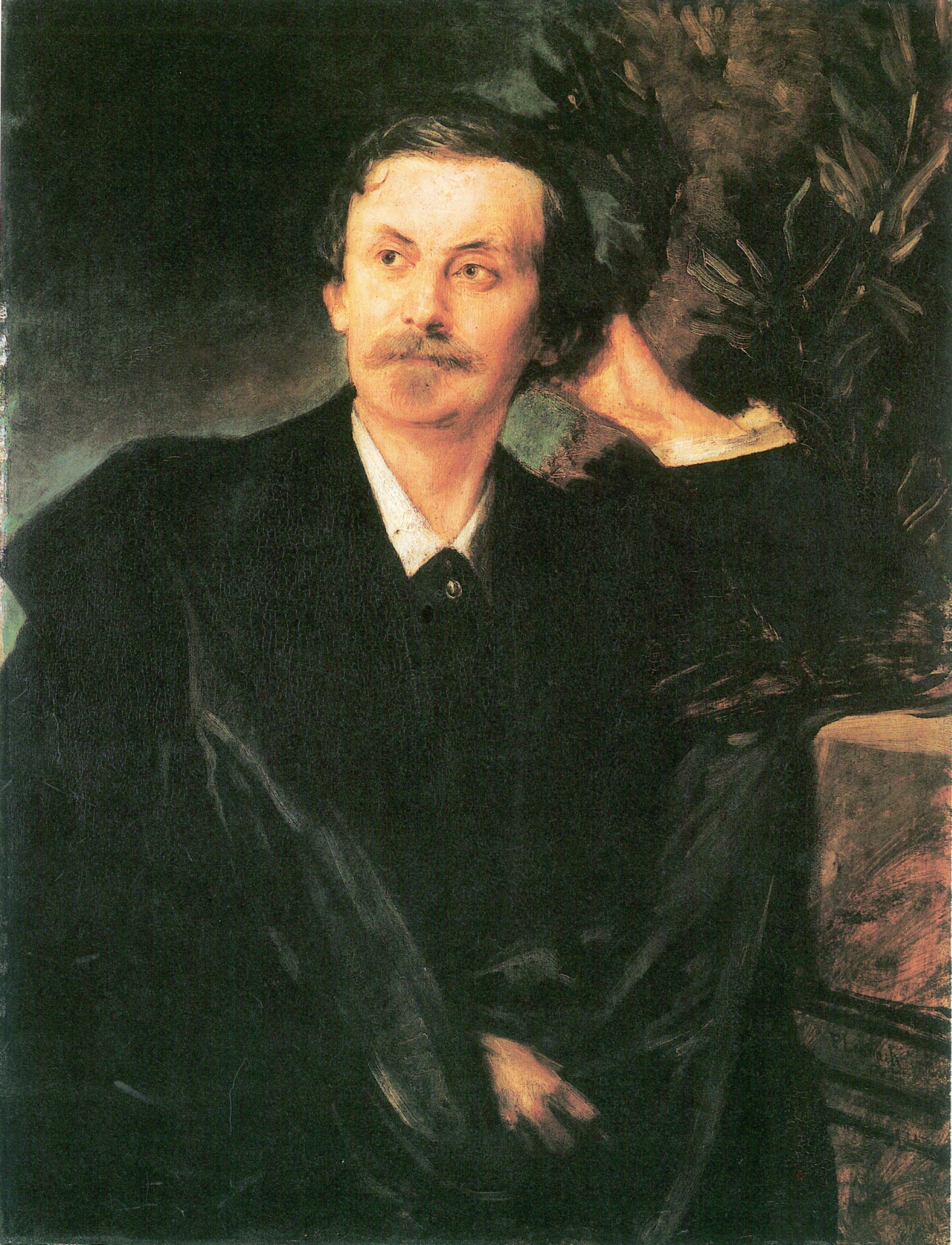
Portrait of Adolf von Schack (1875)

Lenbach was already an accomplished artist when he became the pupil of Karl von Piloty. In 1858, he was able to stage an exhibition at the Glaspalast and won a travel scholarship, which enabled him to accompany Piloty to Rome. A few works remain as the outcome of this first journey: A Peasant seeking Shelter from Bad Weather (1855), The Goatherd (1860, in the Schack Gallery, Munich) and The Arch of Titus (in the Palfy collection, Budapest). He also travelled to Paris and Brussels. It was about then that he started receiving his first portrait commissions.

On returning to Munich, he was at once called to Weimar to take the appointment of professor at the newly established Weimar Saxon Grand Ducal Art School, where he became known for taking his students on painting expeditions en plein aire. He remained for only two years, however, when he felt the need for more studies and decided to take another trip to Italy. During this time, he also found an important patron; Baron Adolf Friedrich von Schack. Through his support, Lenbach was able to leave for Italy in 1863 with a guaranteed annual income.

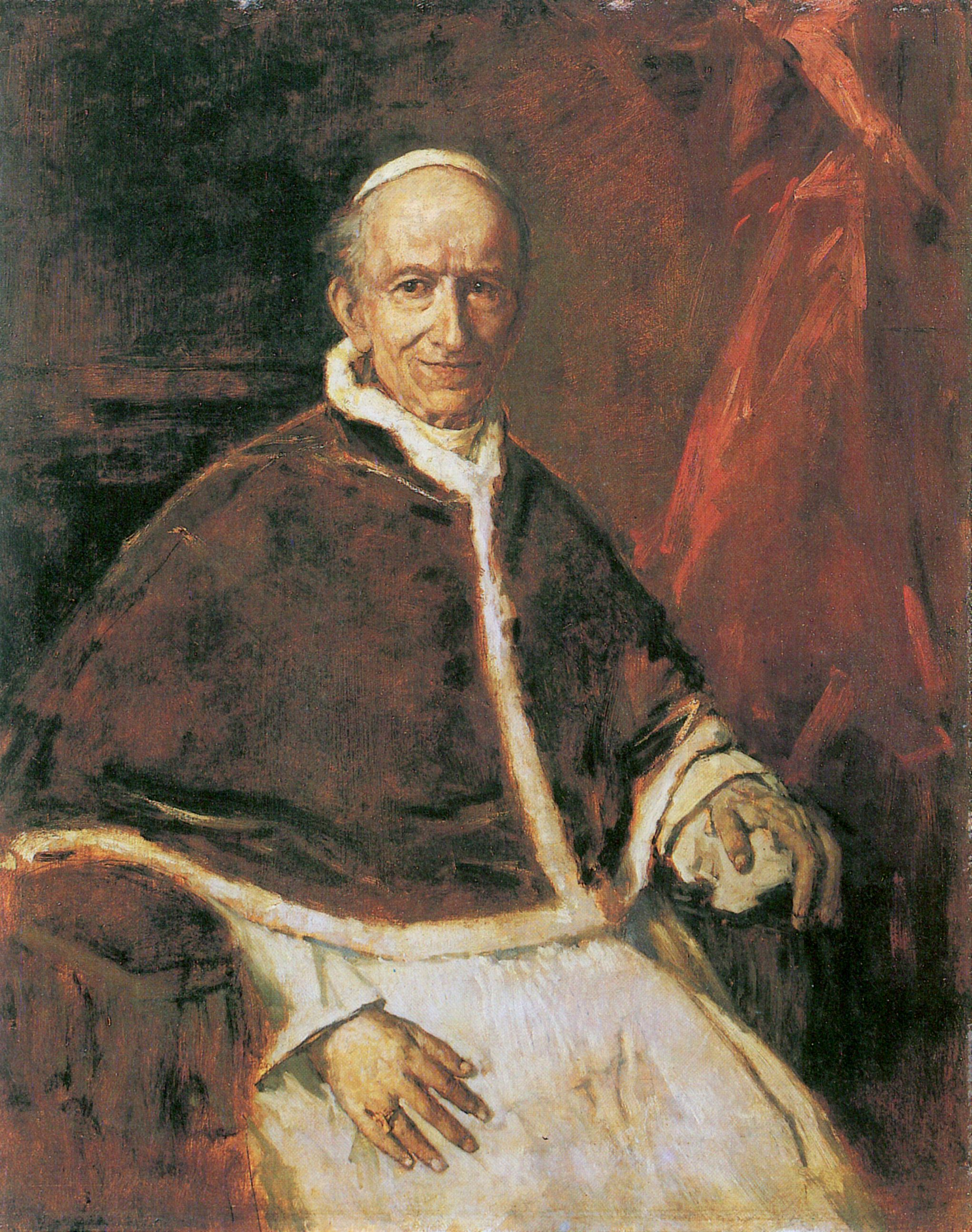
Portrait of Pope Leo XIII (c. 1885)

He returned to Munich in 1866. The following year, he won a gold medal at the Exposition Universelle and went to Spain for one year, accompanied by his student, Ernst Friedrich von Liphart, to make more copies of the Old Masters for Schack. Upon returning, his career as a portrait painter began in earnest. His breakthrough came in 1869, when he won a gold medal at the Glaspalast, despite being up against many fashionable French painters. After 1870, he began making visits to Vienna to develop a market for his paintings there, which even survived the Panic of 1873. It is also said that he travelled there frequently because he had a passion for Maria Beccadelli di Bologna, which was never returned.

From 1875 to 1876 he, Hans Makart, and other associates made a trip to Egypt, which left a deep impression in his style. In 1882, he was awarded the Order of Merit of the Bavarian Crown, which entitled him to become "Von Lenbach". The following year, he was back in Rome, where he lived in apartments at the Palazzo Borghese. One of his sitters was Clara Schumann, whose portrait he drew in pastel in 1878. In 1885, he was commissioned to do a portrait of Pope Leo XIII. As the Pope did not have time to sit for the portrait, a new technique was used to create a photographic template. He left Rome in 1887 and began building a villa in Munich. Later that year, he married Countess Magdalena Moltke.

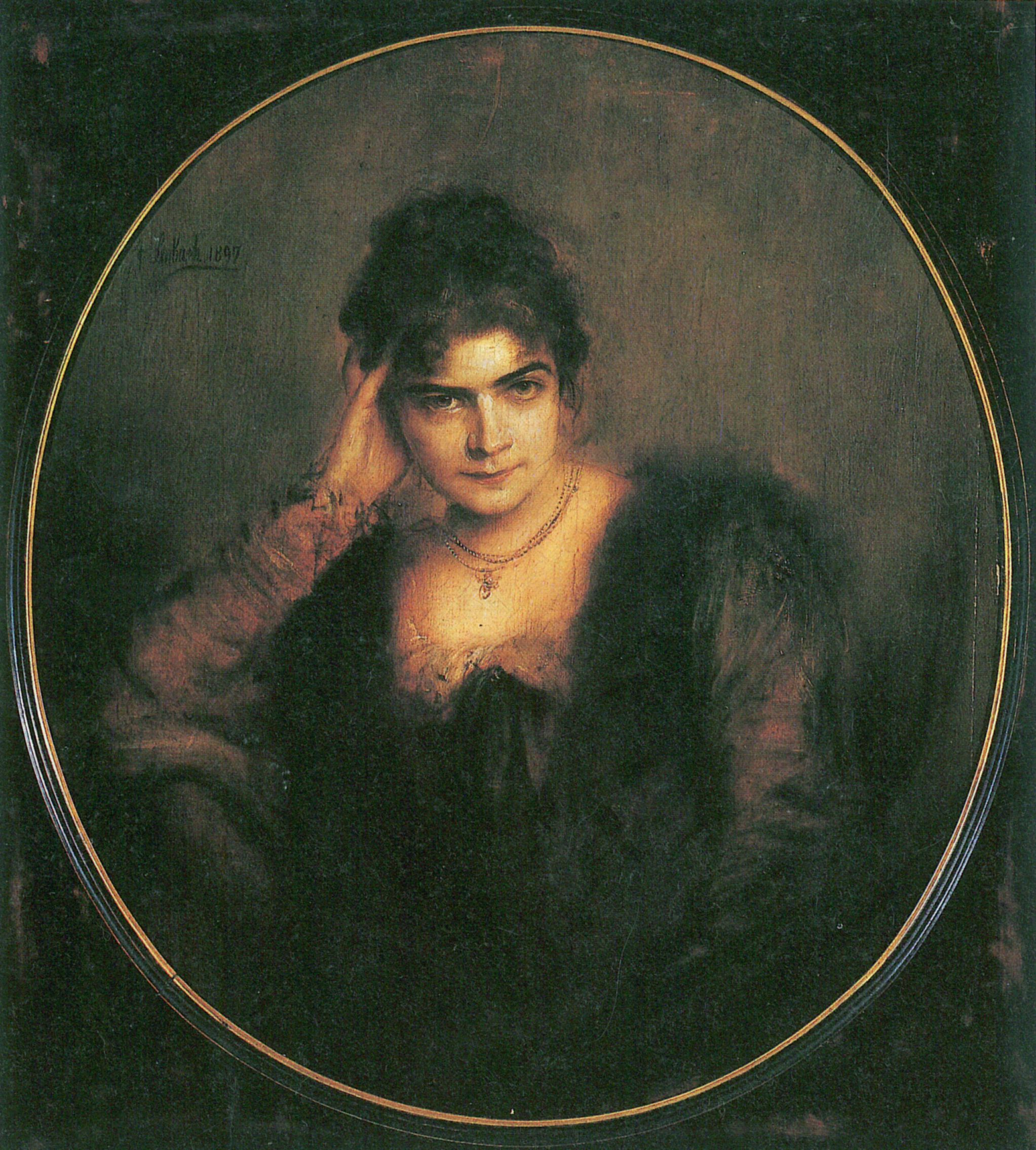
Portrait of his second wife, Charlotte (1897)

By the 1890s, he was painting almost entirely from photographs, a common practice at the time, but he also began working too fast, in an effort to create sufficient income. In 1895, a major scandal erupted when one of his assistants took unfinished paintings and sketches, had students fill in the details, and passed them off as Lenbach's work. In 1896, he and Magdalena were divorced, over suspicions of infidelity with her doctor, Ernst Schweninger, whom she did in fact later marry. Lenbach also remarried, to Charlotte von Hornstein, daughter of the composer Robert von Hornstein.

He refused to join the Munich Secession and was highly critical of the new Bavarian National Museum. He also began to paint women, almost exclusively, whereas before he had concentrated on men. Around 1900, he started to produce trading card designs for the Stollwerck chocolate company of Cologne.

In 1902, he became an honorary Knight in the Légion d'Honneur. That same year, he suffered a stroke while returning from a trip to his home town and never fully recovered. He died at his Munich villa two years later, on 6 May 1904. He was buried at the Westfriedhof and many prominent figures spoke at his funeral.

== Legacy ==
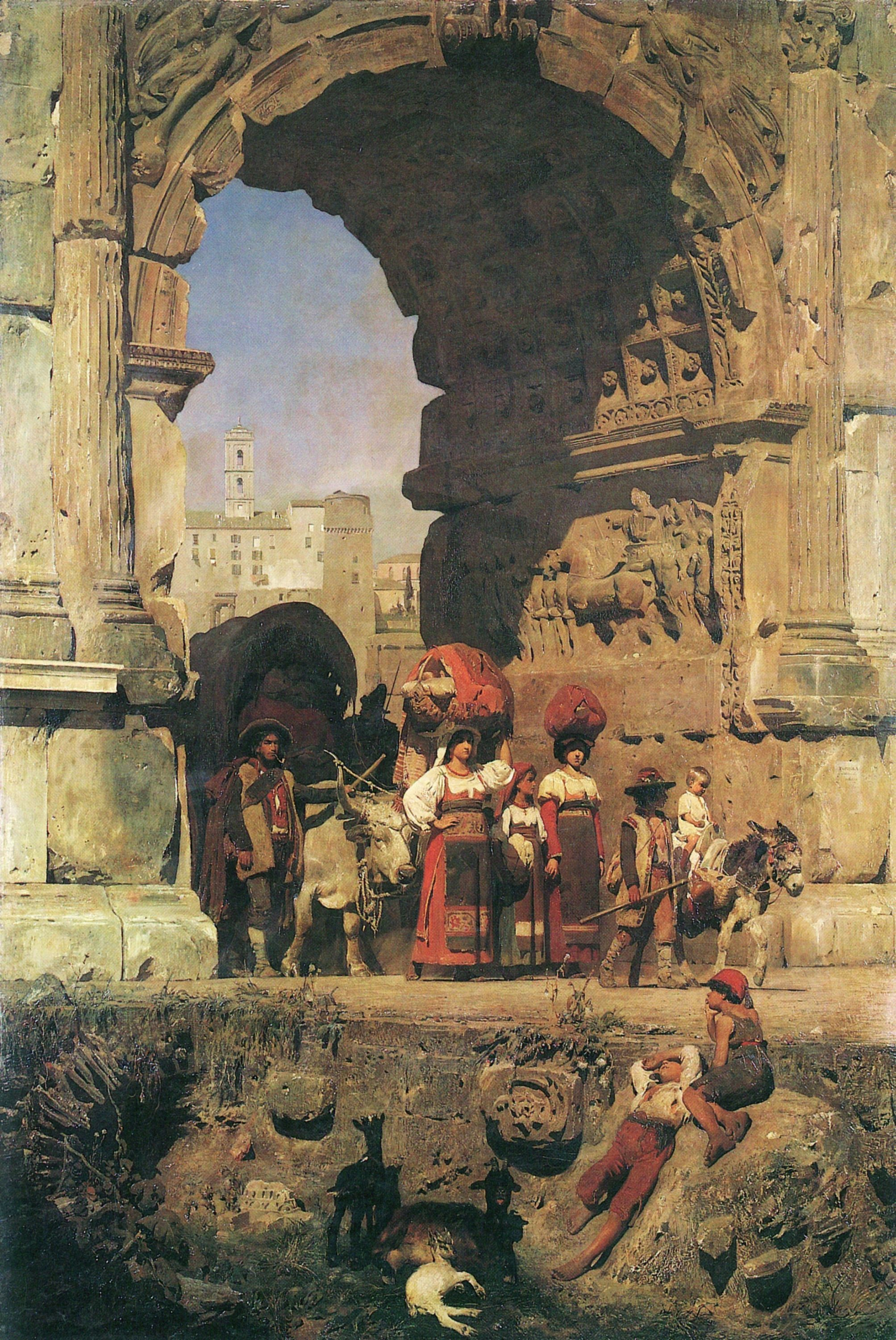
The Triumphal Arch of Titus in Rome, 1860

Some of Lenbach's paintings are now in national collections in the United Kingdom, including portraits by Lenbach of Bismarck and Gladstone in the National Galleries of Scotland and another of Gladstone in the Palace of Westminster. Others are in the Frye Art Museum in Seattle, Washington.

== Third Reich era ==
Lenbach's paintings were much prized by top Nazis and given as gifts by underlings. Goebbels gifted Hitler a Lenbach in 1936, writing in his diary, "(Hitler) is very touched and takes the greatest joy in my Lenbach". Lenbachs were also looted from Jewish collectors like the Löw-Beer family in Brněnec, Rudolf Mosse in Berlin, Sigmund Bernstein, and many others. The database of the German Lost Art Foundation lists 108 entries for Lenbach. The ERR database for objects seized in France (the "Cultural Plunder by the Einsatzstab Reichsleiter Rosenberg: Database of Art Objects at the Jeu de Paume") lists six artworks by Lenbach.

== See also ==
- Lenbachhaus

== Sources ==
- von Baranow, Sonja (2003). "Lenbach, Franz von". Grove Art Online.
