= Rolf Friedemann Pauls =

German diplomat (1915–2002)

Rolf Pauls
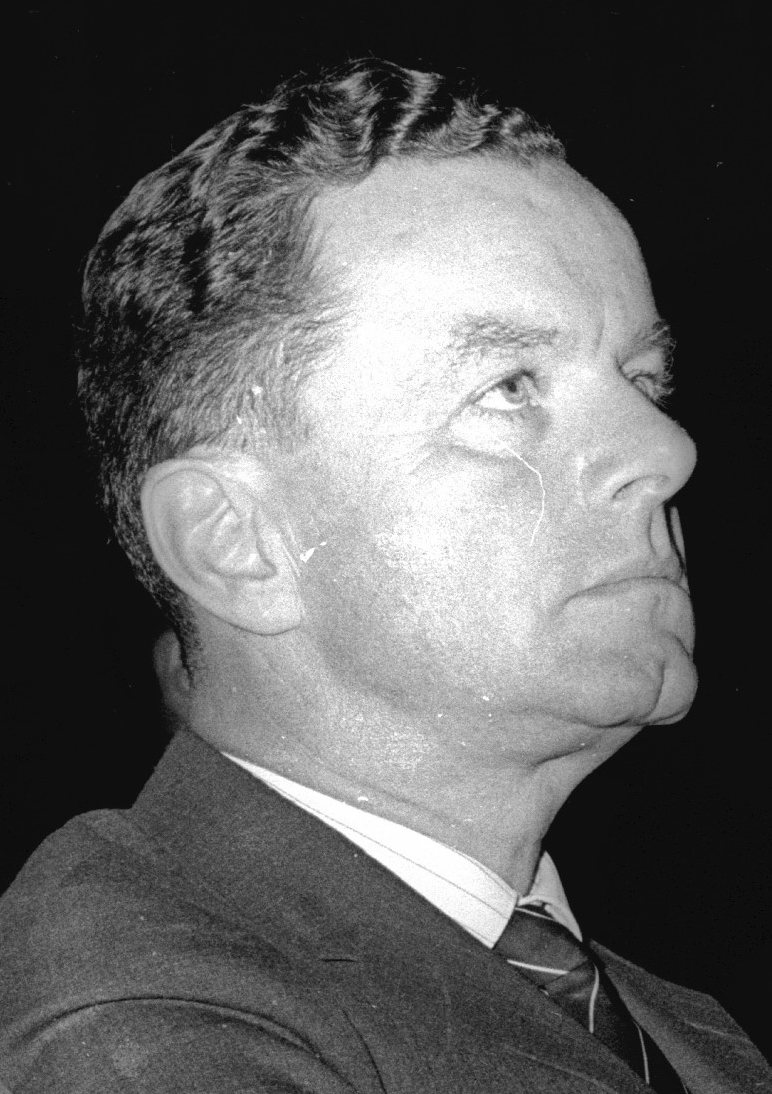

West German Ambassador to NATO
- In office 1976–1980
- President: Walter Scheel; Karl Carstens
- Preceded by: Franz Krapf
- Succeeded by: Hans-Georg Wieck

West German Ambassador to China
- In office 1973–1976
- President: Gustav Heinemann; Walter Scheel
- Preceded by: Heinrich Röhreke
- Succeeded by: Erwin Wickert

West German Ambassador to the United States
- In office 1968–1973
- President: Heinrich Lübke; Gustav Heinemann
- Preceded by: Karl Heinrich Knappstein
- Succeeded by: Berndt von Staden

West German Ambassador to Israel
- In office 1965–1968
- President: Heinrich Lübke
- Preceded by: None
- Succeeded by: Erwin Wickert

Personal details
- Born: 26 August 1915 Eckartsberga, Province of Saxony, Prussia, German Empire
- Died: 4 May 2002 (aged 86) Bonn, Germany
- Civilian awards: Knight Commander's Cross of the Order of Merit (1966)

Military service
- Allegiance: Germany
- Branch/service: German Army
- Years of service: 1934–1945
- Rank: Major
- Battles/wars: World War II
- Military awards: Knight's Cross; Iron Cross 1st Class; Iron Cross 2nd Class

Rolf Friedemann Pauls (26 August 1915 – 4 May 2002) was a German diplomat. He was the first ambassador of the Federal Republic of Germany to Israel, from 1965 to 1968, and was German Ambassador to the United States from 1968 to 1973.

== Life ==
Rolf Friedemann Pauls was born in 1915 in Eckartsberga the son of a Protestant clergyman. He graduated from the Naumburg Domgymnasium in 1934.

He was a career officer in the infantry of the Wehrmacht. Due to a serious injury, suffered as a company commander in Russia, he lost his left arm. Before he received a General Staff Officer Course, in 1942, he was the military attaché in Ankara, Turkey. In 1944, he was on the staff of the 363rd Volksgrenadier Division. In December 1944, Paul was awarded the Knight's Cross.

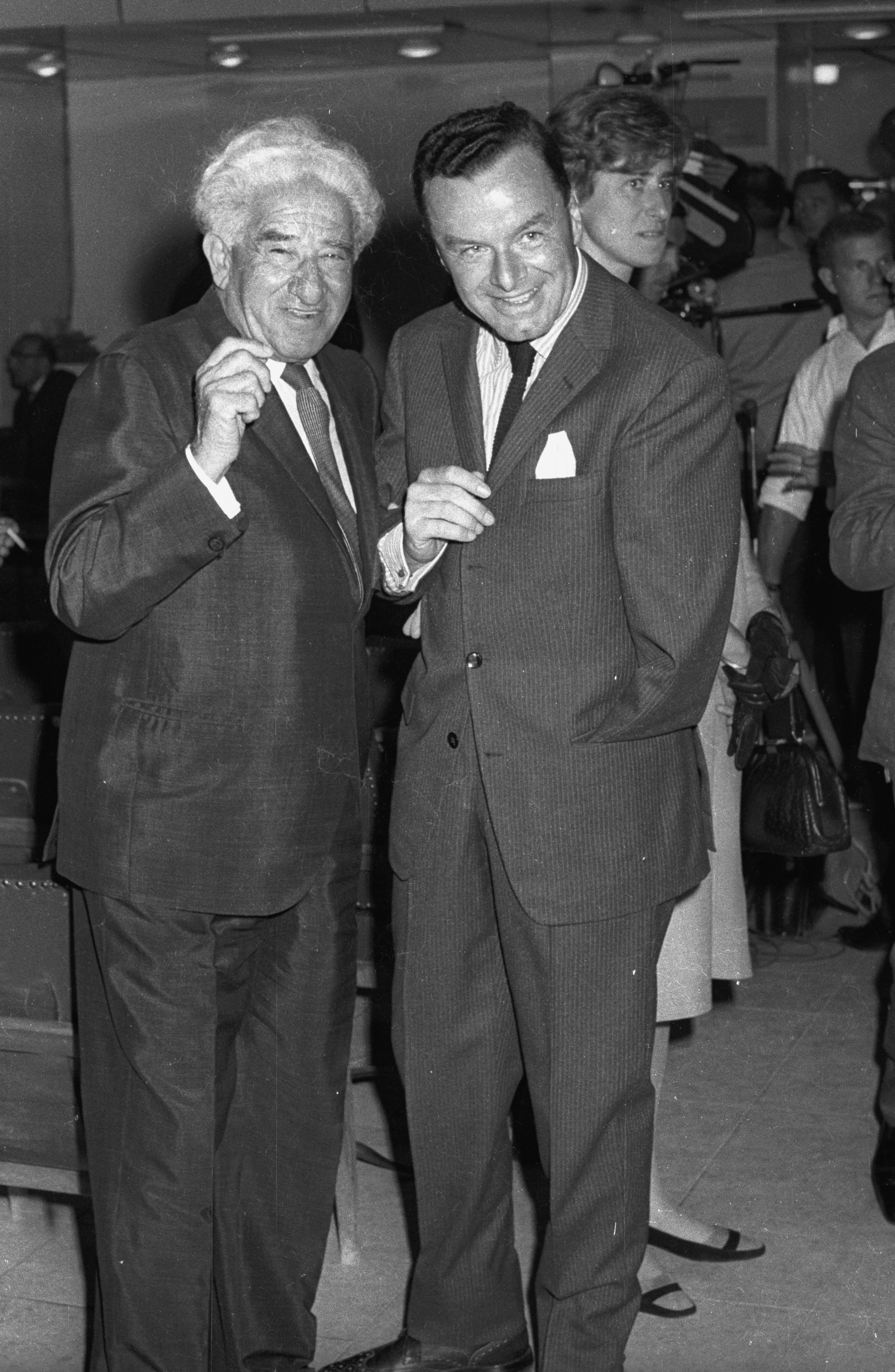
Pauls (right) speaking with Meyer Weisgal on the occasion of Konrad Adenauer's visit in Israel in 1966

According to a later report of General Hans Speidel, Rolf Friedemann Pauls was in the plans to assassinate Hitler on 20 July 1944, and was only on the basis of silence by others that he escaped arrest.

After the end of World War II in 1946, he studied law, graduating with a doctorate on the political system of the Bonn Basic Law in 1949. Before Pauls began to act as a diplomat in the Foreign Service, he worked at the Federal Chancellery, at the junction of the Allied High Commission as a personal assistant to Walter Hallstein, State Secretary and Vice Consul in Luxembourg.

He was married twice and had three sons.

== Ambassador ==
In establishing diplomatic relations between the Federal Republic of Germany and the State of Israel (only about 20 years after the Shoah) of parts of Israeli society, and his inauguration on 19 August 1965, was accompanied by violent counter-demonstrations. In addition to that of Pauls because of his past as an officer of the armed forces of Nazi Germany in World War II, where he was awarded the Knight's Cross of the Iron Cross, and as deputy military attaché at the German Embassy in Turkey, also during the period of National Socialism of the Israeli public appeared inappropriate for this office. But his three-year tenure as the first Ambassador of the Federal Republic of Germany in Israel was generally judged as successful.

Pauls was also Ambassador of the Federal Republic of Germany to the United States from 1968 to 1973, the People's Republic of China from 1973 to 1976, and to NATO from 1976 to 1980. From 1956 to 1960 he served as Counsellor in the United States, and from 1960 to 1963 he was Deputy Head of Mission in Greece. From 1963 to 1965, he was a department manager at the headquarters in Bonn.

== Works ==
- Die atlantische Allianz: Zukunftsaufgaben, Möglichkeiten, Gefährdungen, J. P. Bachem, 1982, ISBN 978-3-7616-0662-9
- Rettet uns die Rüstungspolitik? Edition Interfrom, 1982, ISBN 978-3-7201-5152-8
- Deutschlands Standort in der Welt: Beobachtungen eines Botschafters, Seewald Verlag, 1984, ISBN 978-3-512-00693-7
