= Erwin Wickert =

German diplomat and writer (1915–2008)

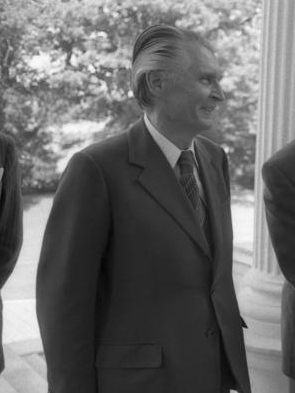
- Erwin Wickert

6th German Ambassador to China
- In office 1976–1980
- Preceded by: Rolf Friedemann Pauls
- Succeeded by: Per Fischer

2nd German Ambassador to Romania
- In office 1971–1976
- Preceded by: Bernhard von Bülow

Personal details
- Born: 7 January 1915 Bralitz, Brandenburg, German Empire
- Died: 26 March 2008 (aged 93) Remagen, Rhineland-Palatinate, Germany
- Party: Nazi Party (1939–1945)
- Spouse: Ingeborg Weides
- Relations: Ulrich Wickert (son); Emily Wood (granddaughter)
- Education: B.A., economics and political science (1936) – Dickinson College; Ph.D., philosophy (1939) – University of Heidelberg
- Occupation: diplomat

Erwin Wickert (7 January 1915 – 26 March 2008) was a German diplomat who, during the 1970s, served as the ambassador to Romania and China.

== Early life and education ==
Born in Bralitz and raised in Wittenberg, Wickert applied to join the Sturmabteilung at the age of 18 before ultimately enrolling at the University of Berlin in 1934, where he studied philosophy. The following year, in 1935, he won a scholarship to Dickinson College in Carlisle, Pennsylvania, and transferred there to complete his studies, graduating with a Bachelor of Arts in economics and political science in 1936.

Wickert spent the year following graduation traveling the United States and Asia, before returning to Germany. During his travels, he worked odd jobs, including as a waiter in San Francisco and for a travel agency in New York City. In 1939 he completed a doctorate in philosophy at Heidelberg University.

== Career ==
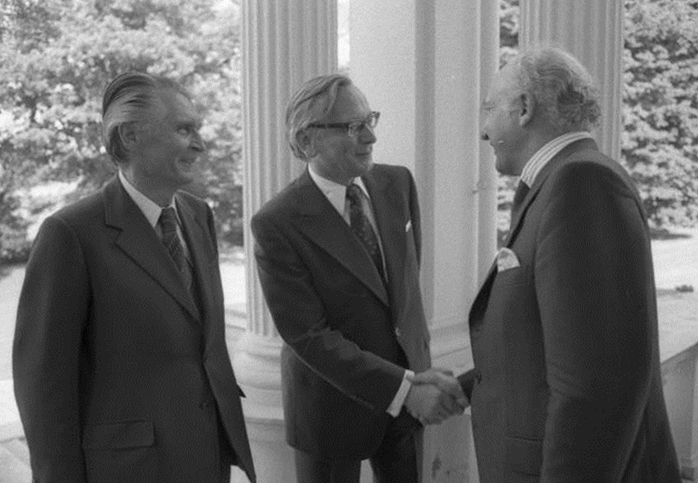
Erwin Wickert (far left) in 1976

By September 1939, Wickert had joined the Nazi Party and was hired by the German foreign ministry. That year he was appointed "radio attaché" at the German consulate in Shanghai, where he was responsible for managing the German propaganda station XGRS. Towards the end of the war he was reassigned to Tokyo, Japan.

From 1947 Wickert worked as a freelance writer in Heidelberg. Upon the sovereignty of the Federal Republic of Germany in 1955, Wickert resumed working for the foreign ministry, holding posts in Paris, London, and a domestic assignment in Bonn. From 1971 to 1976 he served as German ambassador to Romania and, from 1976 to 1980, as ambassador to the People's Republic of China.

Wickert retired in 1980. Shortly after, he returned to Dickinson College for the first time since his graduation 44 years earlier and led a question-and-answer session at the college's Memorial Hall.

During his life, Wickert wrote more than a dozen fiction and non-fiction books. In 1998 he edited the diaries of John Rabe.

== Personal life ==
In 1939 Wickert married Ingeborg Weides, with whom he had two sons and one daughter. Wickert was the father of the German journalist Ulrich Wickert and grandfather of actress Emily Wood.
