= Alfred von Kiderlen-Waechter =

German diplomat and politician (1852–1912)

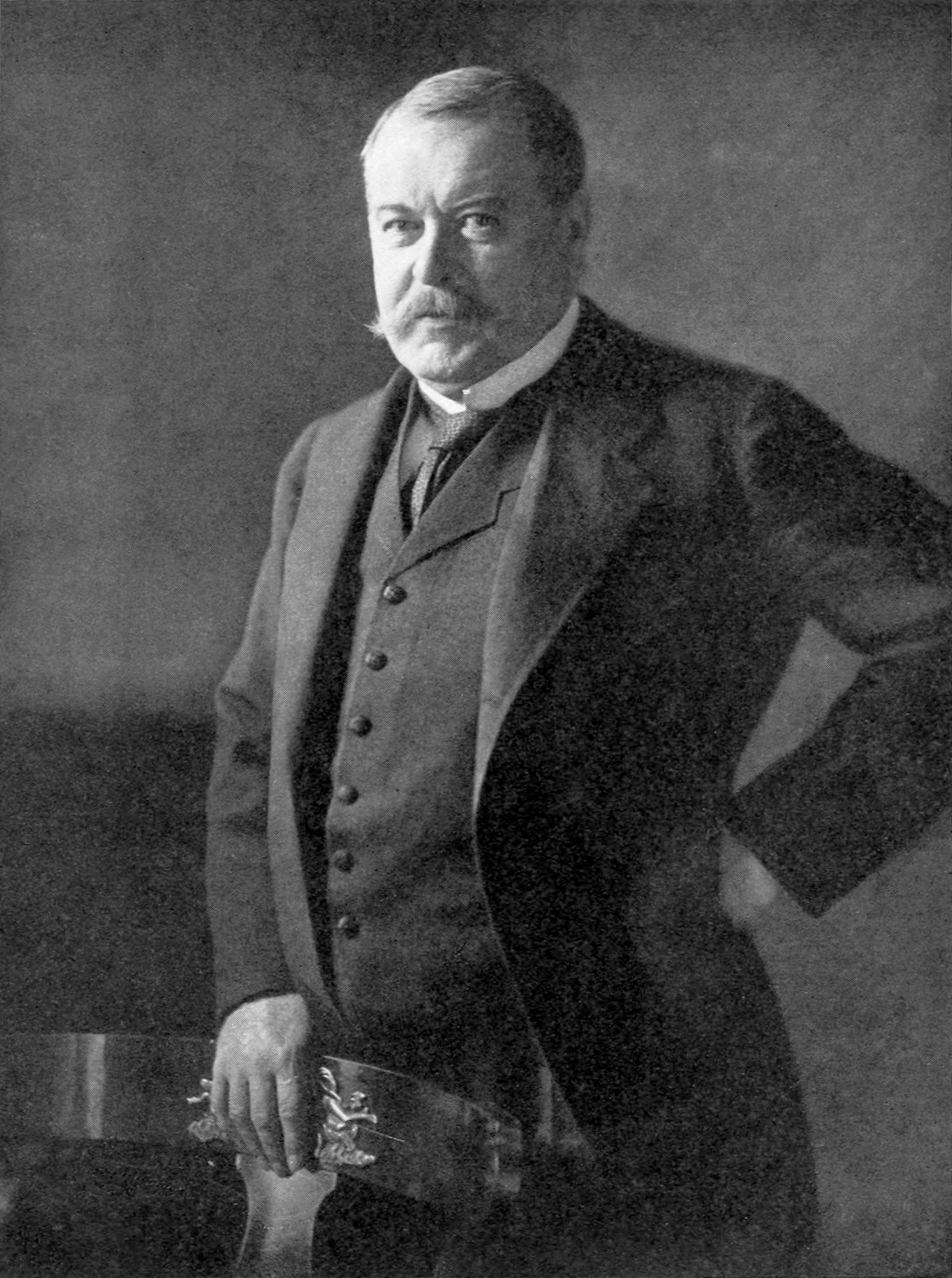

State Secretary for Foreign Affairs
- In office 27 June 1910 – 30 December 1912
- Monarch: Wilhelm II
- Chancellor: Theobald von Bethmann Hollweg
- Preceded by: Wilhelm von Schoen
- Succeeded by: Gottlieb von Jagow

German Minister to Romania
- In office 21 January 1900 – June 1910
- Preceded by: Hippolyt von Bray-Steinburg
- Succeeded by: Friedrich Rosen

Personal details
- Born: 10 July 1852 Stuttgart, Kingdom of Württemberg
- Died: 30 December 1912 (aged 60) Stuttgart, German Empire
- Party: Independent
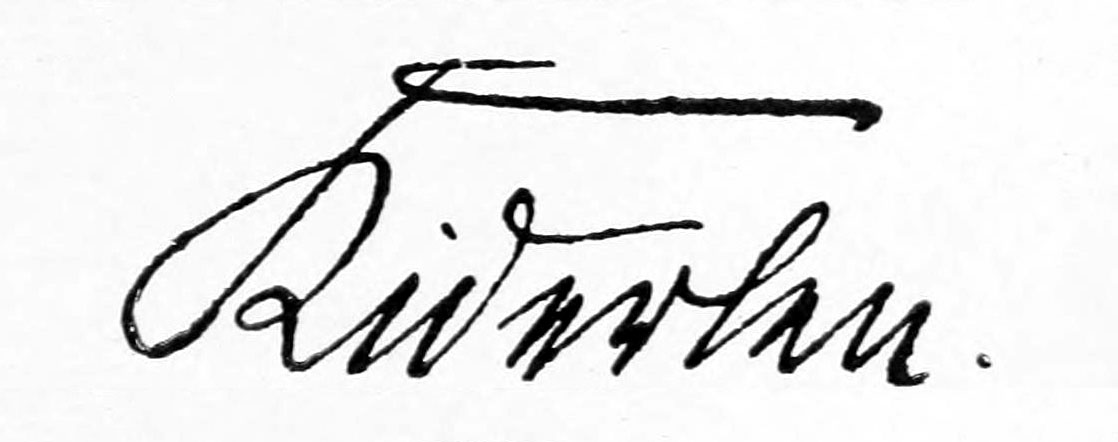
- Signature

Alfred von Kiderlen-Waechter (né Alfred Kiderlen; 10 July 1852 – 30 December 1912) was a German diplomat and politician who served as Secretary of State and head of the Foreign Office from June 1910 to December 1912. He is best known for his reckless role in the Agadir Crisis in 1911, when France militarily expanded its control of Morocco. He demanded compensation in an aggressive saber-rattling fashion, sent a warship to the scene and whipped up nationalist sentiment inside Germany. A compromise was reached with France, which took control of Morocco and gave Germany a slice of the French Congo. However, the British were angry at German aggressiveness and talked of war. The episode, although small itself, permanently soured prewar relations between Berlin and London.

== Life and career ==
The son of a banker from Wurttemberg, Robert Kiderlen, and Baroness Marie von Waechter, he was born in Stuttgart. His father was elevated to the personal nobility in 1852. In 1868, Alfred's mother, Marie Kiderlen, and her children, Alfred, Sarah and Johanna, were elevated to the hereditary nobility with the name von Kiderlen-Waechter, combining the names and coats of arms of the Kiderlen and Waechter families. His name is occasionally spelled Kiderlen-Wächter, but the correct spelling is Kiderlen-Waechter.

Kiderlen-Waechter fought as a volunteer in the Franco-German War (1870–1871) and then studied at different universities and retained throughout his subsequent career a good deal of the jovial manner of a German student (burschikos). Following studies of law, he joined the foreign office in 1879. Some years later, he accompanied the emperor to Russia, Sweden and Denmark. He was minister in the free city of Hamburg in 1894 and was a diplomat stationed in Copenhagen, St. Petersburg, Paris and Constantinople. He served as envoy to Copenhagen from 1895 to 1896. Later still he was transferred to Bucharest, where he spent ten years.

In Romania he gathered a deep knowledge of Eastern European politics, which led to a temporary appointment as chief at the foreign office, and he acted also as ambassador at Constantinople during the illness of the actual ambassador. He negotiated the construction of the Baghdad Railway. In 1908, he was appointed by von Bülow as Deputy Secretary of Foreign Affairs, and returned to Berlin. He played a central role during the Bosnia Crisis. After badly misunderstanding France and Britain and recklessly stirring up German nationalists with his aggressiveness, he negotiated an agreement with France during the Second Morocco Crisis over Agadir in 1911.

After Chancellor Bernhard von Bülow resigned in November 1909, Kiderlen-Waechter became Secretary of State and worked closely with Chancellor Theobald von Bethmann Hollweg on the protracted negotiations with the Triple Entete. Kiderlen-Waechter conducted negotiations in 1911 during the Agadir Crisis and was severely criticised both at home and abroad for his provocative attitude in the Panther incident, which had triggered it. His attempts to reach an understanding with other great powers largely failed. He endeavored to make a friend of Russia.

Kiderlen-Waechter died in Stuttgart in 1912. His personal papers are held in the Manuscripts and Archives division of the Sterling Memorial Library at Yale University.
