= Sechserpack =

- Country of origin: Germany

Sechserpack is a German television comedy sketch show that was first shown on Sat.1 between 2003 and 2009.

== Overview ==
Each episode features numerous short sketches, all with a common theme. The cast consisted of the sextet Emily Wood, Mirco Reseg, Thomas Held, Hanno Friedrich, Shirin Soraya and Nina Vorbrodt, hence the name of the show. Several of the sketches featured recurring characters, including a female sergeant major who often orders one of her men to give a definition of a particular episode's theme.

== Music ==
The show's theme music is Five Get Over Excited by The Housemartins.

== See also ==
- List of German television series
