= Maria Beccadelli di Bologna =

Italian aristocrat

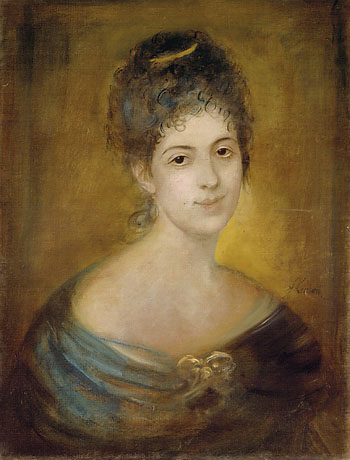
Maria Beccadelli di Bologna, portrait by Franz von Lenbach, 1873

Maria Beccadelli di Bologna, Marchesa di Altavilla, Principessa di Camporeale (6 February 1848, Naples – 20 January 1929, Rome), married Princess Maria von Bülow, was first married to Count Karl von Dönhoff they later got divorced and she became the wife of Prince Bernhard von Bülow, the Chancellor of Germany.

== Early life ==
She was the daughter of Domenico Beccadelli di Bologna (1826–1863), Principe di Camporeale, and Laura, née Acton. After her father died, her mother married the Italian prime minister Marco Minghetti and played a central role in Italian and German aristocracy.

== Personal life ==
Maria began calling herself Marie after her marriage to the Prussian diplomat Karl August, Count of Dönhoff. They married on 15 May 1867 in Lugano, but were divorced in 1882 and the marriage annulled by the Pope in 1884. They were the parents of:

- Countess Eugenie von Dönhoff (1868–1946), who married Nikolaus Heinrich Viktor von Wallwitz.
- Count Siegfried von Dönhoff (1871–1945)

On 9 January 1886 in Vienna, she married Bernhard, Prince of Bülow, later Chancellor of the German Empire. She became a confidant of the Prussian Crown Princess Victoria.
