= Emily Wood =

German actress

Emily Wood (October 11, 1978) is a German actress.

== Life and career ==
Wood became known through her performances in the Sat.1-comedy series Sechserpack. She also appeared in Alpha Team, Großstadtrevier, Der Ermittler and Schwarz greift ein, and as a guest in the Sat.1 show Clueless Genius: The Comedy Arena. After moving to Germany as a child (Düsseldorf, Frankfurt and Hamburg), she now lives in London, England.

Wood is the niece of the German journalist Ulrich Wickert and granddaughter of Erwin Wickert.
