= Mirco Reseg =

German actor and comedian

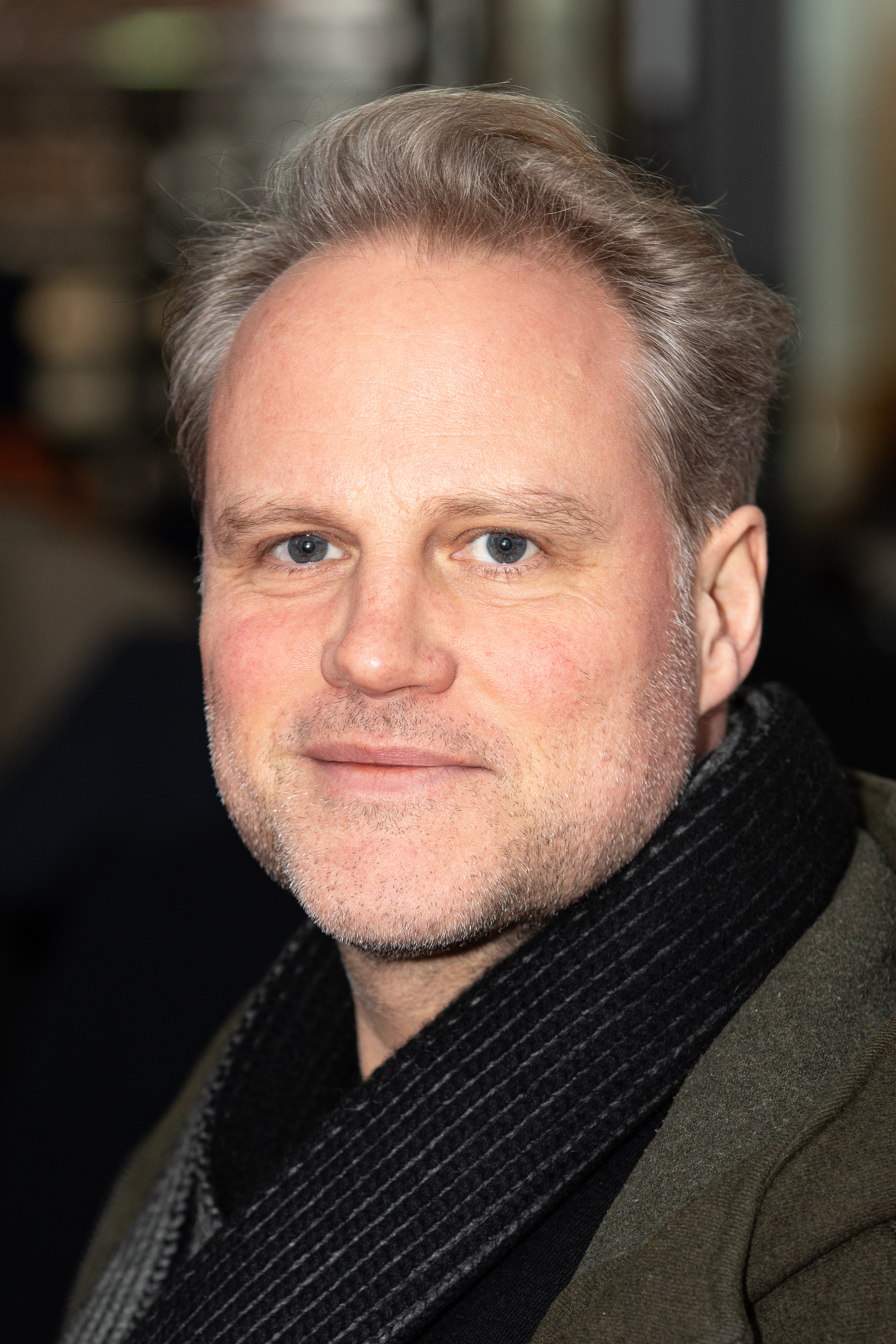
Mirco Reseg (2020)

Mirco Reseg (born October 28, 1972 in Düsseldorf) is a German actor and comedian.

== Life ==
Reseg attended the Gerhart-Hauptmann-Realschule in Hanover. He has previously worked in television productions such as Sechserpack, Cologne P.D. and Lindenstraße. Reseg currently lives in Hamburg-Eimsbüttel.
