= Algeciras Town Hall =

Municipal building in Algeciras, Spain

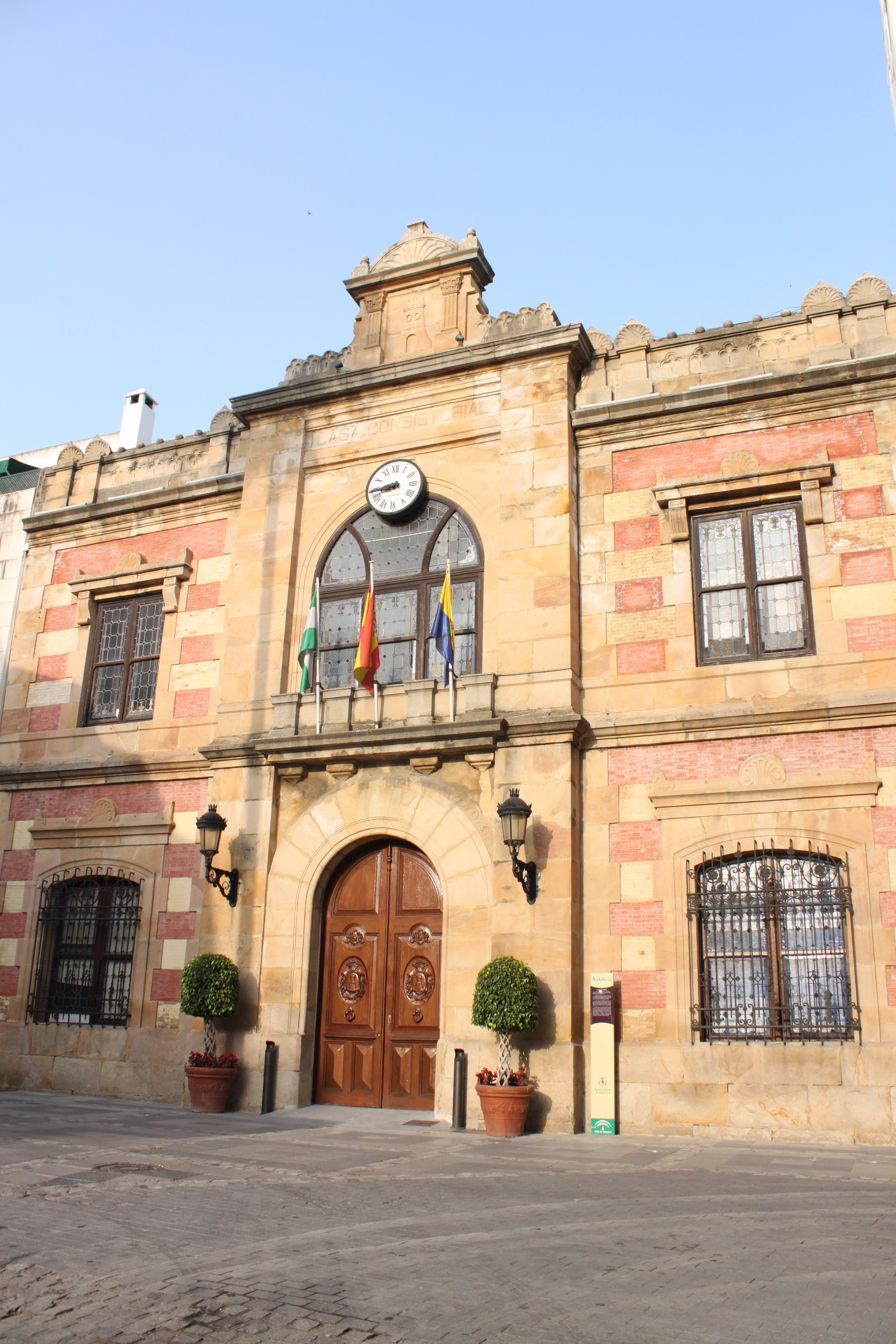
Casa Consistorial de Algeciras

Algeciras Town Hall (Spanish: Casa Consistorial de Algeciras) is the town hall of Algeciras, Spain, at number 12 Calle Alfonso XI, also known as Calle Convento. The building was completed in 1897 and today houses much of City Council, including the offices of the Mayor, Secretary, and Press Office.

== Background ==
The Algeciras City Council was established in 1755 after a long legal battle for the emancipation of San Roque. The current Town Hall, designed by Amadeo Rodriguez, commenced on May 14, 1892, and was completed on August 15, 1897.

== Architecture ==
The final work lacks the elegance with which it was conceived and appears heavy and robust, consisting of two bodies and displaying the coat of arms of the city. The facade is made of sandstone with elements of red brick buildings.

Inside the two floors are articulated around two central courtyards. The plenary hall has interesting decor tiles made during the tenure of Mayor Emilio Morillas in the colours of the city, and several yellow and blue mosaics depicting typical places. There is also a mosaic commemorating the Algeciras Conference of 1906. In the late twentieth century the building was extended on the left through a modernist construction of little architectural value.
