= Bernhard von Bülow =

Chancellor of the German Empire from 1900 to 1909

His Serene Highness Bernhard von Bülow Prince of Bülow
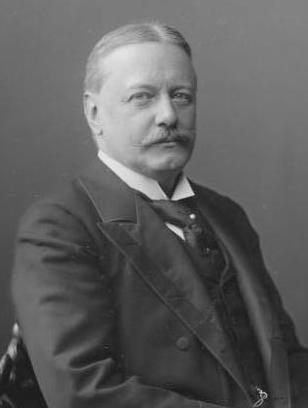
- Bernhard von Bülow in 1899

Chancellor of the German Empire
- In office 17 October 1900 – 14 July 1909
- Monarch: Wilhelm II
- Deputy: Arthur von Posadowsky-Wehner; Theobald von Bethmann Hollweg
- Preceded by: Chlodwig, Prince of Hohenlohe-Schillingsfürst
- Succeeded by: Theobald von Bethmann Hollweg

State Secretary for Foreign Affairs
- In office 20 October 1897 – 16 October 1900
- Chancellor: Chlodwig zu Hohenlohe-Schillingsfürst
- Preceded by: Adolf Marschall von Bieberstein
- Succeeded by: Oswald von Richthofen

Minister of Foreign Affairs of Prussia
- In office 20 October 1897 – 14 July 1909
- Prime Minister: Chlodwig zu Hohenlohe-Schillingsfürst; Himself
- Preceded by: Adolf Marschall von Bieberstein
- Succeeded by: Theobald von Bethmann Hollweg

Personal details
- Born: Bernhard Heinrich Karl Martin von Bülow; 3 May 1849 Klein-Flottbeck, Duchy of Holstein, German Confederation
- Died: 28 October 1929 (aged 80) Rome, Italy
- Spouse: Maria Beccadelli di Bologna
- Education: University of Lausanne; University of Berlin; University of Leipzig; University of Greifswald
- Bernhard von Bülow's voice Recorded 1917

Bernhard Heinrich Karl Martin, Prince of Bülow (German: Bernhard Heinrich Karl Martin Fürst von Bülow [fɔn ˈbyːloː]; 3 May 1849 – 28 October 1929) was a German politician who served as the imperial chancellor of the German Empire and minister-president of Prussia from 1900 to 1909. A fervent supporter of Weltpolitik, Bülow devoted his chancellorship to transforming Germany into a global power. Despite presiding over sustained economic growth and major scientific breakthroughs within his country, his government's bellicose foreign policy did much to antagonize the French Third Republic, the United Kingdom of Great Britain and Ireland and the Russian Empire, thereby significantly contributing to the outbreak of World War I.

Born into a prominent family of Danish-German aristocrats, Bülow entered the German foreign service after his father, Bernhard Ernst von Bülow, was appointed foreign secretary in Otto von Bismarck's government. He held several diplomatic posts, including German ambassador to Rome, before being appointed foreign secretary in 1897 by Wilhelm II. Three years later, he was appointed chancellor following the resignation of the Prince of Hohenlohe.

As chancellor, Bülow promoted cautious and conservative domestic policies while pursuing an ambitious and expansionist policy in foreign affairs. His open challenge to France's growing control over Morocco sparked the First Moroccan Crisis, which aggravated the French and the British and helped strengthen the Entente Cordiale. In 1908, Wilhelm's indiscreet remarks were published during the Daily Telegraph Affair, causing significant damage to German foreign relations and the Kaiser's prestige. Bülow was blamed for failing to prevent the blunder and, having lost the support of both the Kaiser and the Reichstag, he resigned in 1909 and was succeeded by Theobald von Bethmann Hollweg.

Bülow moved to Rome after his resignation. He came out of retirement in late 1914 to serve as interim ambassador to Italy, but was unable to bring King Victor Emmanuel III to the side of the Central Powers. Bülow died in Rome in 1929 at the age of 80.

== Early life ==
He was born at Klein-Flottbeck, Holstein (now part of Altona, Hamburg). His father, Bernhard Ernst von Bülow, was a Danish and German statesman and member of an old House of Bülow, while his mother was a wealthy heiress, Louise Victorine Rücker (1821–1894). His brother, Major-General Karl Ulrich von Bülow, was a cavalry commander during World War I. Bülow attributed his grasp of English and French to having learnt it from governesses as a young child. His father spoke French, and his mother spoke English, as was common in Hamburg society.

In 1856, his father was sent to the Federal Diet in Frankfurt to represent Holstein and Lauenburg, when Otto von Bismarck was also there to represent Prussia. He became a great friend of Bismarck's son Herbert when they played together. At 13, the family moved to Neustrelitz when his father became Chief Minister to the Grand Duke of Mecklenburg, where Bernhard attended the Frankfort gymnasium, before attending Lausanne, Leipzig, and Berlin Universities.

He volunteered for military service during the Franco-Prussian War and became a lance-corporal in the King's Hussar Regiment. In December 1870, the squadron was in action near Amiens, and he later described charging and killing French riflemen with his sabre. He was promoted to lieutenant and was invited to remain in the army after the war but declined. He completed his law degree at the University of Greifswald in 1872. Afterwards, he entered first the Prussian Civil Service and then the diplomatic service. His religion was Lutheran.

== Early career ==
In 1873 his father became State Secretary for Foreign Affairs in the German government, serving under Bismarck. Bülow entered the diplomatic corps. His first short assignments were to Rome, St. Petersburg, Vienna and then Athens. In 1876, he was appointed attaché to the German embassy in Paris, attended the Congress of Berlin as a secretary and became second secretary to the embassy in 1880.

In 1884, he had hoped to be posted to London but instead became first secretary at the embassy in St. Petersburg. On the way to his new assignment, he stayed for a couple of days at Varzin with the Bismarck family. Bismarck explained that he considered relations with Russia much more important than with Britain and so he had posted Bülow there. Bismarck reported himself as impressed by Bülow's calmness and demeanour during the interview. In Russia, he acted as chargé d'affaires in 1887 and advocated the ethnic cleansing of Poles from Polish territories of the German Empire in a future armed conflict. Bülow wrote regularly to the Foreign Office, complaining about his superior, Ambassador Schweinitz, who, however, was well-liked. Bülow earned for himself a reputation as only a schemer. In 1885, Friedrich von Holstein noted that Bülow was attempting to have Prince Chlodwig von Hohenlohe-Schillingsfürst removed as ambassador to France to get the post despite meanwhile exchanging friendly letters with him.

On 9 January 1886, still in St. Petersburg, he married Maria Anna Zoe Rosalia Beccadelli di Bologna, Principessa di Camporeale, Marchesa di Altavilla, whose first marriage with Count Karl von Dönhoff had been annulled by the Holy See in 1884. The princess, an accomplished pianist and pupil of Franz Liszt, was a stepdaughter of Marco Minghetti and the daughter of Donna Laura Minghetti (née Acton). She had been married for sixteen years and had three children. Bülow previously had numerous love affairs, but the marriage was intended to further his career. In 1888, he was offered the choice of appointments to Washington, DC, or Bucharest, and chose Bucharest, as Maria objected to the prospect of traveling to the United States and leaving her family behind. He spent the next five years scheming to be appointed to Rome, where his wife was well connected. King Umberto I of Italy was persuaded to write to Kaiser Wilhelm that he would be pleased if Bülow became ambassador there, which occurred in 1893.

== State Secretary for Foreign Affairs ==
On 21 June 1897 Bülow received a telegram instructing him to go to Kiel to speak to Wilhelm. On the way, he stopped at Frankfurt while changing trains and spoke to Philipp, Prince of Eulenburg. Eulenburg explained that Wilhelm wanted a new State Secretary for Foreign Affairs and urged Bülow to take the post, which his father had once held. Eulenburg also passed on advice about how best to manage Wilhelm, who lived on praise and could not stand to be contradicted. In Berlin, Bülow first spoke to Friedrich von Holstein, who was head of the political department of the German Foreign Office. Holstein advised him that although he would have preferred the present Secretary, Adolf Marschall von Bieberstein, to stay in his post, Wilhelm was determined to replace him and that he would prefer the successor to be Bülow. Perhaps Bülow might be able to find him an ambassador's post in due course. Chancellor Hohenlohe, desperate to retire because of old age, urged Bülow to take the position with an eye to succeeding him as chancellor. Bülow urged Hohenlohe to continue in office for as long as he could.

On 26 June, Bülow met with the Kaiser, who advised that it would be one of the new secretary's main tasks to set about building a world-class fleet capable of taking on the British without precipitating a war. Bülow asked for time to consider the offer, and on 3 August, he accepted. The two men formed a good working relationship. Rather than oppose Wilhelm, which some of his predecessors had done, Bülow agreed with him on all matters by sometimes privately relying on Wilhelm's bad memory and frequent changes of opinion to take the action that he thought best and ignore Wilhelm had instructed. The post of State Secretary was subordinate to that of the Chancellor and under Bismarck's chancellorship, it had been only a functionary. Under Bülow, that was largely reversed, Hohenlohe being content to let Bülow manage foreign affairs with his principal adviser, Holstein. Wilhelm would call on Bülow every morning to discuss state affairs but would rarely see the chancellor.

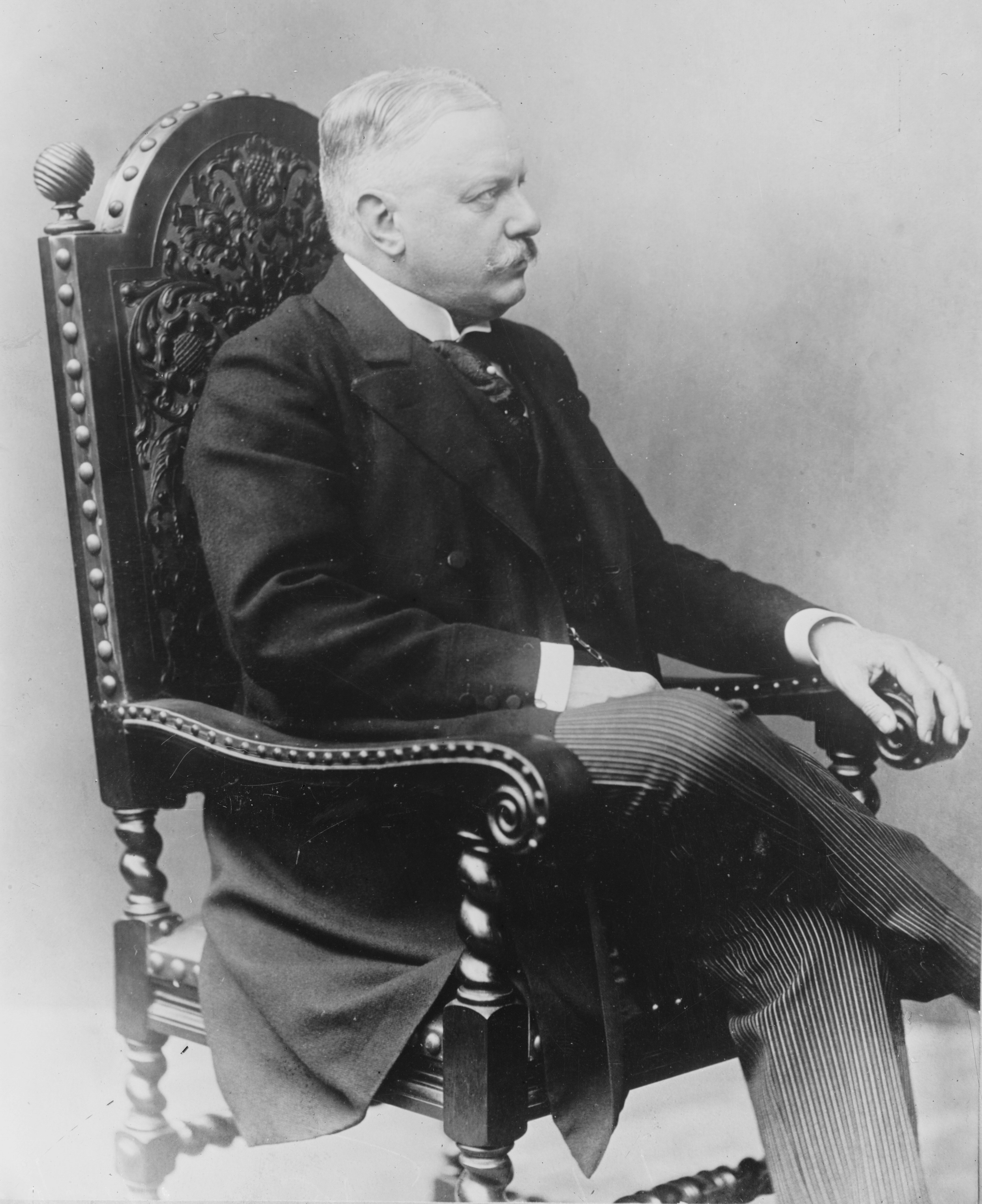
Bernhard von Bülow

== Imperial State Secretary ==
Bülow also held a seat in the Prussian government. Under the Imperial German Constitution, Wilhelm was both emperor of all Germany, and king of Prussia. As Foreign Secretary, Bülow was chiefly responsible for carrying out the policy of colonial expansion with which the emperor was identified. He was welcomed by the Foreign Office because he was the first professional diplomat to be placed in charge since Bismarck's resignation in 1890. Bülow had been wary of accepting the post if Holstein remained as Imperial First Councillor, as Holstein had in practice held great authority in recent years. Holstein was regarded as indispensable because of his long experience in office, rank, cunning and phenomenal memory. Eulenburg advised Bülow to stake out a firm but working relationship immediately on his arrival, and both succeeded in working together. In 1899, on bringing to a successful conclusion the negotiations by which Germany acquired the Caroline Islands, he was raised to the rank of Count.

In October 1900, Bülow was summoned to Wilhelm's hunting retreat at Hubertsstock, where Wilhelm asked Bülow to become Chancellor of the German Empire and Prime Minister of Prussia. Bülow queried whether he was the best man for the job. Wilhelm admitted he would have preferred Eulenburg on a personal level but was not sure he was sufficiently able. On 16 October, Bülow was summoned again to Homburg, where the Kaiser met his train in person. Wilhelm explained that Hohenlohe had announced he could no longer be and so Bülow accepted the job. A replacement State Secretary was necessary, which was first offered to Holstein, who turned it down since he preferred not to take a position that required appearing before the Reichstag. The post was given to Baron Oswald von Richthofen, who had already been serving as undersecretary to Bülow. It was made clear that the State Secretary's post would now revert to the subordinate role it had played in Bismarck's time, with Holstein remaining the more important adviser on foreign affairs.

== Chancellor ==
Cabinet (1900–1909)
Office	Incumbent	In office	Party
Imperial Chancellor	Bernhard von Bülow	17 October 1900 – 14 July 1909	None
Vice-Chancellor of Germany; Secretary for the Interior	Arthur von Posadowsky-Wehner	1 July 1897 – 24 June 1907	None
Vice-Chancellor of Germany; Secretary for the Interior	Theobald von Bethmann Hollweg	24 June 1907 – 7 July 1909	None
Secretary for the Foreign Affairs	Oswald von Richthofen	17 October 1900 – 17 January 1906	None
Secretary for the Foreign Affairs	Heinrich von Tschirschky	17 January 1906 – 7 October 1907	None
Secretary for the Foreign Affairs	Wilhelm von Schoen	7 October 1907 – 28 June 1910	None
Secretary for the Justice	Rudolf Arnold Nieberding	10 July 1893 – 25 October 1909	None
Secretary for the Navy	Alfred von Tirpitz	18 June 1897 – 15 March 1916	None
Secretary for the Post	Victor von Podbielski	1 July 1897 – 6 May 1901	None
Secretary for the Post	Reinhold Kraetke	6 May 1901 – 5 August 1917	None
Secretary for the Treasury	Max von Thielmann	1 July 1897 – 23 August 1903	None
Secretary for the Treasury	Hermann von Stengel	23 August 1903 – 20 February 1908	None
Secretary for the Treasury	Reinhold von Sydow	20 February 1908 – 14 July 1909	None

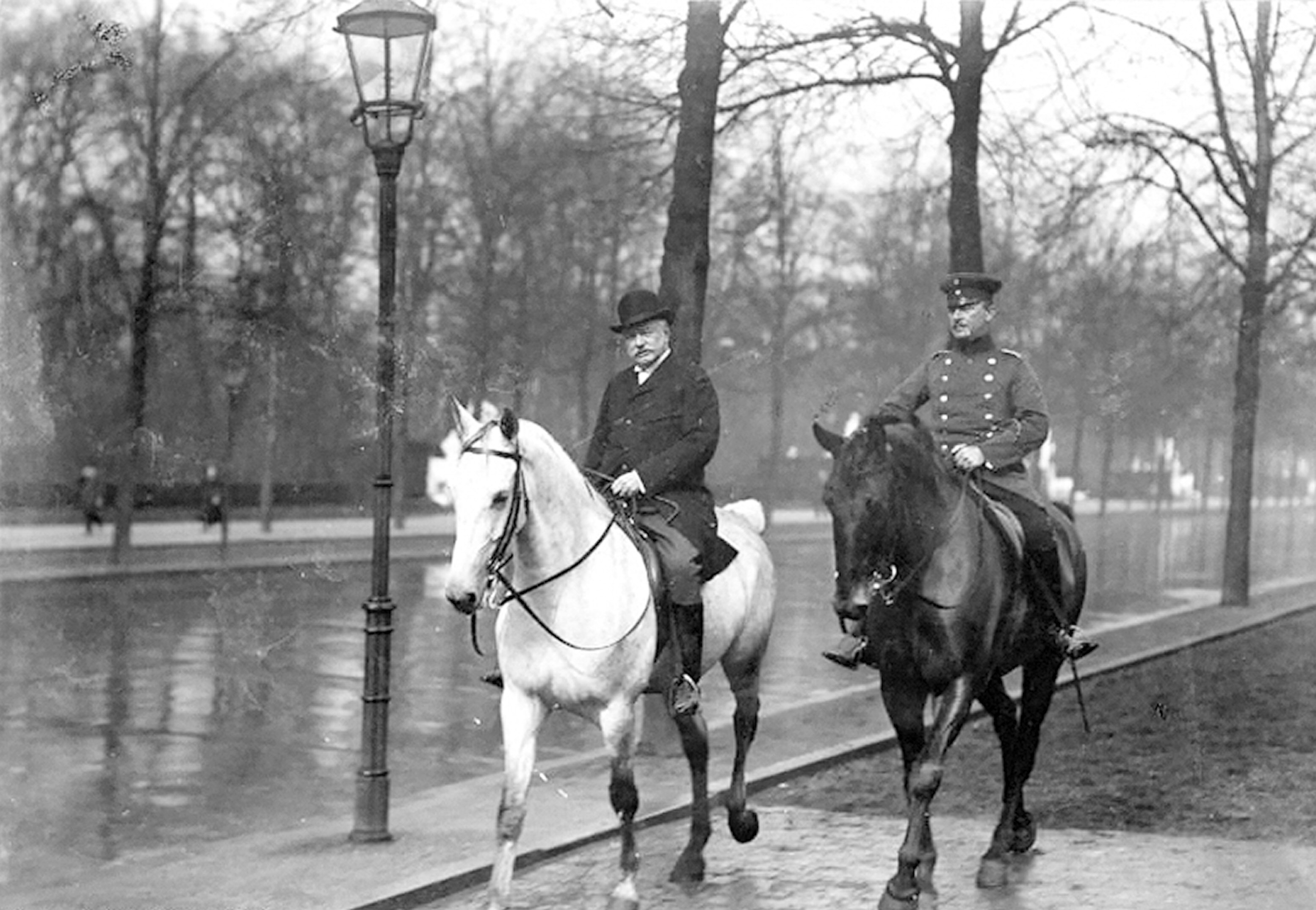
Bernhard Fürst von Bülow (left) at Berlin's Tiergarten

Bülow's mornings were reserved for Wilhelm, who would visit the chancellery every morning when in Berlin. His determination to remain on Wilhelm's good side was remarkable, even for those accustomed to his irascible manner. Wilhelm's household controller noted, "Whenever, by oversight, he expresses an opinion in disagreement with the emperor, he remains silent for a few moments and then says the exact contrary, with the preface, 'as Your Majesty so wisely remarked'". He gave up tobacco, beer, coffee and liqueurs and took 35 minutes of exercise every morning and would ride in good weather through the Tiergarten. He would, on Sundays, take long walks in the woods. In 1905, at 56, he led his old Hussars regiment at the gallop in an imperial parade and was rewarded by an appointment to the rank of major general. Wilhelm remarked to Eulenburg in 1901, "Since I have Bülow I can sleep peacefully". His first conspicuous act as chancellor was a masterly defence in the Reichstag of German imperialism in China. Bülow often spent his time defending German foreign policy there, to say nothing of covering for the Kaiser's many undiplomatic gaffes. In a speech in November 1906, Bülow introduced the concept of "encirclement" to the Reichstag that triggered the Teutonic press to blame Der Krieg in der Gegenwart. To Germany, the Triple Entente was a disaster, but he put a brave face on it.

=== Domestic policy and politics ===
Various reforms were also introduced during his tenure, including an extension of the period in which workers could claim accident insurance (1900), the making of industrial arbitration courts compulsory for towns with a population of more than 20,000 (1901) and an extension of health insurance and further controls on child labour (1903). A polling booth law was introduced that improved the secret ballot in 1904. Two years later, payment for Reichstag deputies was introduced.

In preparation for the 1907 election, Bülow created the "Bülow Bloc" of parties that were fervently antisocialist and anticlerical, devoutly patriotic, enthusiastically imperialist, and loyal to the Kaiser and the Fatherland. What Bebel labeled the "Hottentot election" was a disaster for the Social Democrats, who lost almost half their seats. However, Bülow was unable to turn the election coalition into a stable bloc in parliament

Bülow also produced proposals for the expropriation of lands from Prussian Poland for purposes of German settlement. In 1908, after the passing of an expropriation bill in the Diet, Bülow quelled concerns from Cardinal Kopp that the bill was too extreme. Other protesters of Bülow's expropriation bills included Polish author Henryk Sienkiewicz, who pleaded publicly to the global intellectual community for support.

=== Economic policy ===
Under pressure from the Junker-dominated Agrarian League, Bülow passed a tariff in 1902 that increased the duties on agriculture. As a result, the German grain production became one of the most protected in the world. Bülow's government also negotiated a series of commercial treaties with other European countries that came into force in March 1906.

=== Foreign policy ===
Bülow served as foreign minister, 1897–1909. To gain a stronger voice in world affairs he encouraged Admiral Tirpitz's naval expansion policy. Expecting Britain to be defeated by Russia he planned to pick up some colonies of the British Empire. He miscalculated, and alienated Britain even more, as it moved closer to an alliance with France and Russia. Bülow was motivated by domestic political concerns in his support of Tirpitz naval policy. In 1898 he said that such a policy would "mobilize the best patriotic forces" and "appeal to the highest national emotions" which would in turn "keep the non-Socialist workers away from Social Democracy" and pull the worker away from "the ensnarements of the socialists and accustom him to the monarchical order".

Britain still held the balance of power in Europe. France and Britain had been colonial rivals and had a long mutual opposition, but King Edward VII was determined to boost British popularity in France by a personal tour. Serious negotiations for the Entente Cordiale began between the French ambassador to London, Paul Cambon, and the British Foreign Secretary, Henry Petty-Fitzmaurice, 5th Marquess of Lansdowne. As part of settling differences, France agreed not to dispute British control of Egypt if Britain agreed to France's claims to Morocco.

On 24 March 1904, France formally informed the German ambassador of the new Anglo-French Convention. Prince Hugo von Radolin, the ambassador, responded that he felt the agreement natural and justified. The German press noted that the deal in Morocco did not harm national interests and that the French intervention to restore order in the country might help German trade. Still, Bülow was cynical and took the Social Darwinist's view that expansion was a fact of life. His policy was unclear, even to the generals.

Although not swayed by bellicose generals, he followed a central planning agenda. If Prussia was euphoric, Bülow remained ambitious for imperial grandiosity and world power. Commercial growth in iron, steel, mining, railways and ironclads, and a new navy was driven by huge outputs and highly-competitive contractors. His chauvinism was extensive, a defensive embrasure against British alliance-building on which Germany would reject negotiations. He had promised to reply directly to British Colonial Secretary Joseph Chamberlain but thought better of it: "it is the English who must make advances to us". That unintentionally entrenched the Entente.

Bülow assured the British ambassador that he was pleased to see Britain and France settling their differences. He informed the Reichstag that Germany had no objections to the deal and no concerns about German interests in Morocco. Holstein had a different view: intervention in Moroccan affairs was governed by the Treaty of Madrid. Holstein argued that Germany had been sidelined by not being included in the negotiations and that Morocco was a country that showed promise for German influence and trade, which must eventually suffer if it came under French control. Previously he had dismissed any possibility of agreement between France and Britain. France now offered military assistance to Morocco to improve order in the country. Bülow responded by supporting the position of an independent Morocco, encouraging the United States to become involved and threatened war if France intervened. He was now convinced that the new friendliness between France and Britain was a threat to Germany, particularly if the accord deepened, but France was ill-prepared for war. Despite the possible risks of assassination, Bülow persuaded Wilhelm to make a visit to Tangier in 1905, where he made a speech supporting Morocco's independence, but his presence there simultaneously demonstrated Germany's determination to maintain its own influence.

=== Algeciras Conference ===
A friendly German naval presence in Morocco and a military base nearby could threaten the British or the important trade routes through the Mediterranean. The British continued to support beleaguered French Foreign Minister Theophile Delcassé. Lansdowne had been surprised by the German reaction, but Britain might take on the fledgling German fleet before it grew too large. On 3 June 1905, Abdelaziz of Morocco, prompted by Germany, rejected the French offer of assistance and called for an international conference. On 6 June, after Delcassé had resigned, news spread to Berlin. The following morning, Bülow was elevated to the rank of prince (Fürst). The occasion coincided with the marriage of the crown prince and echoed the elevation of Bismarck to prince in the Hall of Mirrors at the Palace of Versailles. Germany continued to press for further French concessions. Bülow carefully instructed Radolin and also spoke to the French ambassador in Berlin. However, the effect was somewhat the reverse of what he intended by hardening the resolve of French Premier Maurice Rouvier to resist further demands for rapprochement. The Algeciras Conference commenced on 16 January 1906 at Algeciras Town Hall. During the conference, a British fleet of 20 battleships, with accompanying cruisers and destroyers, visited the port town, and all of the delegates were invited on board.

The conference went badly for Germany, with a vote against German proposals that was 10–3. Holstein wished to threaten war against France, but Bülow ordered Holstein to take no further part in the conference. No satisfactory outcome for Germany was in sight by April, which left the only course of action to wind it down as best he could. The result was received badly in Germany, with objections raised in the press. On 5 April 1906, Bülow was obliged to appear before the Reichstag to defend the outcome, and during a heated exchange, he collapsed and was carried from the hall. At first, it was thought he had suffered a fatal stroke. Lord Fitzmaurice, in the British House of Lords, compared the incident with that of the death of William Pitt, 1st Earl of Chatham, a compliment that was much appreciated in Germany. Bülow's collapse was ascribed to overwork and influenza but, after a month's rest, he was able to resume his duties.

=== Scandal ===
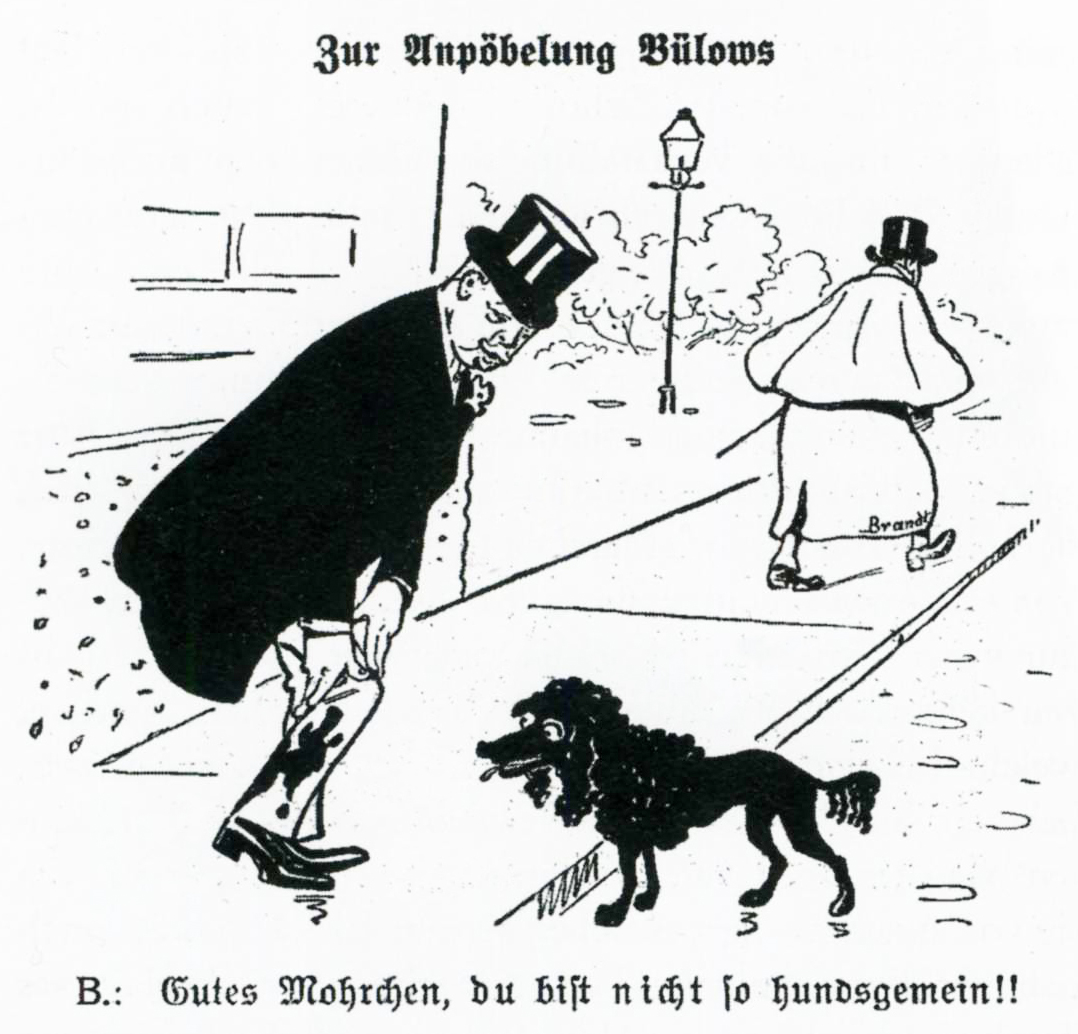
Cartoon satirising Bülow on 27 October 1907 in Kladderadatsch, "On the maligning of Bülow", "Good Mohrchen, you would never be such a bad dog!"

In 1907, during the Harden–Eulenburg Affair, Adolf Brand, the founding editor of the homosexual periodical Der Eigene, printed a pamphlet alleging that Bülow had been blackmailed for engaging in homosexual practices and was morally obligated to oppose Paragraph 175 of the German penal code, which outlawed homosexuality. Sued for slander and brought to trial on 7 November 1907, Brand asserted that Bülow had embraced and kissed his private secretary, Privy Councilor Max Scheefer, at all-male gatherings hosted by Eulenburg. Testifying in his own defense, Bülow denied the accusation but remarked he had heard unsavoury rumours about Eulenburg. Taking the stand, Eulenburg defended himself against Brand's charge by denying that he had ever held such events and claimed that he had never engaged in same-sex acts, which subsequently led to a perjury trial. Despite concluding testimony by the chief of the Berlin police that Bülow may have been the victim of a homosexual blackmailer, he easily prevailed in court, and Brand was sent to prison.

=== Daily Telegraph Affair ===
In November 1907, Wilhelm made a long-planned state visit to Britain. He had attempted to cancel the visit because of the recent scandals, but it went ahead and was so successful that he decided to remain in Britain for a holiday. He rented a house for the purpose from Colonel Edward Montague Stuart-Wortley and spoke freely to its owner while he was there. In September 1908, they discussed Wortley's idea to have London's Daily Telegraph publish the contents of their conversations using the notes Stuart-Wortley had taken. He believed that doing so would help improve relations between their two countries. Wilhelm agreed, and the journalist Harold Spender wrote an article in the form of an interview. The Daily Telegraph then sent the draft to Wilhelm in Berlin and asked for approval to publish it.

What happened with the manuscript next, and especially Bülow's role in the matter, has been a subject of historical controversy for decades. Recent scholarship has largely disproved Bülow's claim that he never read the draft and had relied on the Foreign Office to make any necessary changes and approve it. Historian John C. G. Röhl calls Bülow's version a "cynical cover-up" to deflect from himself the blame for the publishing of the damaging article. It is all but certain that Bülow did read the draft that Wilhelm forwarded to him and then sent it to the Foreign Office for review. The officials there made a few minor factual corrections and sent it back to Bülow on the assumption that he would make the final decision on publication since the matter was so highly political. Bülow personally discussed the article with Wilhelm on 12 October. After talking the next day with Foreign Affairs Secretary Wilhelm von Schoen about various suggested changes, Bülow sent the manuscript to Martin Freiherr von Rücker-Jenisch, a cousin of his who was liaison with the Foreign Office in the Kaiser's suite. Jenisch sent the draft back to Wilhelm with a letter outlining three places where "exception can be taken to the wording" and noting changes in the margins based on the comments Bülow had made. Wilhelm signed the cover letter and sent the annotated draft to Stuart-Wortley on 16 October. (The source does not say whether either Stuart-Wortley or The Daily Telegraph made any of the suggested changes to the original draft.)

The article appeared in print on 28 October and caused a storm in both Britain and Germany. Wilhelm expressed many controversial and offensive opinions in it:

- The English were mad as March hares because they repeatedly rejected his offers of friendship.
- Most Germans disliked the English, and his own friendly attitude put him in a "distinct minority".
- He had intervened against France and Russia on Britain's behalf during the Second Boer War.
- He had provided a campaign plan that was used by the British during the war.
- Germany's fleet buildup was directed not against Britain but Japan.

Wilhelm thus managed to offend Japanese, French, Russian and especially British sensibilities. Even Germans were outraged, as he claimed to have helped the British in their war against the Boers, whom most Germans had favoured.

Bülow accused the Foreign Office of failing to comment properly on the article. The office responded that it was his role to decide on publication in such a situation. Questions arose as to Wilhelm's competence to rule and the role he should be permitted under the constitution. The matter was debated in the Reichstag, where Bülow had to defend his own position and that of Wilhelm. Bülow wrote to Wilhelm and offered to resign unless Wilhelm could give him full support in the matter. Bülow arranged the publication of a defence of the events in the Norddeutsche Allgemeine Zeitung, which glossed over Wilhelm's remarks and concentrated on the failings of the Foreign Office in not examining the article properly. It explained that Bülow had offered to take full responsibility for the office's failings, but Wilhelm had refused to accept his resignation.

Bülow succeeded in turning away criticism from himself in the Reichstag and finished his speech to cheering from the assembly. Holstein observed that the nature of the comments meant that he could almost certainly not have defended Wilhelm for making them and that Bülow could not have done otherwise: disputing the factual accuracy of much of what Wilhelm had said and leaving blame for events squarely with him. His explanation was that the comments had been made with the best of intentions and would certainly not be repeated. He declared his conviction that the disastrous effects of the interview would induce Wilhelm to observe strict reserve, even in private conversations, or neither he nor any successor could assume responsibility.

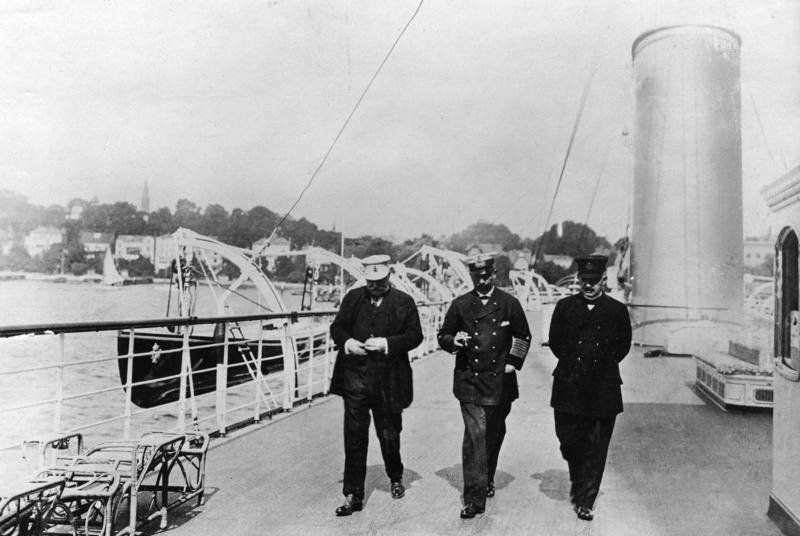
Von Bülow, Emperor Wilhelm II, Rudolf von Valentini (left to right) in 1908

Wilhelm was due to be away from Germany during the Reichstag debate on a trip to Austria and received much criticism for not staying at home. Wilhelm queried whether he ought to cancel the trip, but Bülow advised him to continue with it. Holstein asked Bülow about Wilhelm's absence; Bülow denied advising Wilhelm to go. Matters were not improved when during the visit, Count Dietrich von Hülsen-Haeseler, the chief of the German Imperial Military Cabinet, died from a heart attack at Donaueschingen, the estate of Prince Max von Fürstenberg. On Wilhelm's return, Bülow persuaded him to endorse a statement that he concurred with Bülow's statements to the Reichstag. Wilhelm was at that point close to breakdown and considering abdication.

Wilhelm withdrew from public appearances for six weeks, which was generally seen as an act of penitence rather than the consequence of his depression. Public opinion began to reflect on whether the Chancellor had failed to advise him properly and then failed to defend Wilhelm's actions in the Reichstag. Wilhelm's own view of the affair began to change to blaming Bülow for failing to warn him of the difficulties that the article would cause. He determined that Bülow would have to be replaced. In June 1909, difficulties arose in obtaining additional financing for ongoing ship construction. Wilhelm warned Bülow that if he failed to carry a majority for imposing inheritance taxes, Bülow would have to resign. He was defeated by eight votes. On board the royal yacht, Hohenzollern, on 26 June, Bülow offered his resignation, exactly twelve years after accepting the office.

On 14 July, the resignation was announced, and Theobald von Bethmann Hollweg became the new Chancellor. Wilhelm dined with the Bülows and expressed his regret that the prince was determined to resign. He observed that he had been informed that some of those who voted against the inheritance tax had done so out of animosity against Bülow and his handling of the Telegraph affair, rather out of opposition to the tax. For his services to the state, Bülow was awarded the Order of the Black Eagle set in diamonds.

== Later life ==
After his resignation in 1909, Bülow lived principally at the villa in Rome that he had purchased for his retirement. Part of the summer was usually spent by him at Klein Flottbek, near Hamburg, or on the island of Norderney. A large fortune left him by a cousin, a Hamburg merchant, enabled him to live in elegant leisure and to make his house in Rome a centre of literary and political society.

He employed his leisure in writing for the centenary celebrations of the Wars of Liberation, a remarkable book on Imperial Germany, extolling its achievements and defending the main lines of his own foreign policy. (Note: Engl. translation, M. Lavenz, 1914; English translation 1916)) In a revised edition of his book on Imperial Germany, published after the start of the First World War, he omitted or altered many passages that seemed compromising in light of the war like his policy of lulling Britain into a false sense of security while the German Navy was being constructed. He was understood to be in deeply malodorous company with Wilhelm, who never forgave him his attitude and action with regard to a 1908 interview in The Daily Telegraph.

=== Wartime diplomat ===
In 1914–1915, Bülow was the ambassador to Italy but failed to bring King Victor Emmanuel III to join the Central Powers. Italy had declared its neutrality at the outbreak of the war but intimated on 5 July 1914 through diplomatic channels that Austria-Hungary's ultimatum to Serbia was aggressive and provocative. On 9 December 1914, Sidney Sonnino addressed the Austrian Note to the Austro-Hungarian Foreign Minister, Count Berchtold, to call attention to Article VII of the treaty by which Italy participated in the Triple Alliance, with particular reference to the clause that bound Austria-Hungary, if it disturbed the status quo in the Balkans even by a temporary occupation of Serbian territory, to come to an agreement with Italy and to arrange for compensations. The questions of the Trentino Agreement and Trieste were thus formally opened.

Austria-Hungary manifested great reluctance to enter upon the question of compensations, but Germany was more alert to its own concerns. Bülow was, therefore, entrusted with the temporary charge of the German embassy in Rome since the actual ambassador, Flotow, went on sick leave (19 December 1914). Bülow at once plunged into active negotiations and was sympathetic with Italian demands for compensation. He had, however, to fight the intransigence of Hungarian Prime Minister István Tisza, and Tisza's nominee, who was Berchtold's successor, Baron von Burian. Bülow was from the first for the complete cession of the Trentino region to Italy, but Austria-Hungary was willing to cede only part of it. Sonnino pointed out that Italian feeling would not be satisfied even with the whole of the Trentino but would also, in accordance with its irredentism, demand Trieste. Bülow continued to urge that all he could mediate for was the Trentino but that Austria would fight to keep Trieste.

In early April 1915, Italy's secret negotiations demanded the Trentino, Trieste and the Curzolane Islands, off the coast of Dalmatia. Austria-Hungary recognised Italian sovereignty over Valona. However, negotiations dragged on until the middle of May, when Bülow made a grave but characteristic tactical mistake. He induced the former Italian Prime Minister Giovanni Giolitti to come to Rome from Turin in the hope of preventing a rupture and bringing about the acceptance of the Austro-Hungarian terms.

Prime Minister Antonio Salandra suddenly resigned. There was a great outburst of popular indignation, fanned by the impassioned eloquence of d'Annunzio and expressed in demonstrations in front of the Quirinal, the royal palace, and on the Capitoline Hill, the centre of Rome. After a great majority in the Italian Parliament had on 20 May supported Salandra, a general mobilisation was ordered on 22 May, and the formal declaration of war against Austria-Hungary followed on 23 May 1915. The next day, Bülow left Rome. He regarded his task as impossible in any case, and on returning, he remarked: "Morale and attitude of the German people: A-1. Political leadership: Z-Minus".

=== Considered for chancellorship ===
He lived in Berlin, but after the peace he again resided in Rome for part of every year and spent the rest of the year in Germany. His name was mentioned in a ministerial crisis of 1921, as a possible chancellor. Although many of the leading figures in the Reichstag, including Matthias Erzberger, hoped that Bülow would succeed Bethmann Hollweg, who resigned in 1917, he was entirely unacceptable to the vast majority of both the German people and the Reichstag.

He died on 28 October 1929 in Rome.

== Personality ==
Bülow spoke several languages and was a charming conversationalist. He was comfortably at home in high society and could entertain and impress even his opponents. He was thought by some colleagues to be untrustworthy: Alfred von Kiderlen-Waechter referred to him as "the Eel". Once he had obtained power and position in the German government, he had no overarching ideas of what to do with them, allowing others to guide policy. His character made him a good choice to work with Kaiser Wilhelm II, who required agreement and flattery from his senior ministers, even if they sometimes then ignored his instructions. He wrote four volumes of autobiography, to be published after his death, which markedly altered public perception of his character, as they included his candid and malicious descriptions of others. He was a fine debater in the Reichstag but was generally lazy in carrying out his duties. He was described by Friedrich von Holstein, who was for 30 years the first councillor in the foreign department and a major influence on policy throughout that time, as having "read more Machiavelli than he could digest". His mother-in-law claimed, "Bernhard makes a secret out of everything".

== Honours ==
- Granted the noble title of Prince (Fürst) in 1905.
- Honorary member of the Prussian Academy of Sciences
- Honorary doctorates from the Universities of Königsberg and Münster
- Canon of the Brandenburg Cathedral chapter
- Bülowplatz in Berlin-Mitte named in his honour between 1910 and 1933 (now Rosa-Luxemburg-Platz)

German orders and decorations

- Prussia:
  - Knight of Honour of the Johanniter Order, 23 August 1880; Knight of Justice, 1898
  - Knight of the Red Eagle, 3rd Class with Bow, 18 January 1886; 1st Class with Oak Leaves, 6 February 1898
  - Knight of the Royal Crown Order, 1st Class
  - Grand Commander's Cross of the Royal House Order of Hohenzollern, December 1902
  - Landwehr Service Medal, 1st Class
  - Knight of the Black Eagle, with Collar and in Brilliants, July 1909
- (Duchy of Anhalt) Anhalt: Grand Cross of the Order of Albert the Bear
- Bavaria:
  - Grand Cross of Merit of the Bavarian Crown, 1897
  - Knight of St. Hubert, 1900
- Baden:
  - Grand Cross of the Zähringer Lion, with Oak Leaves, 1898
  - Knight of the House Order of Fidelity, 1900
- Brunswick: Grand Cross of the Order of Henry the Lion, 1902
- (Saxe-Coburg and Gotha) (Duchy of Saxe-Altenburg) (Saxe-Meiningen) Ernestine duchies: Grand Cross of the Saxe-Ernestine House Order
- (Grand Duchy of Hesse) Hesse and by Rhine:
  - Grand Cross of the Merit Order of Philip the Magnanimous, 23 March 1900
  - Grand Cross of the Ludwig Order, 21 December 1900
- Lippe: Cross of Honour of the House Order of Lippe, 1st Class
- Oldenburg: Grand Cross of the Order of Duke Peter Friedrich Ludwig, 18 February 1878; with Golden Crown and Collar
- Mecklenburg:
  - Grand Cross of the Wendish Crown, with Golden Crown, 17 October 1864
  - Grand Cross of the Griffon, with Swords (Schwerin)
  - Cross for Distinction in War (Strelitz)
- Saxe-Weimar-Eisenach: Grand Cross of the White Falcon, 1895
- Saxony:
  - Grand Cross of the Albert Order, with Golden Star, 1890; with Silver Crown
  - Knight of the Rue Crown, 1900
- Schaumburg-Lippe: Cross of Honour of the House Order of Schaumburg-Lippe, 1st Class
- Württemberg:
  - Grand Cross of the Friedrich Order, with Crown, 1899
  - Grand Cross of the Württemberg Crown, 1900

Foreign orders and decorations

- (Austrian Empire) (Kingdom of Hungary) Austria-Hungary:
  - Knight of the Iron Crown, 3rd Class, 1878
  - Grand Cross of the Imperial Order of Leopold, 1897
  - Grand Cross of the Royal Hungarian Order of St. Stephen, 1900; in Brilliants, 1908
- Belgium: Grand Cordon of the Order of Leopold
- Bulgaria: Grand Cross of St. Alexander, in Brilliants
- Denmark: Knight of the Elephant, 19 November 1906
- Ethiopia: Grand Cross of the Star of Ethiopia
- France:
  - Grand Officer of the Legion of Honour, with Star
  - (Tunisia): Grand Officer of the Order of Glory
- Greece: Grand Cross of the Redeemer
- Italy:
  - Knight of the Annunziata, 28 August 1902
  - Grand Cross of Saints Maurice and Lazarus
  - Knight of the Crown of Italy
- Japan: Grand Cordon of the Rising Sun, with Paulownia Flowers
- Monaco: Grand Cross of St. Charles
- Montenegro: Grand Cross of the Order of Prince Danilo I
- Netherlands: Grand Cross of the Netherlands Lion
- Norway: Grand Cross of St. Olav, 15 December 1906
- Ottoman Empire:
  - Order of Distinction
  - Gold and Silver Imtiyaz Medals
  - Order of Glory
  - Order of Osmanieh, 1st Class in Brilliants
  - Order of the Medjidie, 1st Class in Brilliants
- Persia:
  - Order of the Aqdas, 2nd Class
  - Order of the Lion and the Sun, 2nd Class
- Portugal: Grand Cross of the Tower and Sword, with Collar
- Qing dynasty: Order of the Double Dragon, Class I Grade III
- Romania:
  - Grand Cross of the Star of Romania
  - Grand Cross of the Crown of Romania
  - Collar of the Order of Carol I
- Russia: Knight of St. Andrew, in Brilliants, September 1901
- Serbia: Grand Cross of the White Eagle
- (Thailand) Siam: Grand Cross of the White Elephant
- Spain:
  - Grand Cross of the Order of Isabella the Catholic, 1883
  - Grand Cross of the Order of Charles III, with Collar, 3 July 1899
  - Knight of the Golden Fleece, 23 November 1905
- Sweden: Knight of the Seraphim, 6 June 1908
- United Kingdom: Honorary Grand Cross of the Royal Victorian Order, 23 November 1899

Military appointments

- À la suite of the Prussian Army

== Sources ==
- Clark, Christopher. The Sleepwalkers: How Europe Went to War in 1914 (2012)
- Gooch, G.P. Before the war: studies in diplomacy (vol 1 1936) online see chapter on von Bulow pp 187–204.
- Hale, Oron James. "Prince Von Bulow: His Memoirs and His German Critics" Journal of Modern History (1932), 4#2 pp 261–277. online
- Lerman, Katherine Anne. Chancellor as Courtier. Bernhard von Bulow & the Governance of Germany, 1900–1909 (1990) 350pp.
- Massie, Robert K. (1991). Dreadnought: Britain, Germany, and the Coming of the Great War (1st ed.). New York: Random House. ISBN 0-345-37556-4.
- Morrow, Ian F. D. "The Foreign Policy of Prince Von Bulow, 1898–1909." Cambridge Historical Journal 4#1 (1932): 63–93. online.
- Tracy, Michael (1989). Government and Agriculture in Western Europe, 1880–1988. London: Harvester Wheatsheaf.
- van Waarden, Betto. "Demands of a transnational public sphere: the diplomatic conflict between Joseph Chamberlain and Bernhard von Bülow and how the mass press shaped expectations for mediatized politics around the turn of the twentieth century." European Review of History: Revue européenne d'histoire 26.3 (2019): 476–504. online
- Winzen, Peter. "Prince Bülow's 'Weltmachtpolitik.'" Australian Journal of Politics & History (1976) 22#2 pp 227–242.

=== Primary sources ===
- Bülow, Bernhard von (1932). Memoirs of Prince von Bülow Vol IV, 1849–1897. translated from German by Geoffrey Dunlop and F. A. Voight. Boston: Little, Brown and Company.
- Bülow, Bernhard, Fürst von. Imperial Germany (1916) online
- Bülow, Bernhard, Fürst von. Letters; a selection from Prince von Bülow's official correspondence as Imperial Chancellor during the years 1903–1909 online

Preceded by Prince Hohenlohe-Schillingsfürst	Chancellor of Germany; Prime Minister of Prussia; 1900–1909	Succeeded by Theobald von Bethmann Hollweg
