= XGRS =

German radio station in Japanese-occupied Shanghai

Programming
- Format: variety

Technical information
- Power: long wave 500-1250 Watts, short wave up to 7500 Watts

XGRS was a Shanghai-based radio station broadcasting on both shortwave and long wave which was owned and operated by the German government in Japanese-occupied China during World War II. Originally established as a German-language station designed to provide news and information to German residents of China, in 1940 it began broadcasting a multilingual program schedule with alternating broadcasts in English, German, Chinese, Russian, Japanese, and Hindi. It operated from the Kaiser Wilhelm School.

Beginning in 1940 Erwin Wickert was the effective manager of the station, occupying the formal post of radio attaché at the German consulate in Shanghai. Peter Waldbauer, an English-speaking Austrian, hosted the program A Briton's Point of View, during which he feigned to be a Briton and would editorialize an anti-Allied perspective. Other on-air staff included Americans Robert Fockler and Herbert May, and Australian John Holland (the latter would, after the war, be sentenced to five years imprisonment as a result of his work for XGRS and, later, a Japanese broadcaster).

A typical prime-time, weekday lineup for XGRS included Commentary by David Lester at 6:15 p.m., Light Music at 6:25 p.m., Asia's Views on the News at 6:30 p.m., La demi-heure francaise at 6:45 p.m., Commentary in English at 7:15 p.m., Shanghai Walla-Walla at 7:30 p.m., News in English at 7:45 p.m., American Program at 8:00 p.m., Commentary by Herbert May at 8:30 p.m., News in Russian at 8:45 p.m., Ukrainian Program at 9:00 p.m., Classical Concert at 9:15 p.m., and News in English at 10:30 p.m. International news was provided by the Trans-Ocean News Service.

On 25 May 1945, following the German surrender, XGRS was seized by Japan who operated it using the call letters XGOO. Following the Japanese surrender it, in turn, passed to Chinese control and was operated as XORA.

American and British counterparts of XGRS were XMHA (″The Call of the Orient″, Carroll Alcott), XMHC and XCDN/XGDN (″The Voice of Democracy″). Other foreign stations in Shanghai included XIRS (Italian), FFZ (French), XRVN (Russian), XQHA and XOJB (Japanese). Altogether there were about 40 radio stations in Shanghai in 1941.

== See also ==
- Reich Ministry of Public Enlightenment and Propaganda
