= Ulrich Wickert =

German journalist and author

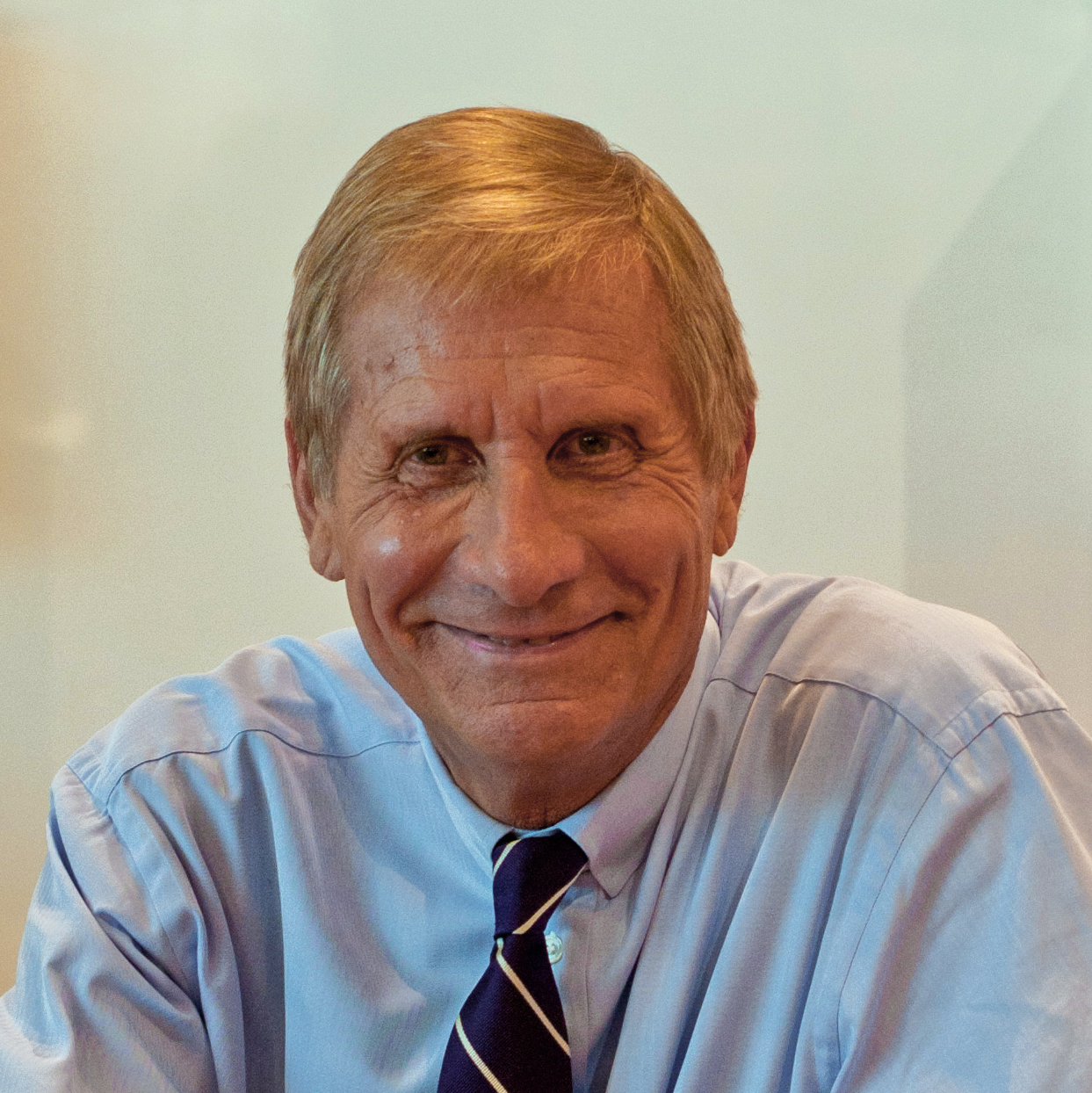
- Wickert in 2011
- Born: 2 December 1942 (age 83); Tokyo, Japan
- Occupations: Journalist, author

Ulrich Wickert (born 2 December 1942) is a Japanese-born German journalist and author. He is one of the best-known broadcasters in Germany.

== Early life ==
Born in Tokyo, Japan, Wickert grew up in Heidelberg and Paris as a result of his father Erwin Wickert being employed with NATO as a German diplomat. In the 1960s, he studied law and political sciences at the University of Bonn. In 1962, he spent a year at Wesleyan University on a Fulbright scholarship.

After passing the first level of German bar exams in 1968, he started working as freelance radio producer for ARD, becoming a full-time editor there a short time later.

== Career ==
Between 1969 and 1977, Wickert was an editor for Monitor, a political affairs program produced by the WDR network. He was deployed as a correspondent for every French presidential election between 1969 and 1978. In 1978 he was made French correspondent and transferred to the Paris bureau of the ARD.

In 1981, he founded the discussion group "Journalists for Public Broadcasting"; in that same year he became chief correspondent of the ARD bureau in New York. In 1984 he became chief correspondent of the Paris ARD bureau. At the Place de la Concorde he demonstrated how French pedestrians walk across several lanes of busy car traffic without the help of traffic lights.

From July 1991 to August 2006 he was chief anchor for Tagesthemen, in alternation with Sabine Christiansen (1991–1997), Gabi Bauer (1997–2001) and Anne Will (2001–2006). On 11 April 2004 he announced that he would not seek a renewal of his contract, which expired in 2006. On 1 September 2006 Wickert was succeeded by Washington D.C. bureau chief Tom Buhrow.

In addition to his journalistic work, Wickert has published a total of more than 35 non-fiction books and crime novels (as of 2025).

He was elevated to the French Légion d'honneur in 2005 for his service to French-German relations.

== Personal life ==
Wickert is in his third marriage, to Julia Jäkel, CEO of the publishing house Gruner + Jahr.

He is the uncle of actress Emily Wood.
