= August zu Eulenburg =

Prussian army general and royal official

Graf August zu Eulenburg
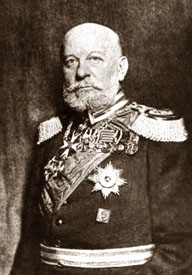
- Full name: August Ludwig Traugott Botho
- Born: 22 October 1838; Königsberg, Kingdom of Prussia
- Died: 16 June 1921 (aged 82); Berlin, Weimar Republic
- Spouse: Adelaide von Witzleben
- Father: Count Botho Heinrich zu Eulenburg
- Mother: Countess Therese von Dönhoff

August Ludwig Traugott Botho Graf zu Eulenburg (22 October 1838 – 16 June 1921) was an officer in the Prussian, and later German armies, and official in the Prussian royal court. He was the younger brother of Count Botho zu Eulenburg, who served as Minister-President of Prussia from 1892 to 1894, and a second cousin of Philipp, Prince of Eulenburg, the close friend of Kaiser Wilhelm II.

== Biography ==
Born into the Upper Saxon noble family of Eulenburg, August joined the army on 1 November 1856 as a grenadier in the 1st Foot Guard Regiment after his graduation from the Marienwerder Gymnasium. He was promoted to second lieutenant two years later on 13 April 1858, and between 1860 and 1862 he participated in the trade mission in East Asia as an attaché under his kinsman Friedrich Albrecht zu Eulenburg.

Upon his return to Prussia in 1865, Eulenburg pursued a career in the royal court; he was made a personal adjutant to the crown prince (the future Emperor Frederick III), before being appointed Marshal of the Royal Court in 1868, thus placing him in charge of the court's administrative affairs. He then served as a member of the General-Ordenskommission from 1879 to 1890, and served as Chief Master of Ceremonies between 1883 and 1914 and Grand Marshal of the Court and House (Oberhof- und Hausmarschall) to Kaiser Wilhelm II from 1890 to 1914. He was also a member of the Herrenhaus and Minister of the Royal House from 1907 to the end of Wilhelm II's reign in 1918.

Following Otto von Bismarck's dismissal in 1890, Eulenburg mediated the reconciliation between the emperor and former chancellor. Conversely, he encouraged the rift between his brother Botho and Caprivi, in the hopes that the former would replace the latter as chancellor, as Botho was seen in conservative circles as a bulwark against the rising threat of social democracy; Wilhelm II would ultimately appoint Prince Hohenlohe.

Eulenburg retired from active military service as a colonel in 1889, but was promoted to major-general in 1891 and lieutenant-general in 1895, before being made à la suite General of the Infantry on 18 October 1904. He continued to serve as Chief Representative (General-Bevollmächtigter) of the House of Hohenzollern after the November Revolution for the remainder of his life.

He died in 1921 in Berlin, and was buried in the Holy Trinity Cemetery in the Kreuzberg district alongside his family.

== Honours ==
German orders and decorations

- Prussia:
  - Knight of the Red Eagle, 4th Class, 1866; 2nd Class with Oak Leaves and Swords on Ring, 1876; with Star, 6 June 1879; Grand Cross with Crown
  - Iron Cross (1870), 2nd Class
  - Knight's Cross of the Royal House Order of Hohenzollern, 6 January 1875; Commander's Cross with Star, 27 January 1893; Grand Commander's Cross
  - Knight of the Royal Crown Order, 1st Class, 22 March 1886
  - Landwehr Service Medal, 2nd Class
  - Knight of the Black Eagle, with Collar and in Brilliants 22.03.1897
  - Knight of Merit of the Prussian Crown, 2 July 1905
- Hohenzollern: Cross of Honour of the Princely House Order of Hohenzollern, 1st Class
- Anhalt: Grand Cross of the Order of Albert the Bear, 1890; with Crown
- Brunswick: Grand Cross of the Order of Henry the Lion
- Baden:
  - Commander of the Zähringer Lion, 1st Class with Swords, 1870; Grand Cross, 1893
  - Knight of the House Order of Fidelity, 1904
- Bavaria:
  - Grand Cross of the Merit Order of St. Michael, 1886
  - Grand Cross of Merit of the Bavarian Crown, 1897
  - Knight of St. Hubert, 1902
  - Knight of the Military Merit Order, 1st Class
- (Saxe-Coburg and Gotha) (Duchy of Saxe-Altenburg) (Saxe-Meiningen) Ernestine duchies: Grand Cross of the Saxe-Ernestine House Order, 1874
- Hesse and by Rhine:
  - Grand Cross of the Merit Order of Philip the Magnanimous, 18 February 1878; with Crown, 24 May 1888
  - Grand Cross of the Ludwig Order, 6 May 1892
- Lippe-Detmold: Cross of Honour of the House Order of Lippe, 1st Class
- Mecklenburg: Grand Cross of the Wendish Crown, with Golden Crown, 22 March 1884
- Oldenburg: Grand Cross of the Order of Duke Peter Friedrich Ludwig, 18 February 1878; with Collar
- Saxe-Weimar-Eisenach: Grand Cross of the White Falcon, 1876
- Saxony:
  - Grand Cross of the Albert Order, with Golden Star, 1891
  - Knight of the Rue Crown, 1897
- Schaumburg-Lippe:
  - Cross of Honour of the House Order of Schaumburg-Lippe, 1st Class
  - Military Merit Medal
- Waldeck and Pyrmont: Military Merit Cross (for Officers), 1st Class
- Württemberg:
  - Knight of Honour of the Württemberg Crown, with Swords, 1870; Grand Cross, 1892
  - Grand Cross of the Friedrich Order, 1872

Foreign orders and decorations

- (Austrian Empire) (Kingdom of Hungary) Austria-Hungary:
  - Knight of the Iron Crown, 1st Class, 1872
  - Grand Cross of the Imperial Order of Leopold, 1889
  - Grand Cross of the Royal Hungarian Order of St. Stephen, 1897; in Brilliants, 1908
- Belgium:
  - Grand Cordon of the Order of Leopold
  - Grand Cross of the African Star
- Principality of Bulgaria:
  - Grand Cross of St. Alexander
  - Grand Cross of Civil Merit, in Brilliants
- Denmark:
  - Grand Cross of the Dannebrog, 19 August 1873; in Brilliants, 29 June 1890
  - Knight of the Elephant, 3 April 1903
- Kingdom of Greece: Grand Cross of the Redeemer
- Kingdom of Italy:
  - Grand Cross of Saints Maurice and Lazarus
  - Grand Cross of the Crown of Italy
  - (Tuscany) Tuscan Grand Ducal Family: Grand Cross of St. Joseph
- Holy See: Grand Cross of the Order of Pope Pius IX
- Empire of Japan: Grand Cordon of the Rising Sun
- Luxembourg:
  - Knight of the Gold Lion of Nassau
  - Grand Cross of the Oak Crown
- Monaco: Grand Cross of St. Charles
- Netherlands: Grand Cross of the Netherlands Lion
- Norway: Grand Cross of St. Olav, 2 July 1890
- Ottoman Empire:
  - Order of Osmanieh, 1st Class
  - Order of the Medjidie, 1st Class
  - Order of Glory
- Persian Empire:
  - Order of the August Portrait
  - Order of the Lion and the Sun, 1st Class
- Kingdom of Portugal:
  - Grand Cross of Our Lady of Conception
  - Grand Cross of the Royal Military Order of St. Benedict of Aviz
- Qing dynasty: Order of the Double Dragon, Class I Grade III
- Kingdom of Romania: Grand Cross of the Star of Romania
- Russian Empire:
  - Knight of St. Andrew
  - Knight of St. Alexander Nevsky, in Brilliants
  - Knight of St. Anna, 1st Class in Brilliants
  - Knight of St. Vladimir, 2nd Class with Star
- Kingdom of Serbia:
  - Grand Cross of the White Eagle
  - Grand Cross of the Cross of Takovo
- Siam: Grand Cross of the White Elephant
- Spain: Grand Cross of the Order of Charles III, with Collar, 12 July 1900
- Sweden:
  - Commander Grand Cross of the Polar Star, 16 August 1873
  - Commander Grand Cross of the Order of Vasa, 31 August 1888
  - Knight of the Seraphim, 6 June 1908
- United Kingdom: Honorary Grand Cross of the Royal Victorian Order, 23 November 1899

== Literature ==
- Born, Karl Erich (1959). "Eulenburg, August Ludwig Traugott Graf zu". Neue Deutsche Biographie (in German). Vol. 4. Berlin: Duncker & Humblot. ISBN 3-428-00185-0.
- Kocka, Jürgen; Neugebauer, Wolfgang, eds. (2001). Acta Borussica Neue Folge (PDF) (in German). Vol. 9.
