= Botho zu Eulenburg =

Prussian politician (1831–1912)

Count Botho zu Eulenburg
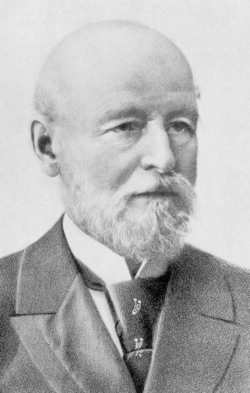

Minister-President of Prussia
- In office 22 March 1892 – 26 October 1894
- Monarch: Wilhelm II
- Preceded by: Count Leo von Caprivi
- Succeeded by: Prince Chlodwig zu Hohenlohe-Schillingsfürst

Personal details
- Born: 31 July 1831 Wicken, Province of Prussia, Kingdom of Prussia
- Died: 5 February 1912 (aged 80) Berlin, Kingdom of Prussia, German Empire
- Spouse: Elisabeth von Alvensleben
- Children: Botho zu Eulenburg (1879–1881)
- Relatives: August zu Eulenburg (brother); Philipp zu Eulenburg (second cousin)
- Occupation: Jurist

Botho Wendt August Graf zu Eulenburg (31 July 1831 – 5 February 1912) was a Prussian statesman. Throughout the entire German Empire period he was, alongside Albrecht von Roon the only Minister President of Prussia not also to be Chancellor of Germany, with the two offices being practically synonymous.

== Early life and career ==
Eulenburg was born in Wicken (now in Pravdinsky District) to Botho Heinrich zu Eulenburg (1804–1879) and his wife, Countess Therese née von Dönhoff (1806–1882). He studied law at the universities of Königsberg and Bonn.

Eulenburg worked in high positions of the Prussian and German administration in Wiesbaden (1869–1872), Metz (president of the Département de la Lorraine; 1872–1873) and Oberpräsident of the Province of Hanover (1873–1878). In March 1878, Eulenburg succeeded his first cousin once removed Friedrich Albrecht zu Eulenburg as Minister of the Interior, serving under Bismarck. He implemented a series of repressive anti-socialist measures. From 1881 to 1892, he was the Oberpräsident of the Province of Hesse-Nassau.

== Minister-President of Prussia ==
In 1892, he was appointed Minister-President of Prussia in succession to Leo von Caprivi, who however remained chancellor of Germany.

Though Caprivi had recommended the experienced administrator Eulenburg for this appointment, the new Minister-President soon made life difficult for Caprivi, and often thought of pressing for his removal. Both Caprivi and Eulenburg were eventually dismissed by Wilhelm II following the renewal of anti-Socialist moves (and an anti-subversion bill) in 1894. Eulenburg often thought of himself as the only possible successor to Caprivi, and he was extremely unhappy to be dismissed at what he regarded as the moment of his destiny.

From 1899 until his death, Eulenburg was a member of the Prussian House of Lords. He died in Berlin in 1912 and is buried in No. I cemetery of Trinity Church, Berlin-Kreuzberg.

== Personal life and family ==
Eulenburg was the older brother of August zu Eulenburg, Marshal of the Prussian royal court, and a second cousin of Prince Philip of Eulenburg, a close friend of Wilhelm II, German Emperor, and an instrumental figure behind the scenes of German politics.

On 25 October 1875, he married at Neustadt, West Prussia Elisabeth von Alvensleben (22 September 1834 in Brandenburg/Havel – 5 September 1919 in Neustadt), by whom he had an only son, Botho (15 February 1879 in Berlin – 30 May 1881 in Berlin).

== Honours ==
He received the following orders and decorations:

- Kingdom of Prussia:
  - Knight of the Black Eagle, with Collar 13 July 1893
  - Order of Merit of the Prussian Crown
  - Grand Cross of the Red Eagle, with Crown, Oak Leaves and Swords on Ring
  - Grand Commander's Star of the Royal House Order of Hohenzollern, with Swords and Diamonds
  - Iron Cross (1870), 2nd Class on White Band with Black Edge
  - Red Cross Medal, 2nd Class
  - Landwehr Service Medal, 1st Class
  - Knight of Justice of the Johanniter Order
- Duchy of Anhalt: Grand Cross of Albert the Bear
- Denmark: Grand Cross of the Dannebrog, 30 July 1890
- (Saxe-Coburg and Gotha) (Duchy of Saxe-Altenburg) (Saxe-Meiningen) Ernestine duchies: Grand Cross of the Saxe-Ernestine House Order
- Grand Duchy of Hesse: Grand Cross of the Ludwig Order
- Netherlands: Grand Cross of the Netherlands Lion
- Persian Empire: Order of the Lion and the Sun, 1st Class
- Russian Empire: Knight of St. Stanislaus, 2nd Class with Star
- Kingdom of Saxony: Grand Cross of the Albert Order, with Silver Star
- Kingdom of Serbia: Grand Cross of the White Eagle
- Principality of Waldeck and Pyrmont: Order of Merit, 1st Class

Government offices
Preceded by Karl Heinrich von Boetticher	Oberpräsident of Hanover; 1873 – 1878	Succeeded by Adolf Hilmar von Leipzig
Preceded by August von Ende	Oberpräsident of Hesse-Nassau; 1881 – 1892	Succeeded by Eduard von Magdeburg
Political offices
Preceded by Count Friedrich Albrecht zu Eulenburg	Interior Minister of Prussia; 1878 – 1881	Succeeded by Robert von Puttkamer
Preceded by Count Leo von Caprivi	Prime Minister of Prussia; 1892 – 1894	Succeeded by Prince Chlodwig zu Hohenlohe-Schillingsfürst
Preceded by Count Ludwig Herrfurt	Interior Minister of Prussia; 1892 – 1894	Succeeded by Ernst von Koeller
