= Philipp, Prince of Eulenburg =

Diplomat and composer of Imperial Germany

Philipp
- Prince of Eulenburg and Hertefeld; Count of Sandels
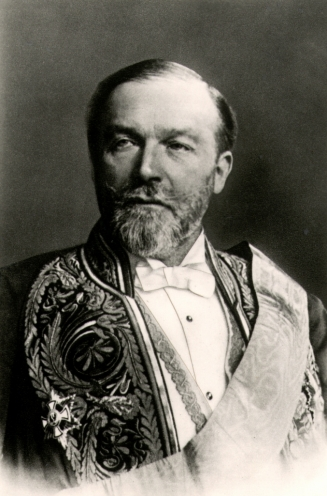
- Full name: Philip Frederick Alexander
- Born: Philipp Friedrich Karl Alexander Botho Graf zu Eulenburg; 12 February 1847; Königsberg, Kingdom of Prussia
- Died: 17 September 1921 (aged 74); Liebenberg, Löwenberger Land, Germany
- Spouse: Augusta Sandels
- Father: Count Philipp Konrad zu Eulenburg
- Mother: Baroness Alexandrine of Rothkirch and Panthen

Philipp, Prince of Eulenburg and Hertefeld, Count of Sandels (12 February 1847 – 17 September 1921) was a diplomat of the German Empire who achieved considerable influence as close friend of Wilhelm II, German Emperor. On 1 January 1900, the Emperor created the then count an hereditary prince (Fürst).

He was the central member of the Liebenberg Circle, a group of artistically minded aristocrats within the entourage of Wilhelm II. Eulenburg played an important role in the rise of Bernhard von Bülow, but fell from power in 1907 due to a sexual scandal.

== Early life and education ==
Eulenburg was born at Königsberg, Province of Prussia, the eldest son of Philipp Konrad, Count zu Eulenburg (Königsberg, 24 April 1820 – Berlin, 5 March 1889) and his wife, Baroness Alexandrine von Rothkirch und Panthen (Glogau, 20 June 1824 – Meran, 11 April 1902). The Eulenburgs were a Junker family which belonged to Germany's Uradel (ancient nobility) class as they were first recorded as Ministeriales of Saxony in the service of the Margraves of Meissen in 1181, they acquired lordships in Meissen, Bohemia and Lusatia before migrating to Prussia in the 14th century, there being recognized as Barons in 1709 and Counts by 1786. For generations the family had served the House of Hohenzollern; Philipp's uncle Friedrich Albrecht zu Eulenburg served as Interior Minister of Prussia, as did his cousin Botho zu Eulenburg. The Eulenburgs, though "Junkers", were impoverished aristocracy and until 1867 depended entirely upon Philipp von Eulenburg's salary as a captain in the Prussian Army. In 1867 Baron Karl von Hertefeld died without any children or surviving siblings, and in his will left his entire fortune and two gigantic estates at Liebenberg and Hertefeld to his favorite grand niece, Eulenburg's mother. At one stroke, the Eulenburgs become one of the richest families in Prussia, but Captain von Eulenburg was unable to overcome his long years in poverty, and he had a miserly attitude to spending money. Eulenburg had difficult relations with his father, but was extremely close to his artistic mother. She was a great piano-player, and frequently invited over Cosima von Bülow to play the piano for her. Cosima von Bülow in turn became first the mistress and then the wife of the composer Richard Wagner. Through this family connection, Eulenburg was close to the Wagner family and a member of the Bayreuth Circle that existed to further the Wagner cult.

Eulenburg was educated at a French grammar school in Berlin before being educated by a tutor from 1859 onwards. Starting in 1863, he attended the Vitzhumsches Gymnasium in Dresden, Saxony. In 1866 the Austro-Prussian War forced him to leave Saxony, which was now enemy territory. Though he did not relish a military career, he joined the Prussian Gardes du Corps as an officer cadet in accordance with his father's wishes. He then attended the War Academy at Kassel from which he graduated in 1868. During his time at the War Academy, Eulenburg become very close to Count Kuno von Moltke, who would also be exposed as homosexual in the 1907 scandal. In 1867 Eulenburg was promoted to the rank of lieutenant before resigning his commission in 1869 in order to pursue an education in the law. When France declared war on Prussia in July 1870, Eulenburg rejoined the Prussian Army. During the Franco-German War of 1870-1871 he served under the German military governor of Strasbourg and received the Iron Cross. In October 1871, Eulenburg again resigned from the army to resume his legal studies.

After the Franco-Prussian War, Eulenburg travelled for a year in the Orient as the Middle East was then called, a trip which ended when Eulenburg contracted typhus in Egypt. From 1872 to 1875, he attended the University of Leipzig and the University of Strasbourg studying the law. While a student at Leipzig, Eulenburg befriended Baron Axel "Dachs" von Varnbüler, who was to become one of Eulenburg's most important friends. Varnbüler would later recall that Eulenburg was one of the most accomplished students at the university, being "the most versatile, easily the most brilliant and therefore the leading spirit" on the campus.

In 1875 Eulenburg received a Juris Doctor degree from the University of Giessen. After graduating magna cum laude Eulenburg went to Stockholm to marry a wealthy Swedish aristocrat, Countess Augusta Sandels, whom he had been courting via a series of love letters for some time.

== Early career ==
Eulenburg became very close to the French diplomat, writer and racist Count Arthur de Gobineau, whom Eulenburg was later to call his "unforgettable friend". Eulenburg, who was fluent in French, was deeply impressed by Gobineau's book An Essay on the Inequality of the Human Races, where Gobineau expounded the theory of an Aryan master-race and maintained that the people who had best preserved Aryan blood were the Germans. A snob who held commoners in contempt, Gobineau believed that French aristocrats like himself were descendants of the Germanic Franks who had conquered the Roman province of Gaul in the 5th century, whereas ordinary French people were descendants of Latin and Celtic peoples. Though domestic French political considerations led Gobineau to claim that the Germans were the best Aryans, this thesis ensured that the book had a favorable reception in Germany. Eulenburg sought out Gobineau to personally thank him for his book, and a friendship between the two men blossomed as a result. Eulenburg first met Gobineau in Stockholm in 1874, and the two immediately struck it off. Eulenburg was later to fondly recall how he and Gobineau had spent hours during their time in Sweden under the "Nordic sky, where the old world of the gods lived on in the customs and habits of the people as well in their hearts." Gobineau in turn was later to write that only two people in the entire world had ever properly understood his racist philosophy, namely Richard Wagner and Eulenburg. Gobineau encouraged Eulenburg to promote his theory of an Aryan master-race, telling him: "In this way you will help many people understand things sooner". The American historian Gregory Blue wrote of an "Eulenburg connection" in promoting anti-Asian racism, observing much of Eulenburg's "Yellow Peril" seemed to be taken straight from Gobineau's anti-Asian writings.

Eulenburg needed no encouragement and spent the rest of his life promoting racist and anti-Semitic views, writing in his 1906 book Eine Erinneruung an Graf Arthur de Gobineau (A Memoir of Count Arthur de Gobineau) that Gobineau was a prophet who showed Germany the way forward to national greatness in the 20th century. In 1885, when the editor of the Bayreuther Blätter, the official newspaper of the Wagner cult, wrote to Eulenburg asking that he allow his letters to Gobineau to be published in the newspaper, Eulenburg wrote back to say that he could not publish his correspondence with Gobineau as their letters "touch on so many intimate matters that I cannot extract much from them which is of general interest". Later, Eulenburg was to complain that all of his letters to Gobineau had been destroyed because "They contain too much of an intimately personal nature". The British historian John C. G. Röhl has written that we cannot know for certain what the Eulenburg-Gobineau letters had to say since both of them burned almost all of their correspondence, but it is possible that they had a sexual relationship that was documented in the letters and motivated their destruction.

Eulenbug's politics veered to the extreme right. An ardent racist and anti-Semite, he was fascinated by the racial theories not just of Gobineau but also of Wagner and Houston Stewart Chamberlain. Like many other Prussian conservatives of his generation, Eulenburg always saw the unification of Germany in 1871 under the leadership of Prussia as a fragile achievement, and he was haunted by the prospect that German unification might be undone. Accordingly, he always argued that the Prussian state had to be ruthless when dealing with any sort of internal or external threat, and therefore Eulenburg completely rejected democracy. Eulenburg was quite open in his contempt for the "open" political systems of France and Britain, stating that a "closed" political system was much to be preferred.

== Diplomat and artist ==
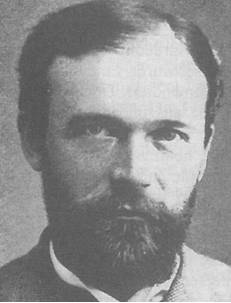
Philipp of Eulenburg (1882)

Eulenburg joined the Prussian civil service. He served first as a judge at a lower court in Lindow, Brandenburg, before being promoted to a higher court at Neuruppin. After only two years as a judge he transferred to the Auswärtiges Amt (Foreign Office). In January 1881, Eulenburg was appointed Third Secretary at the German embassy in Paris, serving under Second Secretary Bernhard von Bülow, who was to become another of Eulenburg's friends. Eulenburg—by all accounts an extremely sensitive man—was devastated by the death of his two-year-old daughter Astrid from diabetes on 23 March 1881, and asked to leave Paris, stating that he could not stand living in the city where his daughter had died.

After only six months in Paris, he was transferred to the Prussian embassy to the Kingdom of Bavaria, in Munich, where he served seven years. Eulenburg had little interest in his job, and spent most of his time absorbed in the cultural scene in Munich. The then Bavarian King, Ludwig II, lived a secluded life at Linderhof Palace in the Bavarian mountains, receiving no guests and attending no events in Munich. Thus, even diplomats had no opportunity to be received by him or to meet him. Extremely curious to see the famous monarch, the great benefactor of Richard Wagner and builder of "fairytale castles", Eulenburg traveled to Linderhof with a friend, where he stood by the access road until the king passed him on his daily carriage ride. Eulenburg doffed his hat, which Ludwig reciprocated. This was his only contact with the "Fairytale King", who died a mysterious death in a lake in 1886 after being placed under a regency.

During his time in Munich, Eulenburg become convinced that he was too sensitive for a career in politics, and increasingly become interested in the arts. In 1884, Eulenburg published an autobiographical story entitled "Aus der Art Eine märkische Geschichte", concerning a sensitive, artistic young man with a loving mother and a cold father who pushes the young man to pursue a military career when he really wants a career in the arts, something that his mother understands. In his letters to his mother, Eulenburg always identified his "real self" with her, whom he stated could understand him in a way that his father never could. Eulenburg was later to write that of his father: "He was suffused with the prosaic ethos of Prussia, and inevitably he sought to steer me in a similar direction, when so much inspiration lay dormant in my imagination." Of his mother, Eulenburg wrote: "My mother, whom I deeply adored, the ideal figure who filled my whole being with boundless love, fired my inspiration. Music, painting, poetry occupied her thoughts and she practised the arts with talent and with understanding, and they took full possession of me as well."

Keenly interested in music, Eulenburg enjoyed considerable success as a writer of ballads. Eulenburg wrote a series of "Nordic-mystical" ballads such as Atlantis, Gorm, Frühlinsmacht, Altnordisches Wiegendlied, Märchen von der Freiheit, and Skaldengsänge. The most successful of Eulenburg's musical works were the Rose songs, what the German historian Norman Domier called a series of "saccharine and kitschy" sentimental love songs which were extremely popular with the public and sold over 500,000 copies. Besides composing music, Eulenburg was also a playwright. His first play, Margot, was a success when it premiered in Munich in 1885, and his second play, Der Seestern (The Starfish), was an even bigger success when it premiered in Berlin in 1887.

=== The Kaiser's great friend ===
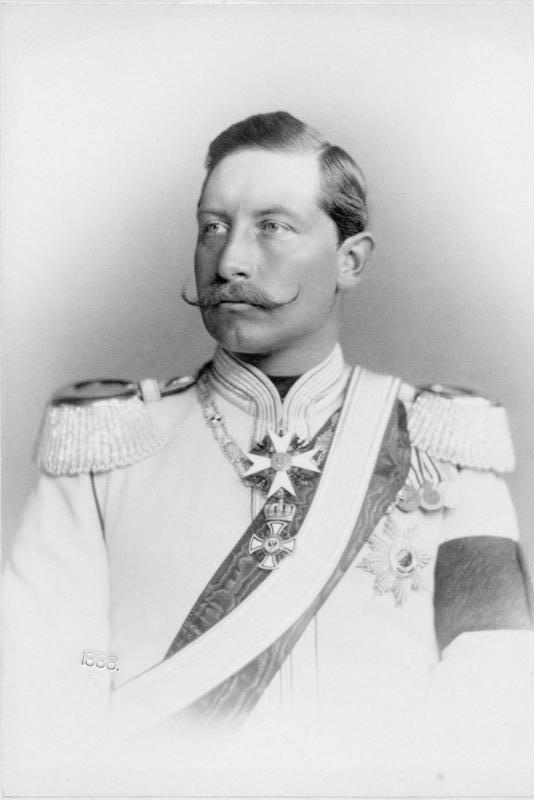
Wilhelm II in the year of his accession to the throne in 1888

Count Eulenburg was invited to accompany Prince Wilhelm of Prussia on a hunting trip on 19 April 1886. Wilhelm was the eldest son of Germany's Crown Prince Friedrich, and the future Kaiser Wilhelm II. This meeting changed Eulenberg's life. Eulenburg soon became best friends with the prince (who was twelve years his junior), and they remained so for the next 22 years. After meeting him, Eulenburg declared his "boundless love" for the prince. A friendship developed between the two, in which the count, with his worldly wisdom, was to offer the young, impetuous and nervous prince both emotional support and intellectual distraction. Eulenburg also offered him the spiritual warmth that the prince hadn't found with his parents or at the Prussian royal court. During this period, Eulenburg started to share his love of the occult with his new best friend. In August 1887, Eulenburg wrote to Prince Wilhelm about a séance he had recently organized, that "I was overjoyed that we find ourselves in agreement in this area as well, and it has shown me clearly yet again how very lucky I have been to meet Your Royal Highness! To be understood in all things so well, that is true happiness!" In the same letter, Eulenburg warned Wilhelm never to speak in public about their shared interest in the occult as most people would not understand it.

In 1888, the old Emperor Wilhelm I died. He was succeeded by his son Friedrich, who died of throat cancer just 99 days later, to be succeeded by Wilhelm II. As the Emperor Friedrich III lay in his bed dying, Wilhelm demanded that he be appointed regent, a request his mother the Empress Victoria refused. Wilhelm, who had always hated his parents, especially his British mother, wrote to Eulenburg that "the royal escutcheon had been besmirched and the Reich brought to ruin by the English princess who is my mother, that is the most horrible of all!" In March 1888, Eulenburg wrote to his mother: "I am very aware of the fact that it is, and always will be, a question [for me] of either state service or art." Upon Wilhelm's accession to the throne, Eulenburg assumed an unofficial position of immense influence. Among other things, he was instrumental in the appointment of Bernhard von Bülow as head of the foreign office in 1897. Wilhelm II had long desired the appointment of "his own Bismarck" – a powerful chancellor who would enact the Kaiser's will – and Eulenburg was the first to suggest Bülow for this role.

In October 1888, when Wilhelm had decided to appoint Eulenburg the Prussian Ambassador to Bavaria, Eulenburg viewed the appointment as a chance to better pursue his artistic interests. In a letter to his mother, Eulenburg wrote:

"I do not let go of the thought expressed here, and in my fairly regular letters to him [Wilhelm II] I return to it! It would be a very wonderful thing for my future to get such an appointment. For apart from the agreeable material aspects, I would hope that no-one would then ask more of me than this, and I could devote myself in peace to the things to which I am really attached."

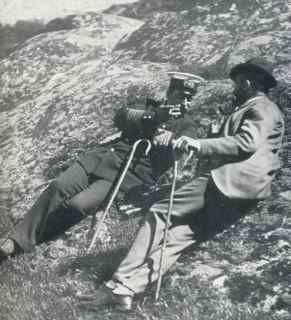
The Emperor and Eulenburg on one of their cruises in Norway, 1890

The German Chancellor Otto von Bismarck blocked the planned appointment, writing about Eulenburg that "I like him personally; he is amiable, but politically he has little sense of what is important and what is not; he allows himself to be influenced by carping gossip, passes it on and this way needlessly puts people’s backs up." Bismarck stated Eulenburg was acceptable as ambassador to a small, unimportant state like Oldenburg, but was "impossible" for a major state like Bavaria. Thanks to Bismarck, in November 1888, Eulenburg was appointed the Prussian ambassador to Oldenburg, instead of Bavaria as he wanted. In the fall of 1888, Bismarck wrote in a letter to his son that there were aspects to the Eulenburg-Wilhelm relationship that he did "not wish to commit to paper. I will not write down very much that I want to talk to you about." In 1888, Herbert von Bismarck wrote "that H.M. [His Majesty] loves Ph. Eulenburg more than any other living being." Despite liking Eulenburg to a certain extent, Bismarck wrote with contempt that: "Eulenburg's projects were those of an average dilettantism. His diplomatic activities were 'operetta politics' with the hastily changing plans of the romantic. What else can one expect from someone who sings?" Bismarck was referring to Eulenburg's love of Italianate bel canto singing; Eulenburg had by all accounts a fine singing voice, and he often entertained guests at the parties he hosted at Liebenberg with his singing. Eulenburg's distaste for politics was for openly holding political power, and he much preferred to operate behind-the-scenes to achieve his goals. Eulenburg's cultural work served as a way of promoting his brand of "aesthetic anti-Semitism" to the German middle class, a set of values and assumptions about Germans and Jews that Eulenburg wanted to see ordinary people accept.

=== Conspiracy theorist and spiritualist ===
Eulenberg was a convinced anti-Catholic bigot who saw the Catholic Church as a sinister force plotting the ruin of Protestant Prussia. He developed an elaborate conspiracy theory.

Since Germany had been unified under the leadership of Protestant Prussia in 1871, Eulenburg, like many other Prussian Protestant conservatives, was convinced that the Catholic Church was out to break up the unified Reich and turn Germany back into a collection of independent states.

Archduke Franz Ferdinand, heir to the Austrian throne, was a devout Catholic whom Eulenburg personally disliked. Eulenberg believed that the Mayerling Incident of 1889, when the previous Austrian heir, Archduke Rudolf, killed himself and his mistress, had actually been murder by agents of the Vatican, that Franz Ferdinand was a puppet of the Vatican, and that he was plotting to start a war against Germany in alliance with Russia and France when he succeeded to the Austrian throne. The purpose of this planned religious war was to break up Germany, and establish the supremacy of a Catholic league led by Austria and also Bavaria (as "the Catholic hegemonial power") over Prussia. Eulenburg further believed that elements of the Bavarian government and the Zentrum were also involved in this Catholic conspiracy. To block this alleged Catholic plot, Eulenburg insisted that the Reich government never co-operate with the Zentrum in any way or form, and insure that the pro-Prussian Liberal party stayed in power in Bavaria. This last meant that the Reich government had to avoid extreme conservative policies that would alienate the Bavarian Liberals.

Thus Eulenburg, whose leanings were towards the extreme right, advocated moderate conservative policies. This contradiction was captured in an 1896 essay in which he complained that the "sorest spot of the new German Reich" was that unfortunately the "old Prussian tradition" had to adjust to "the liberalism of the German Philistine" (i.e. the middle class).

Aside from the arts, Eulenburg's major interest was the occult. Eulenburg—while nominally Lutheran—genuinely believed in the reality of ghosts and spirits, and spent much of his time consulting clairvoyants, mediums, and spiritualists in attempts to contact the spirit world. After Eulenburg moved from Munich to Oldenburg in 1888, Count Kuno Rantzau wrote: "I wish Eulenburg all the best, but I am heartily glad that he can now play his spiritist mumbo-jumbo in a different settling." In February 1889, when Eulenburg's sister wrote to him complaining that his spiritualist activities were likely to embarrass the Kaiser, Eulenburg wrote back to say: "Your concern about the Kaiser's spiritualism is quite unnecessary. When he was still Prince Wilhelm, we spoke about these matters -- just as you speak about everything to the person who is your friend. How can the Kaiser now suddenly stop talking about them? ...I cannot help the fact that, by the time I got to know him, Prince Wilhelm already firmly believed in ghosts and other such things; it is a part of his mystical inclination."

=== Political role and the fall of Bismarck ===
As the best friend of the new emperor and his closest advisor, many people started to court Eulenburg as a man who could bring access to the Kaiser, most importantly Friedrich von Holstein, the director of the Political Department at the Auswärtiges Amt. He was determined to depose Bismarck as chancellor, and saw Eulenburg as a useful conduit to Wilhelm II. Despite his distaste for politics and his love of the arts, Eulenburg's role as Wilhelm's best friend ensured that he played a leading political role, most notably in the intrigues that brought down Bismarck in 1890.

Even though Eulenburg felt he was too fragile for the world of politics, he felt obliged to become a political player out of his love for Wilhelm II. In response to a letter from Wilhelm in 1890, Eulenburg wrote: "Your Majesty has thrown me into transports of joy with his gracious letter with its rich contents, and I must take the greatest care to control myself so that I do not write four pages expressing my gratitude! Your Majesty knows very well -- without my saying it -- what feelings gripped me when I saw the beloved handwriting!" In the summer of 1889, the anti-Bismarck faction learned that the Chancellor was planning to permit the return of the Congregation of the Most Holy Redeemer of Catholic priests, who had been banished from Germany during the Kulturkampf. The return of the Redemptorists was seen as an attempt by Bismarck to break up the Kartell of the anti-clerical National Liberals and the Conservative parties. That would make it impossible for the government to pass bills in the Reichstag, and thereby place Wilhelm in a "position of constraint" by making Bismarck indispensable to resolve the crisis.

In fall 1889, Holstein attempted to frustrate this manoeuvre by having Eulenburg arrange for Wilhelm to issue a press statement in favour of the Kartell. When Bismarck ignored the press statement, Holstein had Eulenburg send two telegrams to the Kaiser, who was visiting Constantinople, which led in turn to Wilhelm sending a telegram to Bismarck on 6 November 1889 saying that "under no circumstances and in no way whatsoever can and will His Imperial Majesty permit the return of the Redemptorists to Germany." Checked in this manoeuvre, Bismarck proceed to destroy the Kartell by bringing a new Anti-Socialist Bill, which led to the moderate right-of-the-center parties suffering heavy losses in the elections of 20 February 1890.

With the government unable to pass bills through the Reichstag, Bismarck then launched plans for a coup d'état with the aim of making himself dictator. Bismarck's plans threw the anti-Bismarck faction into feverish plans of their own, and on 11 March 1890 Holstein telegraphed Eulenburg that he was needed in Berlin immediately. On 14 March, Eulenburg passed on a message to Wilhelm warning him of Bismarck's plans, which led to Bismarck being replaced as chancellor on the following day. Röhl wrote that in the great crisis of March 1890, Eulenburg played the role of an emissary more than as a planner, but nonetheless he did play a key role in Bismarck's dismissal.

== The Power Broker ==
In the chancellorship of General Leo von Caprivi, Eulenburg came more into his own as a political player. In April 1891 Eulenburg returned to Munich, this time as Prussian ambassador to the Kingdom of Bavaria. On 15 February 1891, Baron Karl von Dörnberg, one of Eulenburg's friends, died. After his death, Count Kuno von Moltke wrote to Axel "Dachs" von Varnbüler on 31 March 1891:

"My old Dachs! I am just getting ready for the journey to Stuttgart. I'm longing for old Philine...have to see her [Eulenburg; his homosexual gay friends always used the terms "her" and "she" to describe him] because of the feeling that now this gap [Dörnberg's death] has opened up in our beloved circle, we must hold on to each other doubly, more firmly...Then I'll move over to Munich with P. on the 8th -- the family will not follow till later".

The "Philine" of this letter is clearly Eulenburg because on 8 April 1891, Eulenburg accompanied by Moltke took a train trip from Stuttgart to Munich and on 10 April 1891 he appeared at the Bavarian court as the new Prussian envoy. After arriving in Munich, Eulenburg and Moltke went to see a clairvoyant to learn the future and improve Eulenburg's health. Moltke wrote to Varnbüler afterwards: "Philine writes to me that he feels absolutely dreadful -- in spite of the clairvoyante who felt him in the rectum and gave him such helpful guidelines for his behavior". At the same time, Eulenburg continued his efforts to involve the Kaiser in his spiritism and his attempts to contact the spirit world. On 18 November 1891, Field Marshal Alfred von Waldersee wrote in his diary:

"In the highest place it is believed that it is possible to rule alone, to understand everything, to know everything best, while in reality no aim is clearly understood, nothing is properly understood...Is that really too bleak a view? Only today I have the learned the following for the first time. Philipp Eulenburg was earlier strongly urged not to strengthen the Kaiser in his spiritist leanings. During the first North Sea cruise he kept to this, as I was able to observe in detail. Apparently things had already changed by the time of the second cruise. During his last visit to Munich the monarch was brought into direct contact with a female spiritist by Eulenburg, I guess in the Legation hotel. While she was in a trance she was asked by the Kaiser, of whose presence she was allegedly unaware, what he was to make of a friend in Russia -- obviously an allusion to the Tsar. If the lord can be influenced in this way, the well-being of the Fatherland lies irretrievably in the hands of swindlers. Friedrich Wilhelm II and Bischoffwerder!"

In December 1891, Eulenburg was delighted when a spiritist was apparently able to tell him of what Wilhelm had written to him in his last letter, which confirmed his belief in the power of the ghosts and spirits whose aid he sought.

In January 1892, the Zentrum announced that they would vote for an Army Bill in the Reichstag, and in exchange they wanted Wilhelm as King of Prussia to bring in a School bill in Prussia favorable to Catholic education. A deal was made by Caprivi to that effect, which led to Eulenburg writing to Wilhelm on 21 January 1892 warning that relying upon a "black-blue" alliance (i.e. Zentrum-Conservative) was dangerous to the Reich, which led to Wilhelm doing a U-turn on the bargain, saying he would "never consent" to a School bill being passed in the Prussian Landtag by a "black-blue" alliance. Afterwards, Eulenburg advised Wilhelm to have the Prussian School Bill amended so it could be passed by a Conservative-National Liberal alliance by removing the clauses favourable to Catholic education it would appeal to the anti-clerical National Liberals. Eulenburg's role as the "backseat driver" of German politics led Caprivi to submit his resignation on 17 March 1892, complaining it was impossible to govern when the Kaiser's best friend had more influence on policy-making than did the Chancellor; Caprivi's resignation was refused. In July 1892, Wilhelm received a report from the American journalist-cum-German spy Poultney Bigelow that the majority of Polish aristocrats in Russian Poland would welcome a German invasion and the establishment of a German protectorate in Congress Poland. Wilhelm welcomed Bigelow's report, which led him to comment to Eulenburg on the correctness of Caprivi's policy of allowing German Poles to study in Polish-language schools, which he believed was winning opinion in Russian Poland towards Germany. Wilhelm was then persuaded by Eulenburg that any sort of Polish state—even a German protectorate—was bound to trigger Polish nationalist feelings amongst Germany's Polish minority, and as such, not only should the Reich decline to support anti-Russian Polish nationalists, but it was best to Germanize the Polish minority within Germany. In 1893, when the Zentrum threatened to vote against the Army Bill in the Reichstag, Holstein devised a plan where the German government would pay a bribe to Pope Leo XIII in exchange for which the Pope would order the Zentrum to vote for the Army Bill under the pain of excommunication. As Caprivi was opposed to this plan, saying it was highly dishonorable for the Reich government to engage in bribery to achieve its goals, Holstein had Eulenburg contact Wilhelm to order Caprivi to offer the bribe. Within two days, Eulenburg reported to Holstein that his efforts had paid off and the Kaiser had ordered a deeply reluctant Caprivi to offer the bribe. In December 1893 there appeared in Kladderadatsch a series of satirical poems attacking the dominant figures at the Auswärtiges Amt as "Oyster friend" (Holstein), "Späzle" (Alfred von Kiderlen-Waechter), "the Troubadour" (Eulenburg) and the mysterious "fourth man" (Varnbüler) provoked much media speculation about just who were these figures meant to be. The poems were the work of two diplomats, Bothmer and Raschdau who did not belong to the dominant faction and were frustrated that their careers were going nowhere.

By early 1894, Eulenburg's power had grown to such an extent that he was no longer acting just as an ally to Holstein, but had sufficient power to start acting as a power broker on his own who could overrule Holstein when he felt fit. Eulenburg and Holstein had been allies in the intrigues against Bismarck in 1889–1890, had co-operated afterwards in the early 1890s, but by 1894 Eulenburg and Holstein were starting to disagree more and more. Eulenburg had one of his cousins, August zu Eulenburg, appointed High Marshal of the Court in 1890 and another cousin, Botho zu Eulenburg, appointed Prussian Minister-President in 1892. Eulenburg's old friend Count Kuno von Moltke was appointed military aide-de-camp to the Kaiser in 1893 while another old friend from university, Axel von Varnbüler, become Federal Council Plenipotentiary in 1894. Finally, Eulenburg's old friend from his days in Paris in 1881, Bernhard von Bülow, was appointed ambassador to Italy. In 1893, Eulenburg had himself appointed ambassador to Austria-Hungary. Eulenburg and Bülow developed a secret code for communicating with one another, so that those diplomats loyal to Holstein would not be able to read their correspondence. The most prestigious positions in the Auswärtiges Amt in the 19th century were the "grand embassies" in London, Paris, Madrid, Rome, Vienna, St. Petersburg and Constantinople. Since Germany was allied to Austria in the Dual Alliance and to both Austria and Italy in the Triple Alliance, the embassies in Vienna and Rome were considered to be the most important of the "grand embassies". With Bülow as ambassador to Italy and Eulenburg the ambassador to Austria, the Bülow-Eulenburg clique had a strong position in the Auswärtiges Amt. As the power of the Bülow-Eulenburg clique grew, they came into increasing conflict with the Holstein group. The differences in Eulenburg's relations between Bülow and Holstein were well illustrated by their tone; cold and formal in the Holstein-Eulenburg letters while warm and full of extravagant praise for each other in the Bülow-Eulenburg letters. For example, on 1 January 1894 Bülow wrote to Eulenburg that: "My innermost thoughts hasten towards you...We must surely have already known and loved each other somewhere in the endless stream of time, for in my soul there is only affinity and friendship for you". Bülow and Eulenburg both had strong mystical-romantic tendencies and had developed the belief that they had once been the same spiritual being, but had now been split into two with Eulenburg being the more feminine, artistic side of this being while Bülow was the more masculine, practical side of this being. Bülow explained this theory to Eulenburg in a letter where he declared:

"As sisters our souls once arose from the mysterious spring of Being; we were simply given different shells and differently colored wings. As the heavenly beings have granted you the magic gift of a rich and brilliant artistic talent, I cannot stand productively by your side in this regard, though I can certainly be gladdened when experiencing what you can give, enjoying your spirit and marveling at you. I, by inclination and upbringing more dependent on historical, legal, economic studies, may be able to pass over to you from the storeroom which I am slowly stocking up, many a piece for the edifice which you, having been thrown into the political struggle against your own inclinations, are nevertheless constructing with a felicitous and certain touch for the benefit of our Kaiser and country".

Bülow's nickname was "Bernard the Obliging", as he was a man who almost never disagreed with Wilhelm even if he believed him to be wrong, and in the words of the German historian Ragnild von Fiebig-von Hase his "...mostly charming, often also ridiculous flatteries were essentially the result of falseness and a shallow, but also extremely ambitious character". Bülow was widely regarded as a man who would say and do literally anything if he thought it would help his career.

Additionally, both Bülow and even more so Eulenburg were strong believers that the egoistical Wilhelm II was indeed correct in his self-estimation of himself as an almost godlike being chosen by fate to make Germany the greatest nation in the world. Bülow's letters to Eulenburg often contained statements such as "The leading ideas of Our Imperial Master are mostly undoubtedly correct; all that is needed is that they should in the future be defended and executed with greater tact" or "The grand aims of Our Most Gracious Master can only be attained if those who have the task of executing the Kaiser's plans possess the ability to do so". To a certain extent, the cynical, ultra-ambitious Bülow—who was obsessed with becoming chancellor—was manipulating Eulenburg with these letters since he knew that gaining Eulenburg's friendship was the best way of gaining the Kaiser's favour, but the mystical Eulenburg genuinely believed that Wilhelm II was an almost flawless character being chosen by some higher supernatural force to make Germany great. Eulenburg wrote about the Kaiser that his important character trait was that he was "the knightly -- reminiscent of the finest time of the Middle Ages, with all its piety and mysticism". Eulenburg added that the Kaiser was also a man of the 20th century, but with him, his modern values were fortunately subordinate to his medieval values.

Those attitudes promoted about the Emperor greatly offended Holstein. Holstein was a conservative who in no way wanted to change the existing system, but he also believed that Germany should be a Rechtsstaat ("law state") that should function according to the laws laid down, and not according to the imperial whim. Holstein wrote in December 1894 in a letter to Eulenburg that Germany was now faced with a choice between a "système de Louis XIV" and the coming 20th century. Holstein wrote that thanks to advisors like Eulenburg Wilhelm was behaving like an absolute monarch who at the current rate would be "far more of an autocrat" than the Russian emperor, and that if things continued on their current course Germany would to have become either a dictatorship or a republic because the current system was "an operetta government, but not one that a European people at the end of the nineteenth century will put up with". Holstein wrote he wanted "a moderate use of a practicable system of constitutional co-operative government, which with the exceptions of St. Petersburg and Constantinople, is in operation in the rest of the European and civilised world". Holstein accused Eulenburg of believing "instinctively...to an autocratic regime no matter whether it be Russian patriarchal or despotisme éclairé on the French model" and that "every political, military and legal question is best decided directly by the Kaiser". Holstein ended his letter with the warning :" See to it that world history does not some day picture you as the evil spirit who was at the side of the imperial traveler when he chose the false path". In response, Eulenburg wrote to Holstein a mystical letter saying: "I am convinced that the Guiding Hand of Providence lies behind this elemental and natural drive of the Kaiser's to direct the affairs of the Kingdom in person. Whether it will ruin us or save us I cannot say. But I find it difficult to believe in the decline of Prussia's star". In 1896, Eulenburg wrote to Bülow saying he would go "through thick and thin" with Wilhelm, and would never betray his master. About Holstein, Eulenburg stated: "The Holstein of 1888, with his old-Prussian loyalty to the monarch, has certainly not turned in 1896 into an anti-monarchist, but he has become a parliamentarian...Sympathy and that feeling that a friend has when his friend encounters misfortune...was something that played no part for him."

=== A new diplomat in Vienna ===
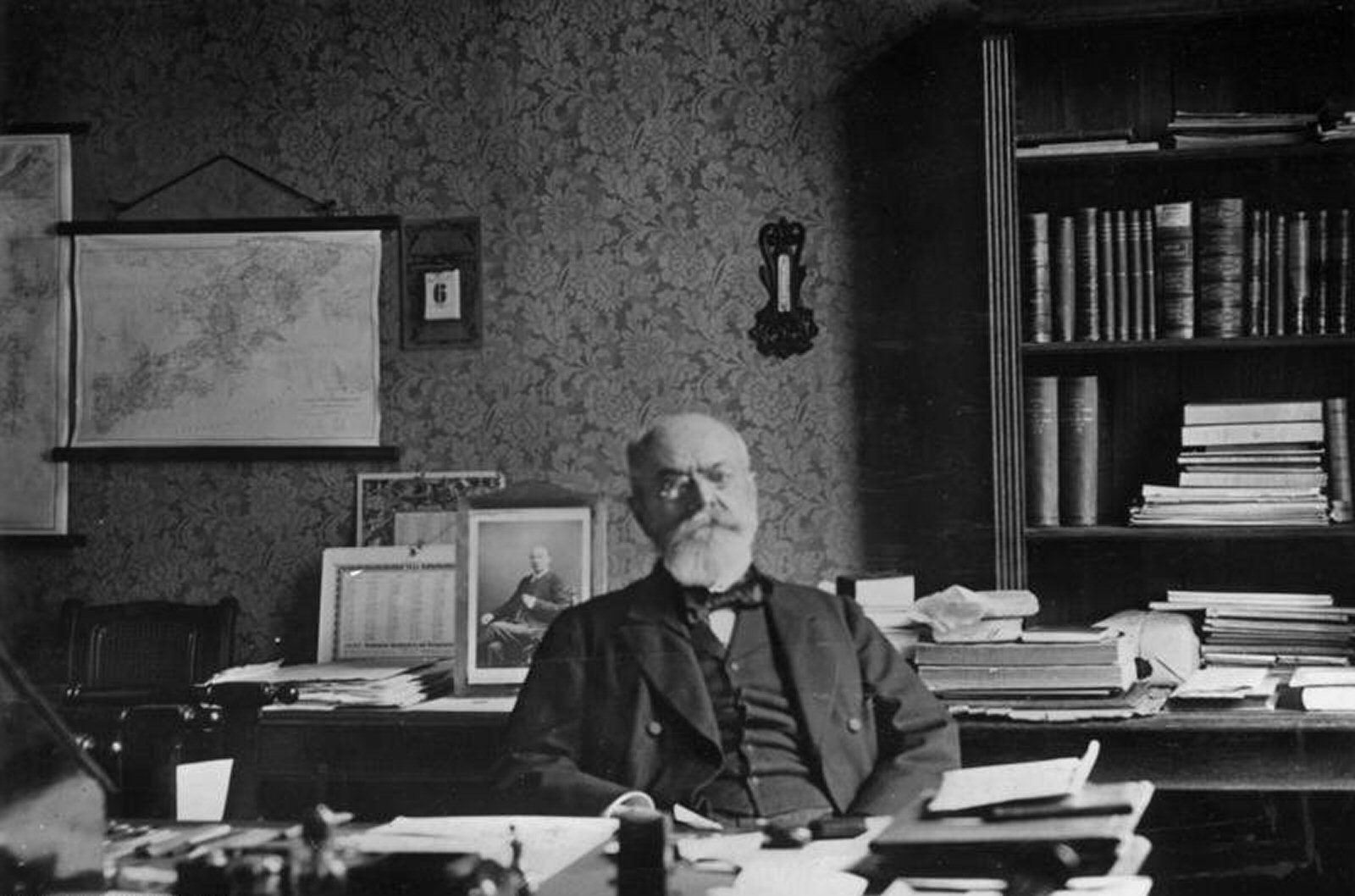
Holstein at the Foreign Office 1906

In 1893 Eulenburg was appointed the German Empire's ambassador to Austria-Hungary, a position he held until 1902. On 20 March 1894 Eulenburg wrote to Wilhelm II advising him to sack Leo von Caprivi as chancellor and to make his friend Bernhard von Bülow foreign minister with the ultimate aim of making Bülow chancellor.

In October 1894 a meeting at Eulenburg's estate Liebenberg Castle in Liebenberg ended with the Kaiser issuing a telegram announcing to Germany that Caprivi was now dismissed as chancellor. Eulenburg wanted his cousin Botho zu Eulenburg to be Caprivi's replacement, but Friedrich von Holstein was able to persuade Wilhelm not to appoint Eulenburg as chancellor.

However, Eulenburg managed to convince Wilhelm to appoint the aged Prince Chlodwig zu Hohenlohe-Schillingsfürst, who was the German Empire's ambassador to France in 1881 when Eulenburg served in the Paris embassy, as the new chancellor. During this time, Eulenburg repeatedly advised Wilhelm II that the best man to be chancellor was Bülow, whom Eulenburg painted in the most glowing terms; he wrote in February 1895 to Wilhelm saying that "Bernhard is the most valuable servant Your Imperial Majesty possesses, the predestined Reich Chancellor of the future".

Between 1895 and 1897, Eulenburg was at the height of his political power, and devised with Wilhelm a set of far-reaching plans intended to neutralize all opposition from those remaining followers of Caprivi within the Reich and Prussian governments, while at the same time intending to give Bülow enough political experience to take over as chancellor within a few years' time. In the summer of 1896 on the annual summer cruise in the North Sea on board the royal yacht SMY Hohenzollern, Eulenburg and Wilhelm worked out what Röhl called "an astonishingly detailed plan" to assert the "personal rule" of the Kaiser.

The three ministers in the Reich and Prussian governments who offered the most resistance to Wilhelm's plans for "personal rule, namely General Walther Bronsart von Schellendorff, Karl Heinrich von Boetticher and Baron Adolf Marschall von Bieberstein should all be quietly fired while Hohenlohe could stay on as a 'shadow Chancellor'". Bülow would be appointed foreign secretary and would be the man really running the government. After a few years' time, the diplomat Bülow—who did not know much about domestic policy—would gain political experience and be appointed chancellor. In the meantime, having Hohenlohe as the "shadow Chancellor" would ensure that any mistakes Bülow made in domestic policy could always be blamed on Hohenlohe.

If Hohenlohe refused the first option, then he would be fired as well, and Botho zu Eulenburg would be appointed Chancellor with Bülow as Foreign Secretary. After a few years' time, Eulenburg would be replaced as chancellor with Bülow.

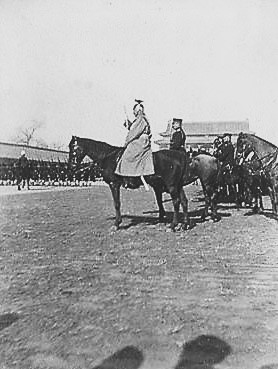
Count Waldersee in China

If Hohenlohe and his followers went public with their complaints against the Kaiser for dismissing them, Wilhelm would declare martial law and appoint Field Marshal Alfred von Waldersee as chancellor with Bülow again as foreign secretary. After some years of military dictatorship, Bülow would be appointed chancellor in a revived "constitutional" regime.

Prince Hohenlohe-Schillingsfürst stayed on as chancellor until he resigned in favor of Bülow in October 1900, but Hohenlohe-Schillingsfürst was in his own words a "straw doll" and a "façade" starting in 1897. Bülow was the man who effectively ran the government from 1897 onwards and his assuming the chancellorship in 1900 was a mere formality.

After Eulenburg started to work as an unofficial political advisor to Wilhelm in 1888, he displayed a marked fear of publicity and tried to remain within the shadows as much as possible; Eulenburg, who regarded Bülow as his alter-ego, preferred that Bülow take the spotlight.

== Byzantinism ==
Eulenburg fronted the Liebenberg Circle. This was a group of aristocrats with an expensive taste for art. Most of the Liebenberg Circle had worked as diplomats and their opinions were heard by the Kaiser. Eulenburg's influence was the obstruction of preventative war and any kind of adventure on foreign soil. Eulenburg was in turn criticized by his contemporaries as effeminate. He was accused of being a pacifist. Maximilian Harden published accusations of homosexuality. This scandal would destroy Eulenburg's career in the civil service because the episode supported the preconception of aristocratic decadence among politicians that were socialist middle class.

== "Aesthetic anti-semitism": art, race and politics in Eulenburg's worldview ==
During his time as ambassador to Austria, Eulenburg who was a Wagnerite befriended one of the world's leading Wagnerites, Houston Stewart Chamberlain who was living in Vienna at the time. Besides their shared love of Richard Wagner, Eulenburg, who was an anti-Semite, Anglophobe and an opponent of democracy, found much to admire in Chamberlain's anti-Semitic, Anglophobic and anti-democratic writings. Eulenburg was a völkisch anti-Semite who believed Jews to be an alien race from Asia who were "poisoning" the European Aryan race in all sorts of ways.

In 1895 Wilhelm commissioned a painting from Hermann Knackfuss, depicting a nightmare he had with a Buddha wreathed in fire being carried by an Asian-style dragon threatening Europe. The painting became known as the "Yellow Peril", the name given to the perceived Asian threat to Europe. Eulenburg, who shared Wilhelm's hatred of Asians, was enthralled with the painting; on 29 September 1895 he wrote to the Empress "I am quite under the spell of this truly magnificent work. The idea is uplifting and the execution masterly. When I immerse myself in the contemplation of the picture I am filled with the feeling that all Europe must indeed answer the call of the beloved Kaiser to unite in peaceful harmony for the sake of the cross and the dearest goods, but then the uneasy feeling steals over me that the evil in those men who oppose as an enemy power the good which manifests itself in the Kaiser's being will now cause them to tear down and attack with their ingenious criticism that which has sprung from the high-mindedness and noble heart of the Kaiser". To his mother Eulenburg wrote about the Yellow Peril painting: "The Kaiser has given me a magnificent engraving of the wonderful allegorical picture executed by Prof. Knackfuss from His Imperial Majesty's sketch: the peoples of Europe, represented as female figures, are called upon by St. Michael to defend the cross against unbelief, heathenism, etc. You will like it...It is a beautiful idea in a beautiful form". Eulenburg's "unforgettable friend" Gobineau had been obsessed with the fear of the "Yellow Peril", which he had expressed in his epic 1881 poem Amadis where European civilization is destroyed by a Chinese invasion.

Much of Wilhelm's anti-Asian racism and warnings of the "Yellow Peril" very closely resembles Gobineau's writings on the Chinese, which is not surprising given that Eulenburg had introduced the Kaiser to Gobineau's theories. The American historian Gregory Blue wrote about the "Eulenburg connection", whereby Eulenburg played a key role in introducing the Kaiser to Gobineau's anti-Asian writings. Furthermore, Blue noted that the sketch that Wilhelm had drawn of his nightmare in April 1895 looks very different than The Yellow Peril painting that Knackfuss finished in September 1895, being considerably more disturbing and nightmarish than the finished product and, as much of the imagery in the painting appears to be drawn from Amadis, he argued that the "Eulenburg connection" was at work here, with Eulenburg playing a major, if uncredited, role in generating The Yellow Peril painting.

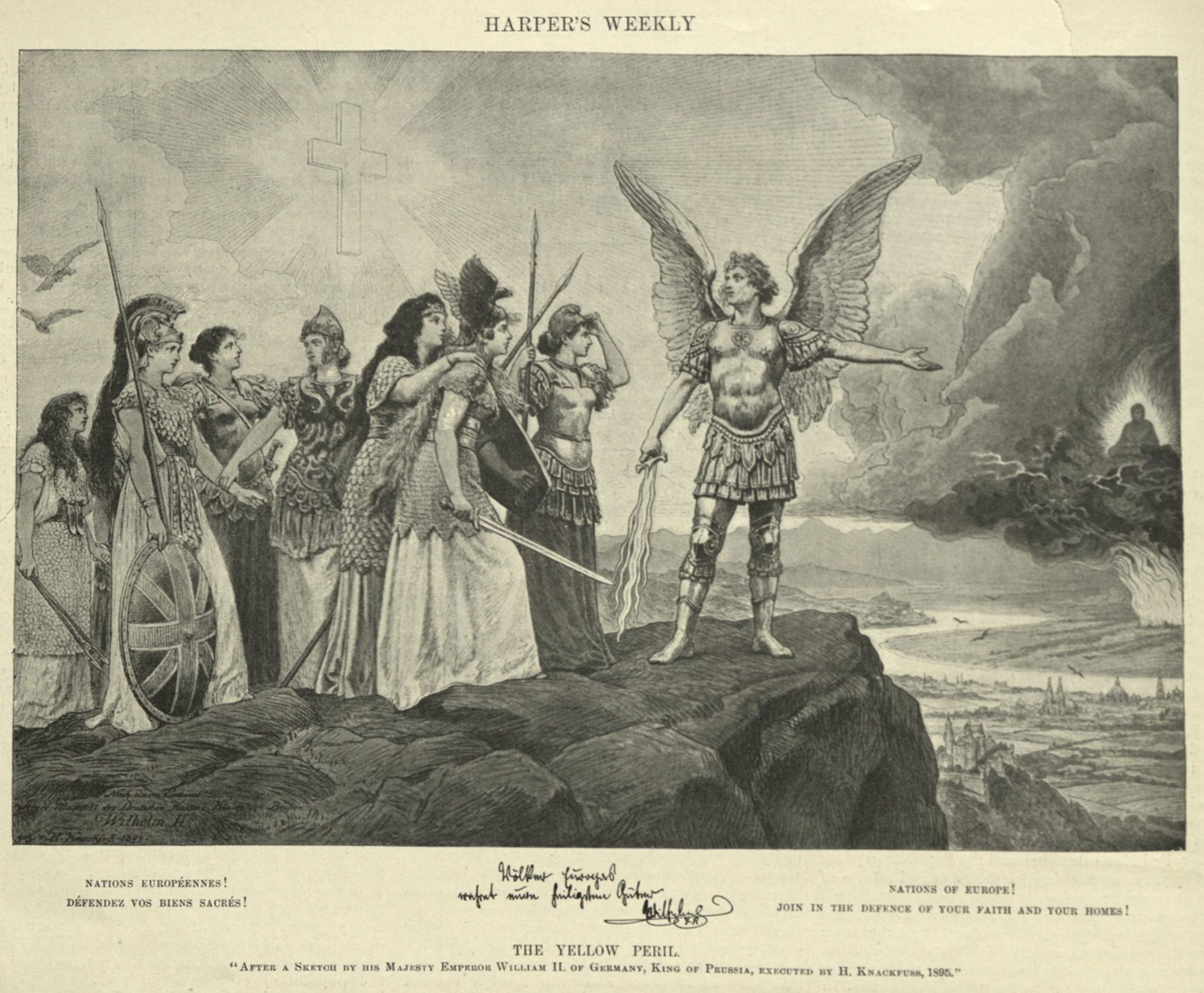
Völker Europas, wahrt eure heiligsten Güter ("Peoples of Europe, guard your dearest goods," 1895) The "Yellow Peril" painting that so impressed Eulenburg in 1895

Wilhelm II always saw himself as a great artist with an intense interest in painting (especially warships) and sculpture. Wilhelm was so interested in the arts and culture that on 18 December 1901 he gave the so-called "gutter art" speech in which he denounced French Impressionist painting, modernist architecture, German Expressionism and the Jugendstil as all "gutter art" dragging the world down, and called for Germany to assume cultural leadership of the world by producing the sort of art that he approved of to save humanity from the degrading cultural effects of "gutter art". Eulenburg's status as a cultured, artistic man meant he served as both a political and cultural adviser to the Kaiser. For Wilhelm, politics and culture were one and the same. For him, the popularity of Impressionist paintings was a sign of the "degeneracy" of the French while his paintings of warships were a sign of the spiritual strength of the Germans. Like many other völkisch nationalists, Eulenburg believed in the unity of race, language, religion, culture, ethnicity, and nationality. Thus for Eulenburg, art and politics were one and the same, both being expressions of one's "race". Domeier described Eulenburg as the chief promoter of "aesthetic anti-Semitism", a type of anti-Semitism concerned with glorying on one hand a romantic, reactionary and racist understanding of German national identity that expressly rejected the values of the Age of Enlightenment while on the other hand depicting Jews as a "racial other", the antithesis of the "Aryan race", a people who formed another "race" that simply did not belong in Germany and were the principal cause of Germany's problems.

Eulenburg's cultural works such as his songs and poems, in which he often expressed his "aesthetic anti-Semitism," were just another means of promoting his values, as was political work. For example, Eulenburg's popular poem Sang an Aegir (Song to Aegir), while being a love poem, also contains many racist and Pan-German themes. Domeier argued that Eulenburg's cultural activities cannot be treated separately from his political activities, as both were concerned with "aesthetic anti-Semitism".

At the same time, he did his utmost to further anti-Semitism in classic political areas including diplomacy, foreign policy and culture. Aesthetic anti-Semitism can be understood as one of the many forms of aesthetic fundamentalism in the modern era as well as a cultural code used by hereditary and intellectual aristocrats at the end of the long nineteen century. As it spread throughout society by virtue of these groups' social prestige, it took on attributes of a paradigm. Aesthetic anti-Semitism found its way into the aristocracy and conservative bourgeoisie not through aggressive agitators such as Ahlwardt, Dühring, Fritsch or Stöcker, but rather in poetic shadings and nuances."

When the Bavarian government proved unwilling to subsidize the Bayreuth Festival performing Wagner's operas, Cosima Wagner turned to Eulenburg for help. Eulenburg let it be known that Wilhelm—who was also the King of Prussia—was willing to subsidize the Bayreuth festival; rather than see the Prussian king intervene in Bavarian affairs, the Bavarian government agreed to subsidize Bayreuth. Eulenburg saw the Bayreuth festival as the "cultural founding" of the empire that had failed to take place in 1871, and Eulenburg believed that in time the Bayreuth festival would become the "cultural center" of the "Germanic race". The Wagnerite Eulenburg saw the Bayreuth festival as a way of promoting not only Wagner's music, but also his anti-Semitic politics to the German public.

A vivid display of Eulenburg's anti-Semitism occurred in October 1895 when he reluctantly attended a Jewish charity concert in Vienna. In a dispatch back to the Kaiser, Eulenburg complained that he was the "sole Aryan" in the entire concert hall and stated his ears were pained to hear of "the indescribable mishmash of German spoken with Austrian, Bohemian and Hungarian accents with international cliquishness". Eulenburg went on to write of his disgust of the "drooping and enormously crooked noses", "bandy knees", "noses like tapirs", "fat lips", "prominent cheekbones", "eye teeth like a walrus's", "slanted eyes like slits", "gaping jaws with hollow teeth", and the "exposed and sweaty shoulders" of the Jewish women in their evening night-gowns. Eulenburg wrote that the Jews all paying their respects to a "Jewish greybeard" proved the old Jew "must have slaughtered and eaten many Christian children, since two dozen long yellow teeth protruded from his ghastly maw" (it is not clear in repeating the blood libel if Eulenburg was making an anti-Semitic joke or if he really believed in the blood libel). Finally, Eulenburg concluded his report to the Kaiser that the "badly behaved" Jewish children at the concert were all repulsively ugly, and that the only attractive Jew he saw at the concert was the lead singer, a young woman whom Eulenburg stated was more animal than human, albeit one who could sing very well for a Jew.

Despite his anti-Semitism, during his time as Ambassador to Austria Eulenburg engaged in a homosexual relationship with the Austrian banker Nathaniel Meyer von Rothschild, who liked Eulenburg so much that when he died in 1905 he left Eulenburg one million krones. Rothschild, who possessed great wealth, was ostracized by the Austrian aristocracy because he was a Jew (also being gay contributed to his feeling like an outsider), and he often paid aristocrats to be his friends, which is how he met Eulenburg. Eulenburg often proclaimed his hatred of Jews, but he was prepared to socialize with wealthy Jews provided that they were willing to pay well for the social prestige that they accrued by having such an illustrious man as Eulenburg in their social circle. The relative penury of his youth left Eulenburg with an insatiable desire for money, and despite his wealth, he was always on the lookout for chances to make more money.

In 1897 Eulenburg's younger brother Friedrich von Eulenburg, an army officer, was charged with being a homosexual. His older brother tried his best to have the Kaiser stop the court-martial, but the Army was unwilling to do so. In 1900, Eulenburg wrote a long memo for the benefit of his social circle about the court-martial of his brother, writing that men like himself and his brother were always threatened with public disgrace, which ended:

"Farewell, my friend! Are you certain that you have understood the story correctly? Please read it once again I beg you! So that you understand completely that the path of our lives is crossed by terrible demons, and that we should raise our hands to God in supplication, begging him, begging him fervently to defend us from them, to defend our loved ones from them!".

In 1898, scandal threatened Eulenburg when the wife of Kuno von Moltke in a sealed deposition filed for divorce on the grounds that her husband was more interested in having sex with Eulenburg than with her. Moltke promptly instructed his lawyer to settle the divorce in his wife's favor in exchange for her not making these accusations public. Axel "Dachs" von Varnbüler wrote to Moltke telling him not to worry about losing the favor of "the One" [Wilhelm II] saying:

"I'm sure I am not mistaken in thinking that your pain is sharpened because you cannot hide, keep at bay, all this ugliness from him, from the Liebchen ["Darling"-Wilhelm II]. But do not torment yourself unnecessarily about this -- he is man enough to put a stop to nasty gossip -- and he knows and loves you too well in your peculiarity to allow even the shadow of blame to fall upon you".

After learning of Moltke's divorce, Wilhelm confronted Varnbüler, and demanded to know what was happening. According to Varnbüler in a letter written on 4 June 1898 to Moltke: "The Liebchen accosted me in the Tiergarten the day before yesterday. After he duly admired my yellow boots and colour co-ordinated riding costume, he asked me "Don't you know anything about Kuno? I can't get anything out of either him or Philly"". Varnbüler went on to write that Wilhelm used "unrepeatably energetic expressions" which indicated to Varnbüler "that he was extremely well-informed and no longer retained any illusions"."

After 1897, with Bülow in effective charge of the government, Eulenburg's role as a political trouble-shooter largely came to an end, with Eulenburg himself writing that the "great turning point" was the summer of 1897 because with the "personal rule" of Wilhelm in place, the Kaiser was now firmly in charge after struggling to assert his authority since coming to the throne in 1888. Eulenburg himself happily wrote: "No more bomb-like despatches, no more wild letters from Holstein, no more lamentations from Marschall!!!". Eulenburg had a broader vision beyond helping Wilhelm establish his "personal regime". Eulenburg was a convinced opponent of democracy and was threatened by growing demand for democracy in Germany. Germany in the 1890s was nowhere close to a revolution, but Eulenburg could see that in the long run the demand for democracy would continue to grow. Eulenburg was opposed to proclaiming martial law and ruling via terror as he argued that a regime based only on fear could not command popular legitimacy or respect, and would not last in the long run. Instead Eulenburg argued for Wilhelm's personal regime" to be based upon the Roman formula of "bread and circus". The "bread" in this case would be a greatly expanded welfare state, while the "circus" would be Weltpolitik ("World politics"). Thus, the growth of the welfare state from 1897 onwards and the introduction of navalist politics represented by the Tirpitz Plan intended to win Germany "world power status" were closely connected as part of the effort to stabilise the regime. For Eulenburg, Weltpolitik together with the related politics of navalism were initially more of a means for stabilizing the political system by gathering popular support for the regime than a goal in and of themselves. In this respect, the German historian Michael Epkenhans wrote that it was no accident that in 1897 Admiral Alfred von Tirpitz was appointed naval state secretary. The charismatic Tirpitz was a born showman who quickly managed to convert much of the German public over to navalism, arguing for the formula that sea power equals world power—whoever rules the seas also rules the world. Even through Tirpitz saw his efforts as primarily directed towards making Germany the world's greater power, there was an element of domestic stabilization involved in his campaign for greater spending on the navy.

On 7 October 1898, Eulenburg summoned the leader of Zionism, the Hungarian journalist Theodor Herzl to Liebenberg to announce that his master Wilhelm II wanted to see a Jewish state established in Palestine (which would be a German protectorate) in order to "drain" the Jews away from Europe, and thus "purify the German race". Herzl recalled that Eulenburg was a "perfect gentleman" during his visit to Liebenberg, but he made no attempt to hide his anti-Semitism, saying to Herzl's face that he believed that the Jews did not belong in Europe and that he only supported Zionism as the best way of removing the Jews humanely from Europe. Eulenburg told Herzl that he had a special relationship with the Kaiser that allowed him to "speak freely" to Wilhelm in a way no-one else could. The plan for establishing a Jewish state in Palestine came to nought when the Ottoman Sultan Abdul Hamid II rejected the plan, saying that Palestine was Muslim land that he would never cede to the Jews and, more importantly, he had no intention of giving up any part of his empire.

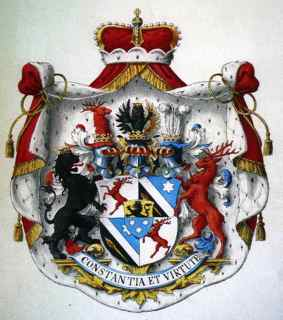
Coat of arms of Philipp, Prince zu Eulenburg und Hertefeld, Count von Sandels, 1900

In 1900, Eulenburg was created the first hereditary Prince (Fürst) zu Eulenburg und Hertefeld and Count von Sandels. The princely title was entailed to the family's perpetual possession of the Hertefeld estate. The second title was in honour of the family of his wife, whose father was the last Swedish Count of Sandels. Simultaneously, Eulenburg was accorded the honorific of Serene Highness, the same style used by the German Empire's still-reigning princes, such as the rulers of Lippe, Reuss and Waldeck and Pyrmont.

In 1900, the Boxer Rebellion broke out in China. The German minister to China, Baron Clemens von Ketteler, had murdered in public view a 14-year-old Chinese boy, who had nothing to do with Boxers, as a reaction to the Boxer threat. This abuse of diplomatic immunity made Ketteler very unpopular in China, and led to him being murdered by the Chinese soldiers who were supposed to be protecting him as he travelled to the Forbidden City. Wilhelm—the man who popularized the phrase "the Yellow Peril" and who had always hated Asians with a passion—was enraged by the news that his minister in China had been murdered, and he was determined to wreck bloody vengeance on the Chinese. Eulenburg was with Wilhelm aboard the Hohenzollern on the annual North Sea summer cruise in 1900, and saw at first hand Wilhelm's viscerally hate-filled rage against the Chinese. Eulenburg wrote that Wilhelm regarded Kettler's murder as a "personal insult" and he was going to "send troops to take revenge!!!". At the height of the Boxer crisis, Eulenburg wrote to Bülow that he was utterly terrified of Wilhelm—whom Eulenburg said was not entirely sane—and that Bülow should be careful when reporting the news from China out of fear of what Wilhelm might do. Eulenburg wrote to Bülow:

"His Majesty is no longer in control of himself when He is seized by rage. I regard the situation as highly dangerous and I am at a loss as to know what to do...These things cut me to the quick. I have had so much faith in the Kaiser's abilities—and in the passage of time!—Now both have failed, and one sees a person suffering whom one loves dearly but cannot help...I have the impression that I am sitting on a powder keg and I am extremely careful. Please limit your political reports as much as possible and request decisions only where they are unavoidable."

Eulenburg added that he had sent a doctor to try to calm Wilhelm down, as he was trapped in a seemingly permanent state of rage—spending every waking moment violently ranting and raving nonstop about his hatred of the Chinese and the bloody revenge he was planning to take on them—but to no avail. Wilhelm II was not the only member of the House of Hohenzollern to have a meltdown in 1900. In October 1900, there were what Eulenburg called "appalling scenes" as the Empress behaved "like a madwoman" as she started to scream and cry uncontrollably, complaining that the Emperor did not love her, did not help with raising their children and spent all of his time with Eulenburg. The Kaiserin also accused her husband of having an affair with Eulenburg.

In 1901, Eulenburg introduced Houston Stewart Chamberlain to Wilhelm II, who first met at Eulenburg's Liebenberg estate. The next day Eulenburg wrote that the Emperor "stood completely under the spell of this man [Chamberlain], whom he understood better than any of the other guests because of his thorough study of The Foundations".

== Scandal ==
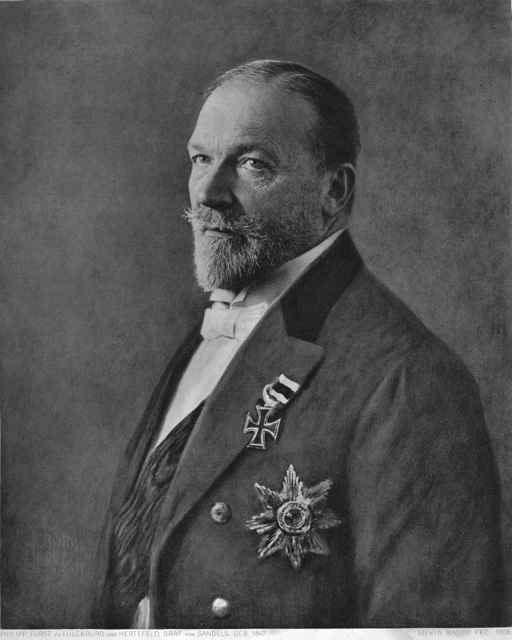
Philipp, Prince of Eulenburg (1906)

Although he was married, Eulenburg was connected in homosexual liaisons with members of the Kaiser's inner circle, including Count Kuno von Moltke, the military commander of Berlin. Sources say that he continued to have homosexual relationships even while he was married and fathered numerous children. The public exposure of these liaisons in 1906 led to the Harden-Eulenburg Affair that attracted worldwide attention.

With the appointment of Eulenburg's protégé, Count (and later Prince) Bernhard von Bülow, as Chancellor of Germany in October 1900, Eulenburg's influence reached its peak. Although Bülow remained in office until July 1909, Eulenburg's influence declined again after the turn of the century. In 1902, he relinquished his ambassadorship in Vienna and withdrew entirely to his Liebenberg estate. Although Wilhelm II visited him occasionally, it was clear to insiders that Eulenburg's heyday was behind him. The historian Volker Ullrich writes: "In the eyes of the critical public, however, Eulenburg was still considered the head of a secondary government, a »camarilla«, which exerted a corrupting influence on the Kaiser and the Reich's politics ... In the autumn of 1906, when the Bismarck admirer Maximilian Harden began his campaign against Eulenburg and his circle of friends, the discontent over the conditions at the top of the Reich's leadership had reached a climax.

The scandal was caused by the growing power of the Bülow-Eulenburg clique within the Auswärtiges Amt around the turn of the century, at the expense of the Holstein faction. Holstein was known as the "Monster of the Labyrinth", a master of the dark arts of political intrigue with an impressive private intelligence network who had made himself indispensable to successive governments over the years. To get his way, Holstein had often threatened to resign, believing that no government could do without his services, a threat that had always worked in the past. After the debacle of Algeciras Conference (which ended April 1906), Holstein had quarreled with Bülow and submitted his resignation to Wilhelm; much to his intense shock, it was accepted. After learning from one of his spies that Eulenburg had over the course of a lunch with the Kaiser told him to accept Holstein's resignation, an extremely embittered Holstein decided to seek revenge on Eulenburg.

In May 1906, Holstein sent Eulenburg a libelous and very rude letter insulting him, and challenging him to a duel to the death. Eulenburg wrote to Varnbüler soon after saying that: "I had a long, very heated discussion with H.M about Hol[stein] and disagreeable it was for me. He will not forgive me, if he should later hear anything concerning my affairs, that I have said not a word to him about what has taken place". After Eulenburg declined to fight the duel, Holstein decided to destroy Eulenburg by attacking him in his Achilles heel, namely by exposing his homosexuality. To that end, Holstein contacted the crusading journalist Maximilian Harden to inform him that Eulenburg was gay. Holstein had known Eulenburg since June 1886, and had on some point along the line learned of Eulenburg's sexual orientation. After being tipped off by Holstein, Harden started to run a series of articles in his newspaper Die Zukunft charging the "Liebenberg Round Table", a clique of homosexuals obsessed with the occult headed by Eulenburg, were dominating the Imperial court. Röhl wrote that Harden used terribly homophobic language in his attacks on Eulenburg, but the essence of his articles alleging the existence of a "Liebenberg Round Table" at the court was indeed correct. Since 1886, the newly married Wilhelm regularly stayed at Eulenburg's Liebenberg Estate in Brandenburg, officially for hunting, but in reality primarily because of the emotional environment offered by the count which provided him with relaxation and distraction, especially after his accession to the throne. The all-male group was characterized by a fundamental homoeroticism. “Phili” Eulenburg, the passionate singer, was called “the troubadour” by his friends, and the Crown Prince and later Emperor was called “the sweetheart” by the group.

In the aftermath of the First Moroccan Crisis which ended with the Reich humiliated at the Algeciras Conference, Harden's accusations that German foreign policy was being run by a clique of homosexuals who were too "soft" to make the necessary decisions to go to war had a wide resonance. The belligerent ultra-nationalist Harden believed that Germany should have attacked France in 1905, even if it meant war with Britain and possibly the United States as well; in his mind, the only reason why Wilhelm chose to attend the Algeciras conference rather than go to war was because he was being advised by the Liebenberg Round Table.

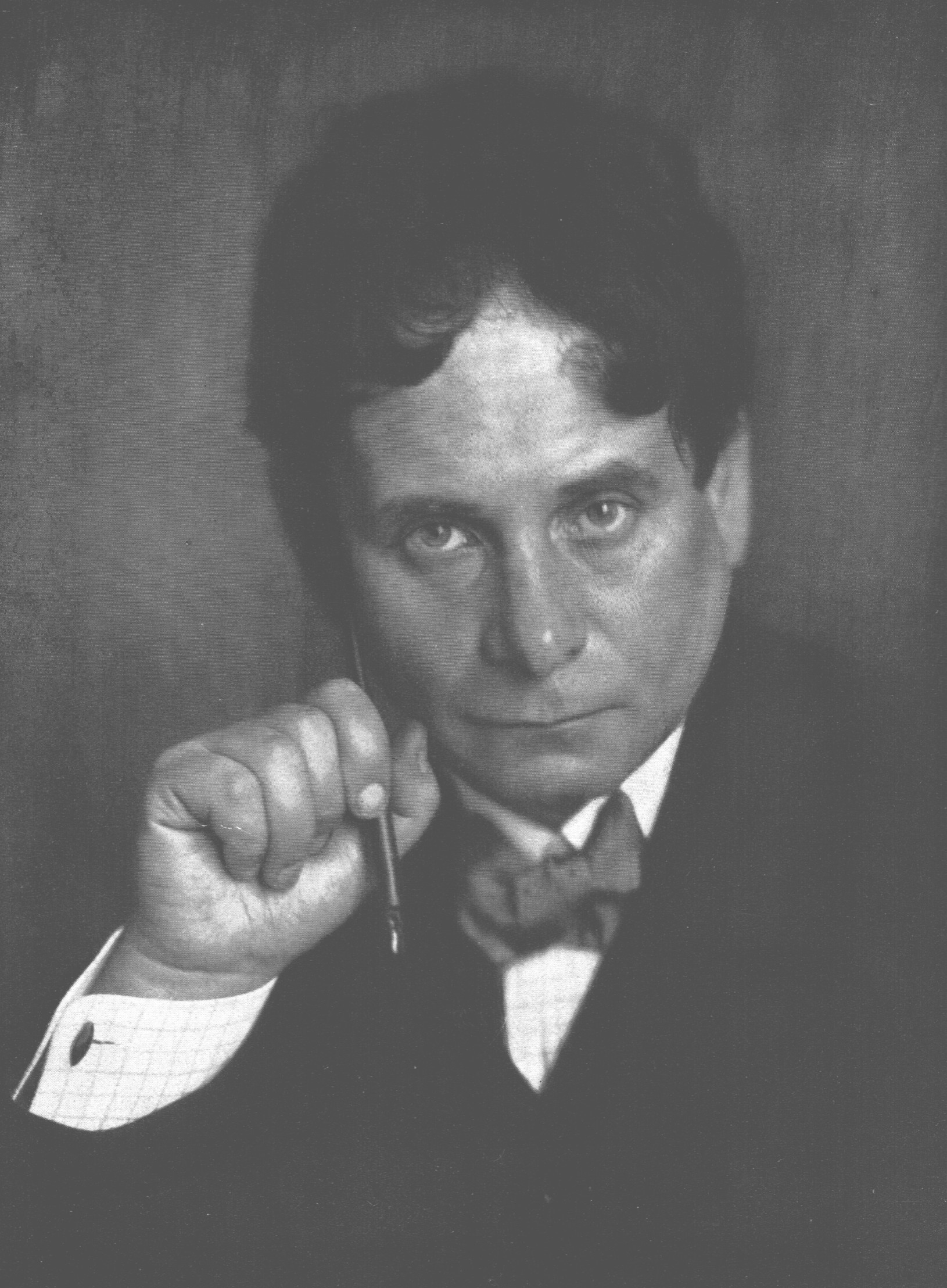
Maximilian Harden

In November 1906, Harden ran an article about an unnamed senior German diplomat being gay who was clearly meant to be Eulenburg whom Harden called "the Harpist", and accused him of having a relationship with an unnamed senior French diplomat, stating the two frequently went on hunting trips together. Raymond Lecomte, the First Secretary at the French embassy in Berlin—who was a close associate of Eulenburg, whom he frequently went hunting with—promptly burned all of his papers relating to Eulenburg after Harden's article. Harden made much of the Eulenburg-Lecomte relationship to suggest that Eulenburg was being blackmailed into working as a French spy; Eulenburg and Lecomte were lovers, but there is no evidence to suggest that Eulenburg ever provided intelligence to France. Beyond that, Harden made much of Eulenburg's effeminate ways and love of singing to suggest that Eulenburg was simply not manly enough to properly direct the affairs of the Reich; Harden's hero was Bismarck, whom Harden admiringly presented as an ideal Prussian man: tough, militaristic, ruthless, hard, decisive, and certainly not someone who liked to sing as Eulenburg did. In his articles Harden claimed that to direct the affairs of state required "hard men" like Bismarck who could make the necessary decisions such as taking the nation to war (Harden saw war-making as the principal purpose of the state), and Harden charged that women were simply too soft to be leaders, that women would rather submit to force than fight. Harden thus argued that someone effeminate like Eulenburg was too "womanly" to be guiding the German state, and suggested that Germany's diplomatic defeat in the First Moroccan Crisis of 1905–06 was due to Eulenburg's influence on the Kaiser. Harden's initial target was not Wilhelm, but Eulenburg; Harden believed that the Kaiser would have gone to war with France in 1905 on his own, and it was Eulenburg who had supposedly held him back. Despite his homophobic attacks on the Liebenberg Round Table as a degenerate gay clique mismanaging foreign policy, Harden had surprisingly liberal views on homosexuality and often called for the repeal of Paragraph 175.

In 1907 Moltke sued Harden for libel after the latter ran an article accusing him and Eulenburg of having a sexual relationship and lost. At the trial, the sexologist and early gay rights advocate Magnus Hirschfeld testified for Harden, stating that Moltke was gay. The homosexual Hirschfeld—who passionately wanted to make homosexuality legal in Germany—believed that proving that Army officers like Moltke were gay would help his case for legalization, and as such he also testified that he believed there was nothing wrong with Moltke. Hirschfeld's testimony caused outrage all over Germany; the Die Vossische Zeitung newspaper condemned Hirschfeld in an editorial as "a freak who acted for freaks in the name of pseudoscience" while the Die Mūnchener Neuesten Nachrichten declared in an editorial: "Dr. Hirschfeld makes public propaganda under the cover of science which does nothing but poison our people. Real science should fight against this!". After the jury ruled in favor of Harden, Judge Hugo Isenbiel was enraged by the jury's decision, which he saw as expressing approval for Hirschfeld, and overturned the verdict under the grounds that homosexuals "have the morals of dogs". After that verdict was overturned, a second trial found Harden guilty of libel. Harden appealed and was again found guilty and agreed to an out-of-court settlement. At the same time the much publicized Moltke-Harden-Eulenburg case played out to banner headlines all around the world, the gay rights campaigner Adolf Brand—who believed that the public would accept homosexuality as normal if only enough high-profile gays were outed—published a pamphlet alleging that Chancellor Bülow was gay. Bülow then sued Brand for libel, and during the course of this trial, Eulenburg testified as a character witness, during which he denied under oath that he had ever committed any "depravities" with Bülow or any other men. Eulenburg also testified that he was appalled by the attempts of Brand and Hirschfeld to legalize homosexuality, saying that he believed that homosexuality was a disgusting evil that should be stamped out without any mercy. The anti-Semitic Eulenburg saw himself as the victim of a Jewish plot to ruin him for his role in promoting his type of "aesthetic anti-Semitism", and called Harden a "rascally Jew".

In late 1907 during the course of the second Moltke-Harden libel trial, Eulenburg had been subpoenaed by Harden's lawyers and testified that he never engaged in homosexual acts with Moltke or any other men. Harden, who had realized to his cost that it was hard to win a case in Prussia, came up with a new strategy. Harden had a friend in Munich, Anton Städele, run a false article in his newspaper Neue Frie Volkszeitung saying that Eulenburg had bribed Harden; Harden then sued Städele for libel. During this trial, on 22 April 1908, two Bavarian lake fishermen named Jakob Ernst and Georg Riedel testified under oath in a Munich courtroom that they had both been sodomized by Eulenburg when he had vacationed on the Starnbergersee in the 1880s, which led to Eulenburg being indicted for perjury. Harden won his libel case against Städele, and then secretly paid him back the sum he had just won against him in court. On 30 April 1908, Eulenburg was interviewed by three detectives from the Berlin police department during a visit to Liebenberg about the revelations from the Munich trial; in their report one of the detectives wrote that Eulenburg was the greatest liar he had ever met during his career as a policeman and should definitely be indicted for perjury.

In 1908, Eulenburg was placed on trial for perjury due to his denial of his homosexuality; the trial was repeatedly postponed due to Eulenburg's claim of poor health. After Eulenburg was arrested on 8 May 1908 at his Liebenberg estate, the Prussian police seized and burned all of his papers while on 27 May 1908, the Bavarian police raided the estate of Baron Jan von Wendelstadt—who was yet another of Eulenburg's gay friends—to seize and burn all of his papers relating to Eulenburg. Eulenburg, who had been expecting this move from the authorities for some time, had copied certain of his letters and had them hidden all over Germany; the last known of these caches of letters were discovered in 1971 hidden in the wine cellar of the Hemmingen castle. None of the surviving Eulenburg letters indicate that Wilhelm II was gay, but they do mention that Jakob Ernst, the fisherman on the Starnbergersee—with whom Eulenburg had a relationship in the late 1880s—was a friend of Wilhelm II at the same time, being employed to row the Kaiser and Eulenburg around the Starnbergersee when the two vacationed there in the 1880s. Since the Kaiser did not normally associate with Bavarian lake fishermen, people in 1908 would have suspected something very unusual in this friendship, and given the relationship between Ernst and Eulenburg, many people would have concluded that Wilhelm was also having sex with Ernst, though the surviving Eulenburg letters give no such indication. After Eulenburg's arrest, Wilhelm wrote him a very cold letter saying he wanted no homosexuals at his court, as such their friendship was now over and he never wanted to see or hear from Eulenburg again. Eulenburg was utterly heart-broken that Wilhelm had turned against him. Varnbüler wrote, but did not send Eulenburg a letter suggesting that he commit suicide to save the honour of the Kaiser. Varnbüler later wrote in 1912 that he changed his mind on whether Eulenburg should take his life after considering how Wilhelm had abandoned Eulenburg, when "all members of the court and military circles avoided Eulenburg as though he were a criminal and a leper", when even Bülow "failed the test of friendship", when Moltke refused to answer Eulenburg's letters and members of the Eulenburg family "shamefully distanced themselves from Liebenberg", that he could not turn against his friend Eulenburg and decided to stand by him.

During his time in jail (Eulenburg had been denied bail) while he was taken back and forth to his trial, a deeply depressed Eulenburg so often spoke of taking his own life that he was put under suicide watch. During the trial, the major prosecution witness was Ernst as Riedel had a "typically Bavarian" criminal record for drunken brawling as he had been convicted of assault 32 times, all under the influence of alcohol, and thus was not seen as the most credible of witnesses. Eulenburg testified that Ernst's daily beer consumption was "excessive, even by Bavarian standards" and claimed that his accounts of sexual encounters between himself and him were unreliable, coming from someone who spent so much of his time in a drunken daze. Eulenburg explained the trial as part of a Catholic plot to destroy him, as he was a leading defender of the "Protestant empire" and so he claimed that the Jesuits wanted to discredit him in order to enable Bavaria to break away, a remark that sparked enormous controversy as it suggested that Germany was and should be a Protestant-dominated state. During the trial, it was revealed that Eulenburg had engaged in witness tampering for he had sent his servant Georg Kistler with a letter he had written to meet Riedel telling him not to mention what they had done together in the 1880s and that he was safe from prosecution for the statute of limitations for violating Paragraph 175 had expired. Eulenburg's trial was for perjury, but effectively it was for homosexuality as the prosecution presented a long list of witnesses, mostly working-class young men who testified that Eulenburg had tried to engage them in sex, or had made inappropriate remarks. Eulenburg did not help his cause when he testified that he had never broken Paragraph 175 in the narrow, technical sense that Paragraph 175 had specifically prohibited only anal sex, thereby implying that he engaged in sexual acts other than sodomy with Moltke and other men. Finally, it was revealed that despite Eulenburg's claim that he was stoutly opposed to the efforts of Brand and Hirschfeld to legalize homosexuality, the police search of Liebenberg after his arrest had uncovered numerous pamphlets produced by the gay rights group the Scientific-Humanitarian Committee calling for the legalization of homosexuality. On 13 July 1908, Eulenburg collapsed in court, and the judge ruled that the trial was over as Eulenburg was medically unfit. Right up until his death in 1921, Eulenburg was examined by doctors twice every year to see if he was fit to stand trial and was always found to be unfit.

Harden wrote to Holstein on 15 November 1908 stating that he believed that the "united fairies" at the court as he called Eulenburg and his friends had such power because they could blackmail the Emperor, who he strongly suggested was also one of the "fairies" at the court. By this time, Harden had become convinced that the problem was not Eulenburg, but rather Wilhelm. Harden went on to write: "To clear ourselves of shame and ridicule, we will have to go to war soon, or face the sad necessity of making a change of imperial personnel on our own account, even if the strongest personal pressure had to be brought to bear. (Or I could say: even if we had do things in 'Earnest')."

== After the fall ==
Before and during World War I, Prince Eulenburg was strongly in favour of German expansionism. As he aged, Eulenburg had come to embrace the goal of Weltpolitik as a goal in and of itself while at the same time as the Anglo-German naval race continued to express concern about how the Tirpitz Plan was destroying the German budget as the state continued to pour and pour more money into building warships. In an essay he wrote in April 1912 entitled "The German Fleet", Eulenburg wrote that he believed "that the Kaiser nor the German government want the war" (emphasis in the original), which he held to be inevitable. But he wrote that Germany was the principal cause of international tensions, writing that:

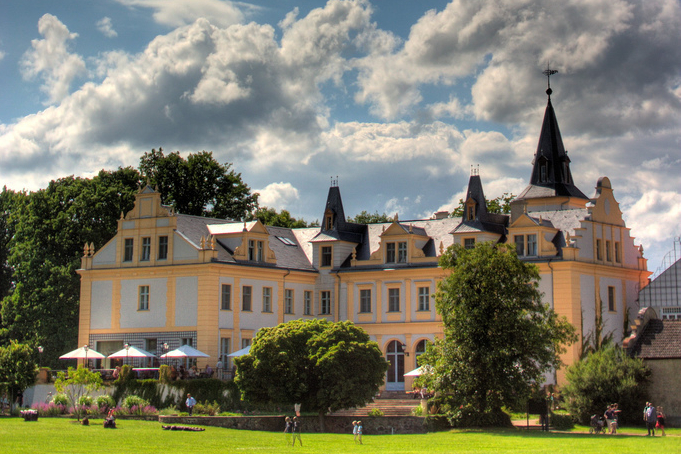
Schloss Liebenberg, Eulenburg's country estate, where he retired

Our Battle Fleet – not the British one – has sparked off the naval arms race among the Great Powers, with the result that even Austria is now engaging in the dreadnought gamble. For it is a gamble if even the dreadnoughts which cost millions are rendered obsolescent in the shortest space of time by the invention of new types of ships, and if financially ordered States are ruined and finally driven into wars of desperation by the continued building of such giant ships... That the fact of our building this threatening Battle Fleet will possibly or even probably lead to a decision to pursue a policy of violence. If at the same time the Government preaches peace, then the dictates of logic force me to accuse this Government of the "nation of philosophers" either of stupidity or of deliberate deception.

Eulenburg concluded that the naval build-up advocated by Grand Admiral Alfred von Tirpitz known as the Tirpitz Plan was wasteful in the extreme, arguing that Germany would have been better served by a small cruiser fleet capable of protecting the German merchant marine and coastlines, and allowing the billions of marks spent on the Navy to go to social reforms and the Army instead. Eulenburg argued that the great expansion of the German Navy was unnecessary as Germany was "neither an island nor a boat, but a beautiful green field on the Continent in which the sheep, guarded by the military sheepdogs, get fat while the oxen engage in politics." ("Schaf" (sheep) and "Ochse" (ox) can be used to describe a lack of intelligence in German.)

But at the same time, Eulenburg's rejection of navalism was based on the idea that it was the wrong way to pursue German ambitions. Eulenburg wrote:

Is the purpose behind the building of a Battle Fleet the establishment of German predominance over the entire face of the earth? The destruction of British domination? If so, then the building of a Battle Fleet would indeed be necessary – but even only if there were no other means of attaining this goal.

Eulenburg wrote that the best way of pursuing German power politics was "The unification of the Powers of the European Continent". Eulenburg stated that the "great Napoleon" thought the unification of all Europe under French leadership was the only way of "breaking England's domination of the sea". Eulenburg wrote that Napoleon had failed because Russia was unwilling and because "military communications were totally inadequate at the time." By contrast, Eulenburg wrote:

Today, on the other hand, we can assume that Europe's land armies would be just as well placed as her navies to destroy England's world position. Indeed, it might actually be more effective to defeat the English colonial army than to attack the English fleet. Using existing railroad lines stretching from Madrid to Siberia and Persia, the nearly completed Baghdad railroad and the Cape-Cairo Railway, the English could be so seriously threatened in Asia and Africa as to make them think twice before they exploit their naval advantage in far-away places against members of the continental European coalition... Our standing German Army would become almost fantastically strong if even one quarter of the billions spent on the Navy were used to expand it, so that it would act as a tremendous magnet to the Powers of the coalition and attract and bind them to the strongest Power despite their unwillingness to lose their independence. The countries of Europe would bow to the peaceful leadership of such a mighty Germany in the same way as the federal German states bow to the leadership of a mighty Prussia."

Eulenburg argued that the money saved by cutting back on the Navy would allow every German town to have an Army garrison "which would act as an ever-alert military police force against the excesses of Social Democracy". Eulenburg ended his essay by arguing that his proposals were not meant to prevent a war, but to ensure that Germany would win a war against Britain, which Eulenburg claimed was inevitable. Eulenburg ended by writing:

And why not war? We Prussians are accustomed to it. Our recent history, which is still fresh in everyone's mind, demonstrates the advancement of the State through war and the use of force. We have not fared too badly by using these methods.

Only we never pursued this course honestly.

Honestly like Napoleon who never denied that he was striving for world domination! Honestly like the English who took whatever they wanted without asking. Honestly like the Russians, who added one Asiatic state after another to the Tsar's empire without trumpeting promises of peace throughout the world before.

For opportunistic reasons we have falsified history, we have written the words "German loyalty", "German truth", "the German temperament" on every street corner and have hidden our carefully laid plans for war behind them.

In this sense, however, we have always remained true to ourselves, following in the footsteps of Frederick the Great who, through his troops were already on the march to Silesia, wrote to the Empress Maria Theresa that "he valued peace above all things and would not dream of beginning a war". In the footsteps of Bismarck, who managed to persuade the German people in 1870 that they have been too deeply humiliated by France not to draw the sword.

So we now build dreadnoughts, and the Kaiser and his government never stop singing us their song of peace, which we must safeguard as if it were the Holy Grail.

Therefore war. If we succeed – tant mieux. Then we can become pour de bon a military state and organise and rule the conquered lands with a firm military hand. Arm in order to conquer. Honestly and ruthlessly."

In 1914, Eulenburg welcomed and supported World War I, and was particularly proud of the way the German government made it appear that Russian mobilization had forced war on Germany. In a letter, Eulenburg wrote:

"'We were forced into the War by Russia'; so people think-and so they are supposed to think. The manner in which this "fact" was demonstrated to us by means of documents had a Bismarckian touch that appealed to me; was it Bethmann? Jagow? Zimmermann? I do not know. My guess is Zimmermann plus Jagow."

Eulenburg felt that the Austrian ultimatum to Serbia was "Prussian to the marrow" since its terms were cleanly meant to inspire rejection and he believed that nobody in the Austrian government was capable of writing such an ultimatum without German prompting. Eulenburg wrote that:

"It was officially maintained in Berlin that "the German Government was not aware of the content of the note". That may be so.

But who, in such case is the Government? Certainly it includes the Kaiser, the Reich Chancellor and the ministers. But the Government is not, for example Privy Councilor Zimmermann, the Chief of the General Staff and other gentlemen-who are even in a position to correct such a note.

What is undeniable, however, is that the note was a provocation...

All this, after our provocative move, was no more than a charade-it gratified me and brought back old memories"

Despite his disgrace, Eulenburg had many friends in the government, especially the military, and so was very well informed about German decision-making behind the scenes during the July Crisis. In reply to a letter, Eulenburg wrote his friend, General Helmuth von Moltke, the Chief of the General Staff, told him that he had "arrived at the conviction that-if it were still at all possible for us to win-we had to attack this year." On 2 June 1915, Eulenburg's favorite son Botho Sigwart zu Eulenburg was killed in action while fighting against the Russians in Galicia. Eulenburg—who had so welcomed the war in 1914-was emotionally devastated by the loss of Sigwart, and first began to develop some doubts about the war. Eulenburg was to spend the rest of his life attempting to contact the ghost of Sigwart via séances and other occult practices. In a December 1917 letter, Eulenburg wrote

"One can be in two minds about our foreign position, but not about the situation at home. Prussia leads Europe, but has herself fallen into the hands of foreigners, among whom I count the Kaiser and the Jews. For the Bethmanns too are nothing, but internationalist chatterboxes."

In a letter of 21 March 1918 about the Treaty of Brest-Litovsk, Eulenburg wrote:

"In whatever way we win, our victory must and will engender the most dreadful hatred of us, so that, with our great-grandchildren in mind, we must fashion frontiers which can provide a certain guarantee of safety in the military as well as the economic sphere. Of course we shall be able to use admiration-but the hatred will be greater and our geographically unfortunate position must be corrected if that well deserved admiration is not to be weakened by the accusation of stupidity. But who is to undertake the correction of unfortunate geographical position? Surely only the military genius of our Army leaders-or were you perhaps thinking of leaving it to our politicians? If the latter had not dug their grave long ago, we would now be calling it Brest-Litovsk."

After World War I, Eulenburg changed his mind about the war, and then claimed in his letters that, had he remained Ambassador to Austria during the July Crisis, he would have prevented the war. In a letter, Eulenburg asked whether one should "lay the blame on the Austrian Government alone because they followed the incitements of their stronger and therefore in military matters absolutely dominant ally?" Eulenburg argued that:

"Germany is the stronger of the Allies. Without her consent, Austria cannot go to war with Russia-Serbia. The stronger partner is in a position to propose a conference and the weaker is compelled to accept."

Eulenburg went on to write:

"Serbia is Russia. If Austria marches against Serbia and if Berlin does not prevent Austria's belligerent action, then the great breaking wave of World War rolls irresistibly towards us. I repeat: Berlin must know that, otherwise idiots live in the Wilhelmstrasse. Kaiser Wilhelm must know that.

If Austria takes the step upon which she has decided at the Cabinet meeting of July 7th and if Kaiser Wilhelm assures Austria of his loyalty to the Alliance under any circumstances, then he also shares Count Berchtold's policy with regard to war with Russia-and Russia is the ally of France.

The situation which I have briefly described here is an established fact that cannot be masked."

In a letter to his friend Wolfgang Putlitz, Eulenburg stated that his views about the truth of 1914 were "dangerous", and "this letter must be destroyed for the sake of the Fatherland." Eulenburg died in Liebenberg in 1921, aged 74.

== Marriage and family ==
On 20 November 1875, at Stockholm, Eulenburg married Augusta Sandels (Stockholm, 12 May 1853 – Liebenberg, 14 December 1941), daughter of Samuel August, the last Count Sandels (1810-1892), and of his wife, Hedvig Henrietta Emilie Augusta Tersmeden (1829-1899). Count Johan August Sandels was her grandfather. They had eight children:

- Philipp Graf zu Eulenburg (Wulkow, 16 November 1876 – Berlin, 28 June 1878)
- Astrid Gräfin zu Eulenburg (Berlin, 25 March 1879 – Paris, 23 March 1881)
- Alexandrine (Adine) Elise Klara Antonia Gräfin zu Eulenburg (Liebenberg, 1 July 1880 – Friedelhausen, 3 February 1957), married at Liebenberg, 15 June 1910 Eberhard Graf von Schwerin (Weilburg, 11 July 1882 – Giessen, 4 April 1954)
- Friedrich Wend 2. Fürst zu Eulenburg und Hertefeld Graf von Sandels (Starnberg, 19 September 1881 – Weeze, 1 August 1963), married at Liebenberg, 21 May 1904 Marie Freiin Mayr von Melnhof (Vienna, 8 April 1884 – Weeze, 3 February 1960)
- Augusta Alexandrine Gräfin zu Eulenburg (Starnberg, 1 September 1882 – Starnberg, 28 January 1974), married in London, 4 February 1907 (div 1931) Edmund Jaroljmek
- Sigwart Botho Philipp August Graf zu Eulenburg (Munich, 10 January 1884 – k.a. Jasło, Galicia, 2 June 1915), married in Leipzig, 21 September 1909 Helene Staegemann (Hannover, 18 April 1877 – Partenkirchen, 20 August 1923)
- Karl Kuno Eberhard Wend Graf zu Eulenburg (Starnberg, 16 June 1885 – Weeze, 4 December 1975), married firstly Saint Helier, Jersey, 27 May 1908 (div 1923) Sophie Moshammer (Munich, 9 April 1891 – Munich, 8 May 1944), married secondly in Munich, 5 November 1923 Geertruida Verwey (Utrecht, 6 May 1901 – Weeze, 28 October 1987)
- Viktoria Ada Astrid Agnes Gräfin zu Eulenburg (Starnberg, 13 July 1886 – Starnberg, 23 September 1967), married at Liebenberg, 12 May 1909 (div 1921) Otto Ludwig Haas-Heye (Heidelberg, 16 December 1879 – Mannheim, 9 June 1959) Viktoria is the great-grandmother of Sophie, Hereditary Princess of Liechtenstein.

== Works ==
Among his works are:

- Skaldengesänge ("Old Norse songs", 1892)
- Rosenlieder ("Rose Songs") – This collection of songs was quite popular in his lifetime and often performed in the salon of Marie von Schleinitz. It was recorded for EMI in 1976 by Cathy Berberian on the LP Wie einst in schöner'n Tagen. A version on CD was released in March 2013 on the EMI Electrola label.
- Dichtungen ("Poems," 1892)
- Das Weihnachtsbuch ("The Christmas book," 1892)
- Erich und Erika und andere Erzählungen für Kinder ("Eric and Erica and other tales for children," 1893)
- Abenderzählungen, Märchen und Träume ("Evening tales, stories, and dreams," 1894)

== Honours ==
He received the following orders and decorations:

- Kingdom of Prussia:
  - Knight of the Black Eagle, with Collar, January 1907
  - Grand Cross of the Red Eagle, with Crown and Oak Leaves
  - Knight of the Royal Crown Order, 1st Class
  - Commander's Star of the Royal House Order of Hohenzollern
  - Iron Cross, 2nd Class
- Brunswick: Grand Cross of the Order of Henry the Lion
- Kingdom of Bavaria:
  - Knight of the Merit Order of St. Michael, 1st Class, 1891; Grand Cross
  - Grand Cross of Merit of the Bavarian Crown, 1894
- (Principality of Schaumburg-Lippe) Lippe: Cross of Honour of the House Order of Lippe, 1st Class
- Mecklenburg: Grand Cross of the Wendish Crown, with Crown in Ore
- Oldenburg: Grand Cross of the Order of Duke Peter Friedrich Ludwig, with Golden Crown
- Württemberg: Grand Cross of the Friedrich Order, 1891
- (Austrian Empire) (Kingdom of Hungary) Austria-Hungary:
  - Grand Cross of the Imperial Order of Leopold, 1895
  - Grand Cross of the Royal Hungarian Order of St. Stephen, 1897
- Kingdom of Italy: Grand Cross of Saints Maurice and Lazarus
- Sweden:
  - Commander Grand Cross of the Polar Star, 1890
  - Commander Grand Cross of the Order of Vasa, 1895

Diplomatic posts
Preceded by Heinrich VII, Prince Reuss of Köstritz	Ambassador Extraordinary and Plenipotentiary of His Majesty the German Emperor to His Imperial and Royal Apostolic Majesty the Emperor of Austria & King of Hungary; 1894–1902	Succeeded by Karl Graf von Wedel
