= Friedrich Albrecht zu Eulenburg =

Prussian diplomat (1815–1881)

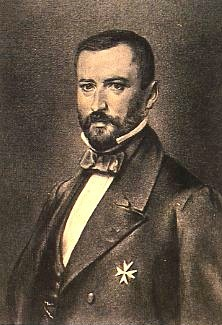
- Friedrich Albrecht zu Eulenburg

Interior Minister of Prussia
- In office 1862–1878

Member of the Abgeordnetenhaus (Prussia)
- In office 1866–1877
- Constituency: Breslau 2 (Militsch-Trebnitz)

Personal details
- Born: 29 June 1815 Königsberg, East Prussia
- Died: 2 June 1881 (aged 65) Berlin, Imperial Germany
- Occupation: Diplomat

Count Friedrich Albrecht zu Eulenburg (29 June 1815 – 2 June 1881) was a Prussian diplomat and politician. He led the Eulenburg Expedition and secured the Prusso-Japanese Treaty of 24 January 1861, which was similar to other unequal treaties that European powers held Eastern Countries to.

== Biography ==
Eulenburg was born in Königsberg. He was the oldest surviving child of Friedrich Leopold Graf zu Eulenburg (Prassen, 26 December 1787 - Königsberg, 30 July 1845) and Amalie Julie Eleonore née von Kleist (Perkuiken, 26 May 1792 - Königsberg, 16 November 1830).

Eulenburg studied law at the Universities of Königsberg and Bonn and worked as a government official in Oppeln then in various ministries in Berlin. In 1852 he entered the diplomatic service as the Prussian Consul-General in Antwerp. The expansion of Prussian trade led to the search of commercial partners in South-East and Eastern Asia and he was chosen to lead an extensive trade mission. Departing in October 1859 he set out for Japan, China and Siam.

On 24 January 1861, he concluded a Japanese-Prussian Treaty of Amity and Commerce with Muragaki Norimasa of the Tokugawa shogunate in Edo period, which was based on Anglo-Japanese Treaty of Amity and Commerce. In September the same year, he concluded a commercial treaty with the Qing Empire, which was similar to the Treaties of Tianjin that Britain and France had concluded with China three years earlier.

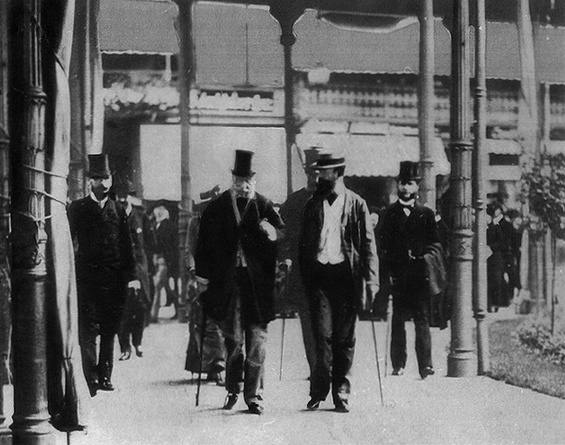
Wilhelm I of Prussia (with top hat) and Nikolaus zu Nassau at Bad Ems

Following his return he was appointed the Interior Minister of Prussia on 8 December 1862. Following the growth in the administrative area of Prussian state in 1864 and 1866, Eulenburg instituted comprehensive administrative reform also in the old provinces. However he was met by opposition by the Catholics in the west and the liberals in the east. He accompanied King Wilhelm I of Prussia in the negotiations with the French ambassador Count Benedetti at Bad Ems prior to the Franco-Prussian War.

His plan to reform the municipal administration in Prussia was opposed by Otto von Bismarck and Eulenburg resigned on 30 November 1878 to be succeeded by his first cousin once removed Botho zu Eulenburg.

== Family ==
Order of the Red Eagle, 2nd Class

Eulenburg's parents married at Königsberg on 23 October 1811. He was the brother of

- Adalbert Graf zu Eulenburg (10 November 1812 - 17 June 1814)
- Marie Gräfin zu Eulenburg (13 October 1813 - 10 February 1818)
- Eliese Gräfin zu Eulenburg (Königsberg, 27 August 1817 - Berlin, 15 June 1853), who died unmarried and without issue, and
- Philipp Graf zu Eulenburg (Königsberg, 24 April 1820 - Berlin, 5 March 1889), married in Berlin, 22 April 1846 Alexandrine Freiin von Rothkirch und Panthen (Glogau, 20 June 1824 - Meran, 11 April 1902), the parents of Prince Philip of Eulenburg.

Eulenburg was not married and had no children.

== Awards ==
- Knight of the Red Eagle, 2nd Class, 1862

Political offices
Preceded by Count Gustav Wilhelm von Jagow	Interior Minister of Prussia; 1862–1878	Succeeded by Count Botho zu Eulenburg
