= August von Kleist =

Prussian Major General

- Born: 19 February 1818; Perkuiken, East Prussia, Prussia
- Died: 14 May 1890 (aged 72); Potsdam, Brandenburg, German Empire
- Spouse(s): Emmeline von Morstein (m. 1851) Bertha von Ostau (m. 1869)
- Relatives: Erwin von Kleist, (1855–1910), son; Alfred von Kleist (1857–1921), son
- Military career
- Allegiance: Kingdom of Prussia (to 1866); German Empire (to 1872)
- Service years: 1835–72
- Rank: Major General
- Awards: Iron Cross

August Christoph Viktor von Kleist (19 February 1818, Perkuiken - 14 May 1890, Potsdam) was a Prussian Major General.

== Biography ==
=== Ancestry ===
August von Kleist descended from the female line of the dukes of Pomerania. He was the fourth son of the Prussian Rittmeister and lord of Perkuiken, Christoph Albrecht Leopold von Kleist (19 May 1789, Königsberg - 25 March 1823), and his wife, Emilie von Steinwehr (21 November 1790 - 5 August 1870, Lablacken, Königsberg).

=== Military career ===
August von Kleist chose a military career not only due his family's precarious financial situation, but also due to the early death of his father. He joined the Prussian Cadet Corps and was part of the Cadet School in Kulm and was further educated in Berlin. He then entered the army as a second lieutenant and joined the 1. artillery-brigade on 12 August 1835. From 1842-1847 he was the administrator of the artillery depots in Königsberg. He was then transferred to Memel in 1848, where he constructed the breach batteries which would become feared among the Danish Navy during its attack from Schleswig-Holstein in the First Schleswig War. After completing this task he was then promoted to first lieutenant and appointed brigade-adjunct. In this position he experienced the disorganization of the Prussian Army during the Mobilization of 1850, prompting him to write a brochure titled Die Notwendigkeit einer Modification unserer Armeeorganisation ("The Necessity of a modification to our Army's organizational structure"). The brochure was then banned from sale by the army supreme command. Later, in 1851, he was appointed to become an assistant to the Ordinance Examiners Commission and in 1852 was promoted to captain. After the completion of his work in Berlin he was then sent back to the army and in 1856 was promoted to Captain 1st Class and stationed at Magdeburg. He was then transferred to Wesel and promoted to major in 1859. In the end, he was transferred to the 3. Artilleriebrigade and soon promoted to Oberstleutnant (lieutenant colonel) and commander of the Prussian Artillery Crew of the Fortress of Mainz.

In 1866 he was promoted to Oberst (colonel) and commander of the 5. Artillerie-Festungsregiments (5th Artillery Fortress Regiment) and during the Austro-Prussian War was recognized for his outstanding performance at the battles of Glogau, Posen, Thorn and Graudenz. After the war, he became commander of the 2. (pommerschen) Artillerie-Brigade (2nd Pomeranian Artillery Brigade) in 1868 and in this position was promoted to major general on 26 July 1870. He participated in the Franco-Prussian War in 1870/1871, especially in the Battle of Gravelotte, the Siege of Metz and the Siege of Paris. After that, he participated in an expedition in the Jura, where his health was unable to bear the hardships of the campaign. He was classified as disabled and was released from the military in 1872 with a pension and the award of the Order of the Red Eagle.

=== Family ===
On 13 April 1851 August von Kleist married Emmeline von Morstein (1827-1866). They had two daughters and four sons, including the Prussian generals Erwin von Kleist and Alfred von Kleist. After the death of Emmeline married Bertha von Ostau (1855-1910) on 15 October 1869. That marriage was childless.

== Honours and awards ==
- Kingdom of Prussia:
  - Knight of the Order of the Crown, 2nd Class, 18 September 1869
  - Iron Cross (1870), 2nd Class
  - Knight of the Order of the Red Eagle, 2nd Class with Oak Leaves, 9 September 1872
  - Knight of Honour of the Johanniter Order, 15 February 1873

== Bibliography ==
- Kurt von Priesdorff: Soldatisches Führertum. Band 8. Hanseatische Verlagsanstalt Hamburg. o.J. S. 266–267.
- Genealogisches Handbuch des Adels. Band A XIII. C.A. Starke-Verlag. Limburg. 1975.
- Gustav Kratz: Die Geschichte des Geschlechts von Kleist. Band III. Nr. 883 digitalisat
