= List of interior ministers of Prussia =

Government official in Prussia

This page lists Prussian Ministers of the Interior.

== History ==
Upon the founding of the Prussian Interior Ministry in 1808 until the dissolution of the State of Prussia in 1945. The Prussian Interior Ministers were members of the Prussian State Ministry. The main building was at the street Unter den Linden.

== Interior ministers (1808–1934) ==
Name	Image	Term Start	Term End	Notes
Friedrich Ferdinand Alexander zu Dohna-Schlobitten		1808	1810	
Karl August von Hardenberg	Karl August von Hardenberg	1810	1814	Also served as Prime Minister from 1804 to 1806, 1807, 1810–1822
Friedrich von Schuckmann	Friedrich von Schuckmann	1814	1834	
Wilhelm zu Sayn-Wittgenstein-Hohenstein	Wilhelm zu Sayn-Wittgenstein-Hohenstein	1817	1819	Police Minister
Wilhelm von Humboldt	Wilhelm von Humboldt	1819	1819	
Friedrich von Schuckman		1819	1834	
Gustav von Brenn		1834	1838	
Gustav Adolf Rochus von Rochow		1838	1842	Minister of the Interior and Police
Adolf Heinrich von Arnim-Boitzenburg	Adolf Heinrich von Arnim-Boitzenburg	1842	1845	
Ernst von Bodelschwingh-Velmede	Ernst von Bodelschwingh-Velmede	1845	1848	
Alfred von Auerswald	Alfred von Auerswald	1848	1848	
Friedrich von Kühlwetter	Friedrich von Kühlwetter	1848	1848	
Franz August Eichmann	Franz August Eichmann	1848	1848	
Otto Theodor von Manteuffel	Otto Theodor von Manteuffel	1848	1850	
Ferdinand von Westphalen		1850	1858	
Eduard Heinrich von Flottwell	Eduard Heinrich von Flottwell	1858	1859	
Maximilian von Schwerin-Putzar	[Maximilian von Schwerin-Putzar	1859	1862	
Gustav von Jagow		1862	1862	
Friedrich Albrecht zu Eulenburg	Friedrich Albert zu Eulenberg	1862	1878	
Botho August Wendt zu Eulenburg-Wicken	Botho Wendt zu Eulenberg	1878	1881	
Robert Viktor von Puttkamer	Robert Viktor von Puttkamer	1881	1888	
Ernst Ludwig Herrfurth	Ernst Ludwig Herrfurth	1888	1892	
Botho August Wendt zu Eulenburg-Wicken	Botho Wendt zu Eulenberg	1892	1894	
Ernst Matthias von Köller	Ernst Matthias von Köller	1894	1895	
Gustav Wilhelm Eberhard von der Recke von der Horst	Eberhard von der Recke von der Horst	1895	1899	
Georg Kreuzwendedich von Rheinbaben	Georg von Rheinbaben	1899	1901	
Hans Christian Friedrich Wilhelm von Hammerstein-Loxten	Hans von Hammerstein-Loxten	1901	1905	
Theobald von Bethmann Hollweg	Theobald von Bethmann Hollweg	1905	1907	
Friedrich Ludwig Elisa von Moltke	Friedrich von Moltke	1907	1910	
Johann (Hans) Nikolaus Michael Louis von Dallwitz		1910	1914	
Friedrich Wilhelm von Loebell	Friedrich Wilhelm von Loebell	1914	1917	
Wilhelm (Bill) Arnold Drews		1917	1918	
Rudolf Breitscheid; Paul Hirsch	Rudolf Breitscheid	1918	1919	
Wolfgang Heine	Wolfgang Heine	1919	1920	
Carl Wilhelm Severing	Carl Severing	1920	1921	
Adolph Alexander Eberhard Dominicus	Alexander Dominicus	1921	1921	
Carl Wilhelm Severing	Carl Severing	1921	1926	
Albert Grzesinski	Albert Grzesinski	1926	1930	
Heinrich Waentig	Heinrich Waentig	1930	1930	
Carl Wilhelm Severing	Carl Severing	1930	1932	
Franz Bracht	Franz Bracht	1932	1933	Reich Commissioner (also Reich Minister of the Interior from December 3, 1932)
Hermann Göring	Hermann Göring	1933	1933	Reich Commissioner
Hermann Göring	Hermann Göring	1933	1934	Also Prime Minister from April 11, 1933
Wilhelm Frick	Wilhelm Frick	1934	1934	Reich Minister of the Interior since January 30, 1933

== See also ==
- Interior Ministers of Germany
