= Order of Merit of the Prussian Crown =

Award of Prussian Crown (1901–1918)

Order of Merit of the Prussian Crown Verdienstorden der Preußischen Krone
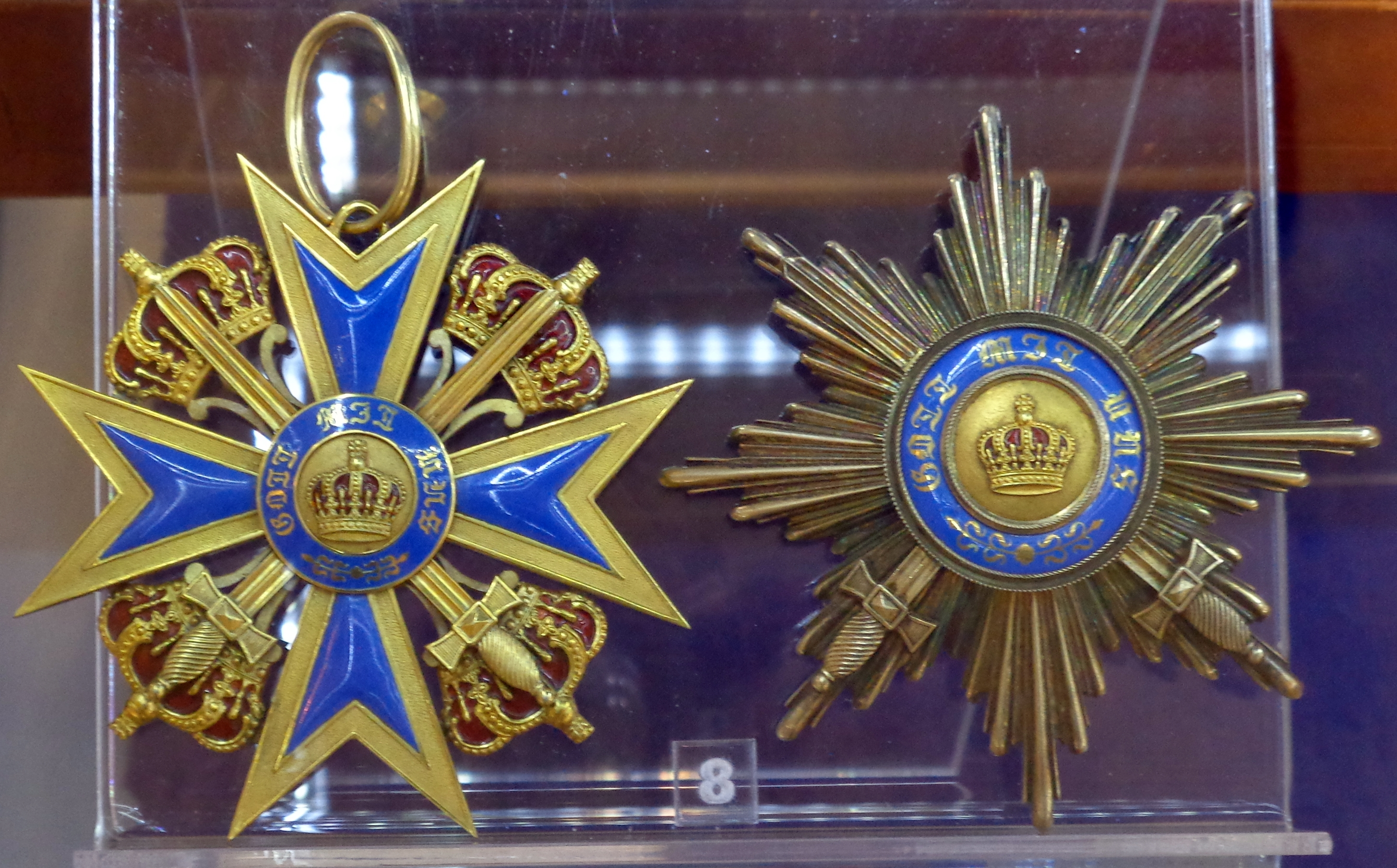
- Cross and star of the order

Awarded by Prussia
- Established: 18 January 1901
- Motto: Gott Mit Uns
- Eligibility: Civilian and Military
- Criteria: exceptional civil or military merit
- Georg Friedrich, Prince of Prussia

Statistics
- Last induction: 13 March 1918
- Total inductees: 57

Precedence
- Next (higher): Order of the Black Eagle
- Next (lower): Order of the Red Eagle
- Ribbon of the order

The Order of Merit of the Prussian Crown (Verdienstorden der Preußischen Krone) was an award of civil and military merit established 18 January 1901 by King Wilhelm II on the occasion of the bicentennial of the establishment of the Kingdom of Prussia. The order was presented in one class and consisted of a badge and a breast star. For military merit the award was presented with crossed swords. The order was presented once with diamonds.

== Description of the award ==
The order consists of a badge, worn on a sash from right shoulder to the left hip, and a star worn on the left chest:

The badge of the order is a blue-enamelled, eighteen-karat, yellow-gold Maltese cross with a granular border. In each of the compartments between the four arms of the cross is a red-enamelled crown surmounting the royal monogram ("W II", for Wilhelm II). The central disc on the obverse of the badge shows a golden crown with red enamel, surrounded by a blue-enamelled circular band bearing the gold-lettered motto, "Gott Mit Uns". The disc on the reverse bears the intertwined initials "IR W II" (for "Imperator Rex Wilhelm II": "Emperor King William II"), encircled by the date "18 January 1901".

The star of the order is a golden eight-pointed star with straight rays, displaying the central disc from the obverse of the badge.

The sash of the order is blue, edged with orange stripes.

== Awards ==
The medal was awarded only 57 times. General von Gossler was the only person who received the awards in both departments.

=== Recipients ===
- King William II of Prussia on 18 January 1901
- Prince Albert of Prussia, Regent of the Duchy of Braunschweig on 18 January 1901
- Baron Walter von Loë, Prussian colonel general of cavalry and adjutant general on 18 January 1901
- Count Vladimir Lamsdorf, Russian Minister of Foreign Affairs on 21 September 1901
- Count Paul von Hatzfeldt-Wildenburg, German Ambassador in London on 8 November 1901
- Küçük Mehmet Sait Pasha, Ottoman Grand Vizier on 24 May 1902
- Crown Prince Vajiravudh of Siam, on 30 May 1902, during a visit to Berlin
- Giulio Prinetti, Italian Foreign Minister, in late August 1902, during the visit to Germany of King Victor Emmanuel III of Italy
- Otto von Strubberg, Prussian general of infantry, 21 October 1902
- Prince Hermann von Hatzfeldt-Trachenberg, Prussian Oberpräsident of Silesia on 22 June 1903
- Konrad Ernst von Gossler, Prussian general of infantry on 14 August 1903
- Arthur Freiherr von Bolfras, Austrian field-marshal and Adjutant General on 18 September 1903
- Alexander Count of Uexküll-Gyllenband, Austrian general and commander of the 2nd Corps on 18 September 1903
- Hugo von Abensperg und Traun, Austrian Grand Chamberlain 19 September 1903
- Count Károly Khuen-Héderváry, Hungarian Prime Minister on 19 September 1903
- Frank Lascelles, British Ambassador in Berlin on 30 June 1904
- Damat Ferid Pasha, Ottoman Grand Vizier on 24 September 1904
- Count Eberhard zu Solms-Sonnenwalde, Prussian retired diplomat 18 October 1904
- Albert von Mischke, Prussian general and adjutant general of the infantry on 18 October 1904
- Ernst von der Planitz, Prussian general of the Cavalry and Inspector General of Cavalry, on 1 May 1905
- Alexandr Petrovic Strukov, Russian General of Cavalry on 4 June 1905
- Count August zu Eulenburg, Prussian Minister of State on 2 July 1905
- Gustav Graf zu Castell-Castell, Bavarian Lieutenant-General and High Steward on 14 November 1905
- Baron Max Wladimir von Beck, Austrian Prime Minister on 22 June 1906
- Sándor Wekerle, Hungarian Prime Minister on 22 June 1906
- Ferdinand Fiedler, Austrian Feldzeugmeister and commanding general of 2nd Corps on 7 May 1908
- Leopold Graf von Gudenus, Great Chamberlain of Austro-Hungarian Empire on 7 May 1908
- Bela Graf Cziráky von Czirák und Dénesfalva, Austrian Grand Marshal of the Court on 7 May 1908
- Arvid Lindman, Swedish Prime Minister on 3 August 1908
- Hemming Gadd, Swedish general of the infantry on 3 August 1908
- Max von Hausen, Saxon Infantry General and Minister of State on 10 September 1908
- Ahmed Tevfik Pasha, Ottoman Marshal on 10 September 1908
- Julius von Verdy du Vernois, Prussian general of infantry on 1 March 1909
- Pyotr Arkadyevitch Stolypin, Russian Prime Minister on 17 June 1909
- Count Franz Conrad von Hötzendorf, head of the Austrian General Staff on 9 September 1909
- Franz Xaver von Schönaich, Austrian Infantry General and Minister of War on 9 September 1909
- Carl von Horn, Bavarian Infantry General and Minister of War on 17 September 1909
- Wilhelm von Linden-Suden, Prussian general of infantry on 7 April 1911
- Hermann von Blomberg, Prussian general of infantry on 13 September 1911
- Georg von Kleist, Prussian general of the cavalry on 6 April 1912
- Jules Greindl, Belgian Minister of State on 24 May 1912
- Sergei Dmitrievich Sazonov, Russian Foreign Minister on 4 July 1912
- Hans von Kirchbach, Saxon general of the artillery on 13 September 1912
- Prince Katsura Tarō, Japanese Lord Keeper of the Privy Seal on 19 September 1912
- Peter von Wiedenmann, Bavarian Artillery General and Adjutant General on 19 December 1912
- Maximilian von Seinsheim, Bavarian Grand Master of the Court on 19 December 1912
- Victor von Podbielski, Prussian Minister of State on 16 June 1913
- Walter Reinhold von Mossner, Prussian general of the cavalry on 16 June 1913
- Clemens von Delbrück, Prussian Minister of State on 24 June 1914
- Ludwig Freiherr von Hammerstein-Loxten, Prussian general of infantry on 12 May 1917
- Reinhold Kraetke, Prussian Secretary of State of the Reichspost bureau on 6 August 1917
- General Paul von Ploetz, Prussian general of infantry on 13 March 1918

=== Recipients with swords ===
- Kan'in, Prince of Japan on 22 March 1906
- Marquis Ōyama Iwao, Japanese Marshal on 22 March 1906
- Karl Ludwig d'Elsa, Saxon Colonel General on 2 January 1917
- Konrad Ernst von Gossler, Prussian general of infantry on 10 February 1917
- Ernst von Hoiningen, Prussian general of infantry on 6 March 1917

=== Recipients with diamonds ===
- Maximilian von Seinsheim, Bavarian Grand Master of the Court on 15 December 1913

== Bibliography ==
- Jörg Nimmergut: Deutsche Orden und Ehrenzeichen bis 1945. Band 2. Limburg – Reuss. Zentralstelle für wissenschaftliche Ordenskunde, München 1997, ISBN 3-00-001396-2.
- Kurt-Gerhard Klietmann: Der Verdienstorden der Preußischen Krone, Mitteilung aus dem Institut für Wissenschaftliche Ordenskunde, Der Herold - Band 12, 32. Jahrgang 1989, Heft 9
