= Perkujki =

- Village
- Location within Poland
- Coordinates: 54°14′N 20°46′E
- Country: Poland
- Voivodeship: Warmian-Masurian
- County: Bartoszyce
- Gmina: Bartoszyce

Perkujki [pɛrˈkui̯kʲi] (German: Perkuiken) is a village in the administrative district of Gmina Bartoszyce, within Bartoszyce County, Warmian-Masurian Voivodeship, in northern Poland, close to the border with the Kaliningrad Oblast of Russia.

== People ==
- August von Kleist (1818-1890), Prussian Major General
