= Axel Varnbüler von und zu Hemmingen =

German diplomat and Württemberg envoy (1851–1937)

- Born: Theodor Maria Julius Albert Alfred Axel Varnbüler von und zu Hemmingen; 10 January 1851; Hemmingen, Kingdom of Württemberg
- Died: 8 February 1937 (aged 86); Hemmingen, Germany
- Occupations: Diplomat, civil servant
- Title: Freiherr (Baron)
- Spouse: Natascha Gawriliuk (m. 1894)
- Children: 3
- Father: Karl von Varnbüler und zu Hemmingen
- Relatives: Hildegard von Spitzemberg (sister)

Axel Varnbüler von und zu Hemmingen (10 January 1851 – 8 February 1937), also known as Theodor Axel Freiherr Varnbüler von und zu Hemmingen, was a German diplomat, jurist and civil servant who represented the Kingdom of Württemberg at the imperial court in Berlin from 1894 until the end of the German Empire in November 1918. He previously served as a Prussian district administrator and as Württemberg's diplomatic representative in Saint Petersburg and Vienna.

Varnbüler was a member of the Liebenberg Circle, the informal association of aristocrats, diplomats and military officers surrounding Philipp, Prince of Eulenburg, and maintained personal relations with Emperor Wilhelm II. His friendships with Eulenburg and the Prussian general Kuno von Moltke dated from the Franco-Prussian War of 1870–1871.

== Early life and family ==
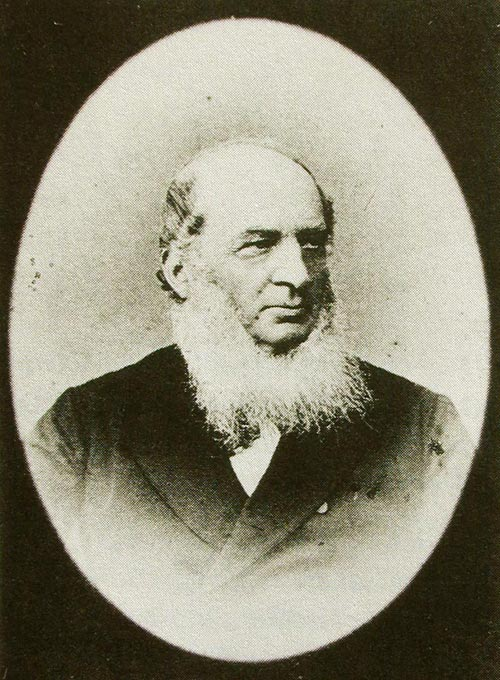
Karl von Varnbüler und zu Hemmingen (1809–1889), Axel's father, who served as Minister-President and Foreign Minister of Württemberg.

Axel Varnbüler was born on 10 January 1851 in Hemmingen, near Stuttgart, into the aristocratic Varnbüler von und zu Hemmingen family. He was the youngest of seven children born to Karl von Varnbüler und zu Hemmingen (1809–1889) and Henriette, née Freiin von Süßkind (1815–1902). His father was a prominent statesman who served as Minister-President and Foreign Minister of Württemberg from 1864 to 1870 and later represented the kingdom in the German Reichstag.

The Varnbüler family had been associated with Hemmingen since the seventeenth century. An ancestor, Johann Konrad Varnbüler (1595–1657), had participated in the negotiations leading to the Peace of Westphalia and was granted the estate of Hemmingen in recognition of his service to Württemberg. In November 1650, Emperor Ferdinand III elevated him to the hereditary rank of Freiherr (baron).

Axel's elder sister, Hildegard von Spitzemberg (1843–1914), became a prominent Berlin salon hostess during the Imperial period. Through her marriage to Karl von Spitzemberg, who had served as Württemberg's envoy in Berlin, the family maintained extensive connections within the Prussian aristocracy and diplomatic establishment. These connections later proved valuable to Axel during his own diplomatic career.

=== Education and military service ===
In 1869, Varnbüler began studying law and political science at the University in Berlin. His education was interrupted by the outbreak of the Franco-Prussian War in July 1870, when he was called into military service as a reserve lieutenant.

During the war, he became acquainted with Kuno von Moltke and Philipp von Eulenburg, both of whom subsequently became prominent figures in the entourage of Wilhelm II. According to historian Peter Bohl, the friendships established during this period remained important throughout Varnbüler's life.

After the war, Varnbüler resumed his legal education in Berlin. In 1879, he obtained a doctorate in law, subsequently entering the Prussian civil service as an Assessor, a legal administrative official.

== Administrative and diplomatic career ==
=== Prussian civil service ===
Following his legal qualification, Varnbüler entered the Prussian administration. In 1884, he had become district administrator in Tarnowitz, a town in the Prussian Province of Silesia. His responsibilities included supervising the local district administration and implementing government policy within the Prussian provincial system.

During his years in Upper Silesia, Varnbüler established contacts with members of the regional aristocracy, including families who remained among his personal and political acquaintances for the remainder of his life.

In 1890, he left the Prussian civil service and entered the diplomatic service of his native Kingdom of Württemberg. According to Bohl, his transfer initially encountered reservations within the government. Nevertheless, Varnbüler was appointed Württemberg's diplomatic representative in Saint Petersburg, the capital of the Russian Empire, and subsequently served for a short period in Vienna, the capital of Austria-Hungary.

=== Envoy to Berlin ===
In 1894, Varnbüler was appointed Württemberg's envoy in Berlin, a position he held until November 1918. He also served as the kingdom's plenipotentiary at the Bundesrat, the federal council of the German Empire.

As Württemberg's representative, Varnbüler acted as an intermediary between the government in Stuttgart and the imperial institutions in Berlin. His appointment placed him within the political and diplomatic environment of the imperial capital, where representatives of the German federal states participated in legislation and maintained relations with the Prussian court.

His family background and personal connections facilitated his integration into Berlin society. His sister Hildegard von Spitzemberg hosted a well-known political salon attended by diplomats, senior officials and members of the aristocracy. Varnbüler also maintained friendships among the Silesian nobility and cultivated personal relationships with members of the emperor's entourage.

As a member of the diplomatic establishment, he participated in important ceremonial occasions. In June 1895, he received an invitation to attend the inauguration of the Kiel Canal, then known as the Kaiser Wilhelm Canal. The invitation is preserved among his personal papers in the Hauptstaatsarchiv Stuttgart.

His service continued through the final years of the nineteenth century and the reign of Wilhelm II, including the political upheavals associated with the First World War. His diplomatic career ended following the German Revolution and the abolition of the monarchy in November 1918. His formal retirement was recorded in an official document dated 25 November 1918.

== Association with the Liebenberg Circle ==
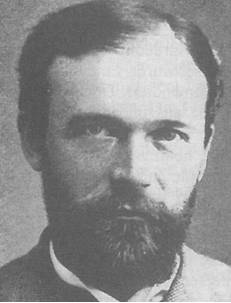
Philipp, Prince of Eulenburg, a close friend of Varnbüler and the central figure of the Liebenberg Circle.

Axel Varnbüler was a member of the Liebenberg Circle, an informal network of aristocrats, diplomats and military officers associated with Philipp, Prince of Eulenburg, and the court of Emperor Wilhelm II. His connection to the group originated during the Franco-Prussian War of 1870–1871, when he became acquainted with Eulenburg and the Prussian officer Kuno von Moltke. According to historian Peter Bohl, these acquaintances developed into close friendships that lasted throughout Varnbüler's life.

The circle took its name from Liebenberg Castle in Brandenburg, the country estate of Eulenburg, where members of the emperor's entourage frequently gathered for hunting, musical performances and private social occasions. Although it was not a formal political organization, the group attracted attention because of the privileged access enjoyed by its members to Wilhelm II. Varnbüler's position as Württemberg's diplomatic representative in Berlin from 1894 enabled him to maintain both official contacts with the imperial government and personal relationships within the emperor's aristocratic entourage. These connections also extended to his family, particularly through his sister Hildegard von Spitzemberg, a prominent Berlin salon hostess.

The surviving correspondence illustrates Varnbüler's familiarity with the emperor and the informal language used within the circle. In a letter to Moltke dated 4 June 1898, Varnbüler described an encounter with Wilhelm II in Berlin's Tiergarten. According to his account, the emperor stopped him, commented on his riding clothes and asked about Moltke, complaining that he could obtain little information from either Moltke or Eulenburg. Varnbüler referred to the emperor by the affectionate nickname Liebchen ("darling"), which circulated among members of the Liebenberg Circle. Historian Jonathan Steinberg cites the letter as evidence of the unusually intimate personal relationships within the emperor's aristocratic entourage. Varnbüler's personal connection to Wilhelm II continued into the twentieth century; the emperor became godfather to his youngest son, Wilhelm Varnbüler, who was photographed with him in 1910.

=== Involvement in the Harden–Eulenburg affair ===
Varnbüler's association with the Liebenberg Circle acquired particular significance during the Harden–Eulenburg affair of 1906–1909. The scandal began when journalist Maximilian Harden, editor of the political weekly Die Zukunft, published allegations concerning the private lives and political influence of Eulenburg and his associates. Harden portrayed the circle as an influential group of men whose intimate personal relationships had allegedly allowed them to exercise inappropriate influence over the emperor and German foreign policy. The accusations developed into a series of widely publicized legal proceedings, particularly those involving Eulenburg and Moltke.

Although Varnbüler was a member of Eulenburg's inner circle, he avoided the public consequences experienced by several of his associates. Historian Norman Domeier identifies Varnbüler as belonging to the innermost circle of the Eulenburg group and states that he escaped the scandal without personal repercussions because he remained silent following a warning from Harden. Unlike Eulenburg and Moltke, Varnbüler did not become a central defendant in the legal proceedings. His association with the group nevertheless placed him among the aristocratic acquaintances whose personal relationships were subjected to increasing political scrutiny.

In his unpublished memoirs, Varnbüler subsequently attempted to defend Eulenburg against allegations concerning the sexual character of his male friendships. He described these relationships as highly idealistic and sometimes emotionally intense, while rejecting interpretations that attributed a homosexual significance to them. Varnbüler maintained that Eulenburg's friendships with men represented a form of emotional companionship distinct from his romantic and sexual interests in women. In support of this interpretation, he suggested that Eulenburg's male friendships provided relief from his attractions to women other than his wife, Augusta.

Historians have questioned the reliability of Varnbüler's retrospective defence. John C. G. Röhl, who cited the unpublished memoirs in his edition of Eulenburg's political correspondence, suggested that Varnbüler's account was intended more to justify his friend's conduct before posterity than to establish the actual nature of his relationships. Domeier similarly characterizes Varnbüler's explanation as apologetic and contrasts it with the observations recorded by Varnbüler's sister, Hildegard von Spitzemberg, in her diaries. Spitzemberg expressed skepticism about Eulenburg's accounts of his romantic experiences with women, noting discrepancies between his dramatic descriptions and the circumstances of the events he recounted.

The affair had lasting consequences for the social network surrounding Wilhelm II. Eulenburg's influence at court collapsed, while Moltke's military reputation and career were damaged by the public proceedings. Varnbüler, by contrast, retained his position as Württemberg's envoy in Berlin and continued to serve as its representative at the Bundesrat until the abolition of the monarchy in November 1918. His continued diplomatic service distinguished his experience from that of the principal figures targeted during the scandal.

== Personal life ==
The three sons of Axel and Natascha Varnbüler, photographed in Berlin in 1904: Johann Konrad (1895–1918), Waldemar (1897–1929), and Wilhelm (1899–1945). Photograph by Erich Sellin.

In 1894, Varnbüler married Natascha (Natalie) Gawriliuk, a Russian woman whom he had met during his diplomatic posting in Saint Petersburg. She had previously been married to the industrialist Karl von Siemens, from whom she obtained a divorce before marrying Varnbüler.

The couple had three sons:

- Johann Konrad Varnbüler (1895–1918).
- Waldemar Varnbüler (1897–1929).
- Wilhelm Karl Ulrich Varnbüler (1899–1945).

Only Wilhelm survived his father. Contemporary photographs of the children, including a 1904 portrait made in Berlin, are preserved in the family archive in Stuttgart.

The youngest son, Wilhelm, was a godson of Emperor Wilhelm II. A photograph taken in 1910 shows the emperor together with Wilhelm Varnbüler, illustrating the family's continuing personal connections with the imperial household. He died in French captivity on 13 September 1945, four months after the end of the Second World War in Europe. His remains were interred in the family's hereditary burial ground, known as the Baronsfriedhöfle, in Hemmingen in October 1952.

He maintained an extensive correspondence with relatives, friends, diplomats and members of the German aristocracy.

== Later life and death ==
Following the collapse of the German monarchy in November 1918, Varnbüler retired from diplomatic service and returned to the family estate at Hemmingen in Württemberg. There he devoted himself to managing his agricultural properties and pursuing his interests in hunting and painting.

Although he no longer held public office, he maintained correspondence and social relationships with members of the aristocracy. He was particularly close to the Henckel von Donnersmarck family, with whom he exchanged numerous letters and participated in social activities. He also travelled regularly to Bavaria and Austria for visits and spa treatments.

His retirement coincided with significant personal losses. His eldest son Johann Konrad had died in 1918, and his second son Waldemar died in 1929. His wife Natascha also died before him, leaving Wilhelm as his only surviving son.

Axel Varnbüler died on 8 February 1937 in Hemmingen, aged 86.

== Archives and historical sources ==
Varnbüler's personal papers are preserved in the Hauptstaatsarchiv Stuttgart, part of the Landesarchiv Baden-Württemberg, within the family archive of the Freiherren Varnbüler von und zu Hemmingen (collection P 10).

The collection contains extensive family and political correspondence, diaries, photographs, legal documents, artistic works and records relating to his diplomatic career. It also preserves material concerning his friendships with Philipp von Eulenburg, Kuno von Moltke and other members of the imperial court.

The archive was transferred from the family's ancestral residence at Hemmingen to Stuttgart in several stages. Additional material was deposited in 2006 and 2008, including photographs, paintings, drawings and correspondence relating to Axel Varnbüler, his wife, children and other family members.

In 2010, historian Peter Bohl published a biographical account of Varnbüler in Archivnachrichten, the journal of the Baden-Württemberg State Archives. Bohl described the surviving correspondence as an important source for understanding the political, social and personal life of the German aristocracy in the late nineteenth and early twentieth centuries.

== See also ==
- Liebenberg Circle
- Philipp, Prince of Eulenburg
- Kuno von Moltke
- Wilhelm II, German Emperor
- Eulenburg affair
- Karl von Varnbüler und zu Hemmingen
