= Liebenberg Circle =

The Liebenberg Circle (German: Liebenberger Kreis), also known as the Liebenberg Round Table (Liebenberger Tafelrunde), was an informal group of aristocrats, military officers and diplomats associated with Emperor Wilhelm II of Germany between 1886 and 1907. The circle took its name from Liebenberg Castle, the country estate of Philipp, Prince of Eulenburg, in the Province of Brandenburg, where its members frequently gathered for hunting, music, theatrical performances and private discussions.

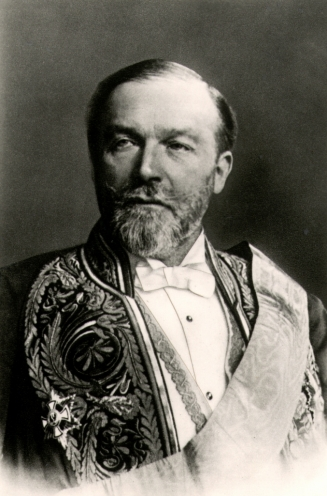
Philipp, Prince of Eulenburg, the central figure of the Liebenberg Circle, photographed in 1895.

Although primarily a social gathering, the circle acquired political significance through the personal relationship between Eulenburg and Wilhelm II. Eulenburg became an influential adviser to the emperor and supported the appointment of Bernhard von Bülow as Imperial Chancellor in 1900. Historians have examined the circle's role in Wilhelm's system of personal government and the relationship between aristocratic sociability and political decision-making in the German Empire.

The circle became the focus of public controversy during the Harden–Eulenburg affair of 1906–1909, when journalist Maximilian Harden accused prominent members of homosexual conduct and inappropriate political influence. The resulting trials and press campaigns severely damaged the reputations of Eulenburg and his associates, contributing to the dissolution of the circle and provoking a major public debate about homosexuality, masculinity and political authority in Imperial Germany.

== Origins and formation ==
The Liebenberg Circle was founded in the personal friendships that Philipp von Eulenburg had made during his military service and university years. Born into Prussian nobility he got to know men of similar aristocratic background, many of whom went on to careers in the military or diplomatic service: Kuno von Moltke, Axel von Varnbüler and several members of leading Prussian noble families were among his closest friends.

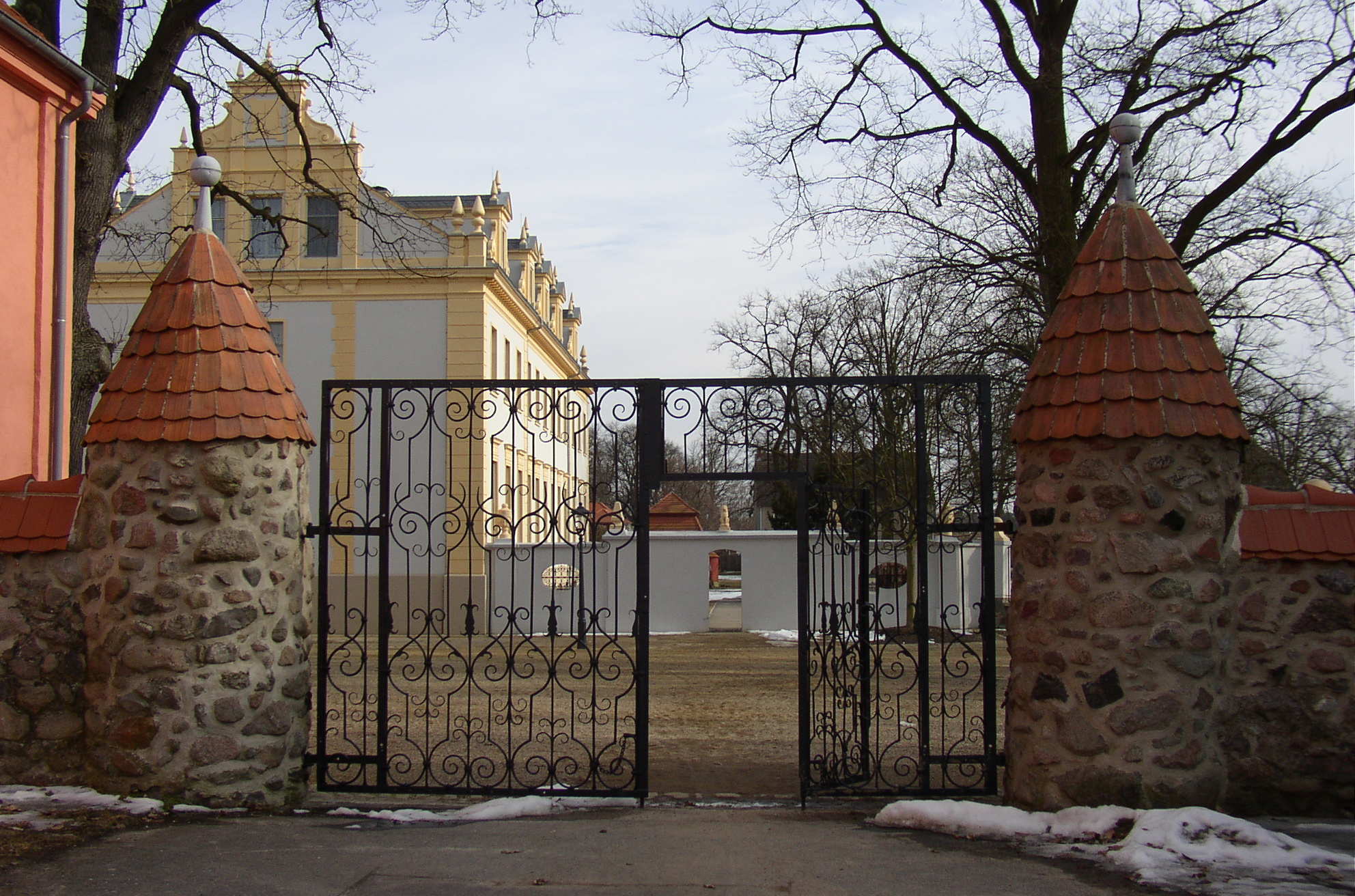
Liebenberg Castle in Brandenburg, the estate of Philipp von Eulenburg and principal meeting place of the circle.

In 1886, Eulenburg became acquainted with Prince Wilhelm of Prussia, the grandson of Emperor Wilhelm I and the future Wilhelm II. The two developed a close friendship, and Eulenburg soon became one of the prince's most trusted companions. Their relationship provided the foundation for an informal gathering of friends centred on Eulenburg's estate at Liebenberg, north of Berlin.

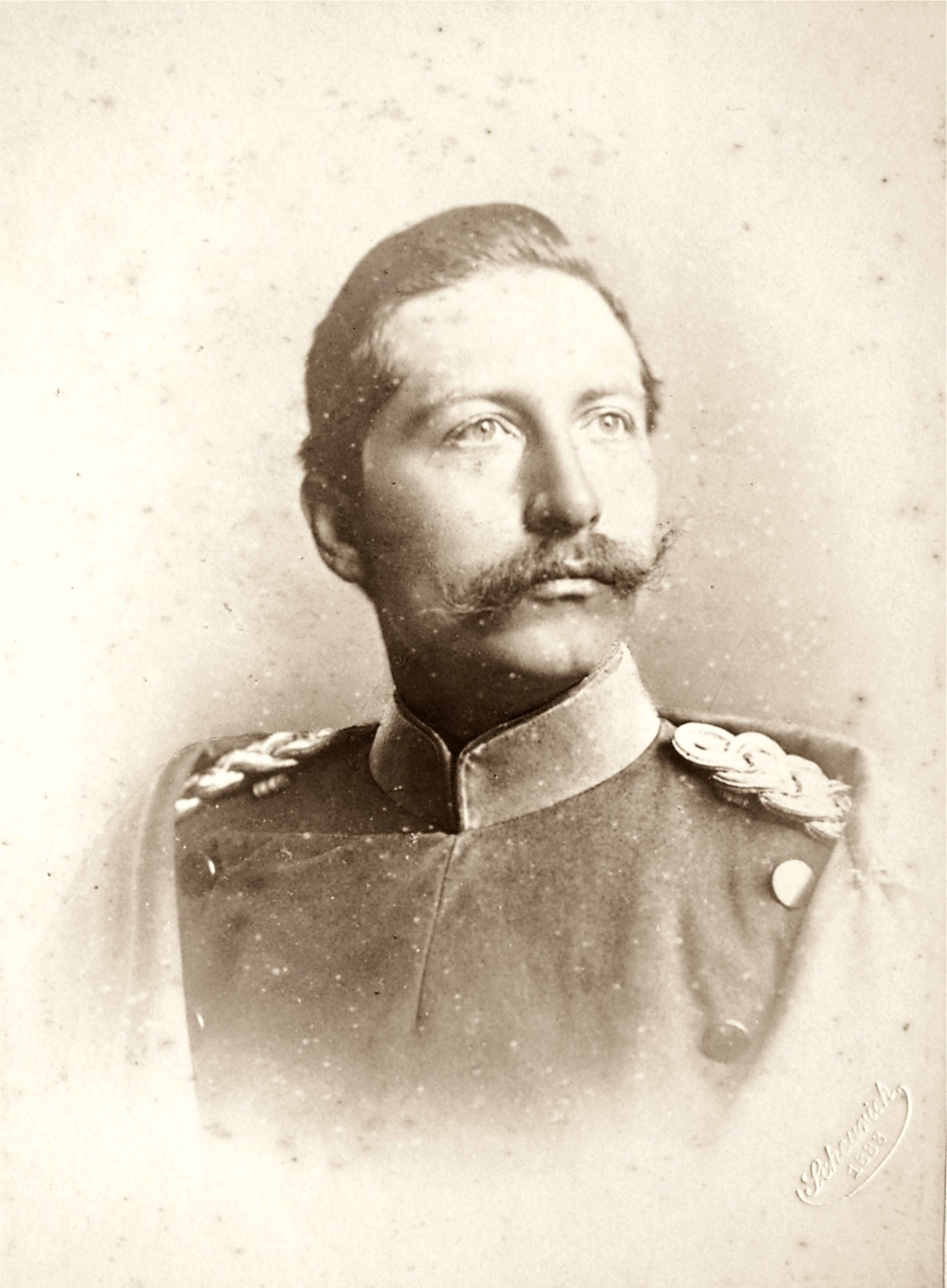
Wilhelm II in 1888, the year of his accession to the German throne.

Following Wilhelm's accession to the imperial throne in June 1888, Eulenburg's position within the court became increasingly important. Wilhelm frequently visited Liebenberg, where he participated in activities away from the formal ceremonies and obligations of the imperial court. The estate offered an environment in which the emperor could interact with a relatively small group of familiar companions.

According to historian Claudia Bruns, Eulenburg's circle combined aristocratic privilege with an emphasis on emotional friendship, artistic expression and shared cultural interests. Its members maintained close personal relationships that differed from the more rigid ideals of military masculinity prevalent in contemporary Prussian society.

== Social and cultural activities ==
The Liebenberg Circle was distinguished by its cultural and recreational activities. Gatherings included hunting expeditions, musical performances, theatrical entertainments and literary discussions. Eulenburg was an accomplished musician, singer and composer, and his artistic interests helped establish the character of the gatherings.

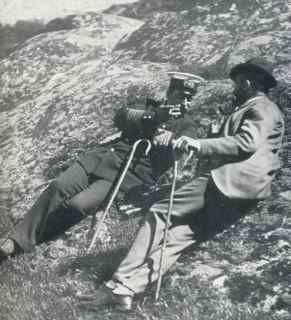
Emperor Wilhelm II and Philipp von Eulenburg during a northern European voyage in 1890.

Several other members possessed artistic talents. Kuno von Moltke was a pianist and composer of military music, while Axel von Varnbüler was known for his caricatures and illustrations. Emil von Schlitz, Count von Görtz, and Georg von Hülsen-Haeseler participated in theatrical productions and other entertainments arranged for the emperor.

Members also accompanied Wilhelm II on his annual voyages to northern Europe, particularly his journeys through the Norwegian fjords aboard the imperial yacht SMY Hohenzollern. These excursions provided additional opportunities for informal social interaction between the emperor and his companions.

Correspondence between members of the circle frequently employed affectionate nicknames and expressions of personal attachment. Eulenburg was referred to as "Phili", while Wilhelm II was sometimes called "Liebchen", meaning "darling" or "sweetheart". Kuno von Moltke was known among his friends as "der Süße" ("the sweet one").

Historian Claudia Kreklau has interpreted the group's language, performances and social practices as forms of a distinctive queer social environment centred on the emperor. Her analysis emphasizes the importance of aristocratic male friendship and the historical differences between the group's self-understanding and modern categories of sexual identity.

== Members ==
The circle was not a formal organization and had no established membership requirements. Its composition reflected Eulenburg's personal friendships and the emperor's social and political connections.

Prominent figures associated with the circle included:

- Philipp, Prince of Eulenburg (1847–1921), diplomat, musician and close confidant of Wilhelm II, whose Liebenberg estate served as the principal meeting place.
- Kuno von Moltke (1847–1923), Prussian lieutenant general, imperial aide-de-camp and later military commandant of Berlin.
- Axel von Varnbüler (1851–1937), diplomat and Württemberg representative at the Bundesrat, who belonged to Eulenburg's longstanding circle of friends.
- Eberhard zu Dohna-Schlobitten (1846–1905), Prussian aristocrat and chamberlain who participated in the circle's theatrical entertainments.
- Emil von Schlitz (1851–1914), known as Count von Görtz, artist and close friend of Wilhelm II.
- Georg von Hülsen-Haeseler (1858–1922), theatre administrator and general director of the Prussian court theatres.
- Dietrich von Hülsen-Haeseler (1852–1908), Prussian general and chief of the imperial Military Cabinet.
- Friedrich Botho von Eulenburg (1850–1914), younger brother of Philipp von Eulenburg.

The circle also maintained connections with other members of the imperial political and diplomatic establishment. Bernhard von Bülow, who became Imperial Chancellor in 1900, was closely associated with Eulenburg, although his relationship with the group was primarily political rather than recreational.

== Political influence ==
Following Wilhelm II's accession in 1888, the Liebenberg Circle acquired political importance because of its members' privileged access to the emperor. Eulenburg became an important intermediary between Wilhelm and members of the imperial administration, providing advice on appointments and political affairs.

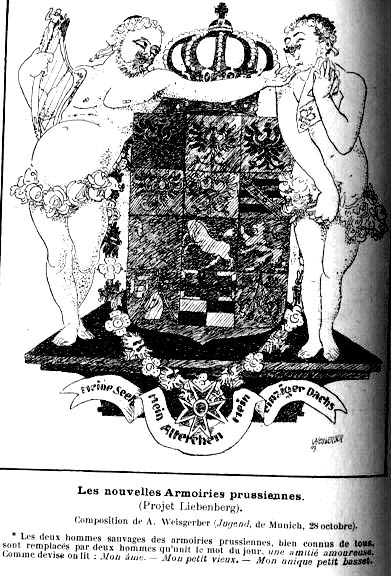
The New Coat of Arms of the Kingdom of Prussia: Project Liebenberg, a political caricature by Albert Weisgerber, published in Jugend on 28 October 1907, satirizing the Eulenburg affair.

The precise extent of the circle's influence has been debated by historians. John C. G. Röhl has emphasized the importance of Eulenburg in the development of Wilhelm II's system of personal government, particularly during the 1890s. Under this system, the emperor sought to exercise greater personal control over political decisions rather than relying exclusively on the Imperial Chancellor and established governmental institutions.

One of Eulenburg's most significant political interventions was his support for Bernhard von Bülow, whose appointment as Imperial Chancellor in October 1900 represented an important development in the relationship between the imperial court and the government. Eulenburg had promoted Bülow's career and regarded him as a suitable political partner for the emperor.

The circle nevertheless lacked a unified political programme or formal institutional authority. Its influence depended upon individual relationships with Wilhelm II rather than an established structure of political decision-making. Historian Isabel V. Hull has examined how such informal aristocratic networks operated within the institutions of the imperial court and contributed to the exercise of personal monarchical power.

Bruns has also examined the cultural and ideological attitudes shared within the circle, including the circulation of racial theories and antisemitic ideas. Eulenburg introduced the racial theorist Houston Stewart Chamberlain to Wilhelm II in 1901. Such connections reflected broader ideological currents within sections of the German aristocracy and imperial political establishment.

Eulenburg's influence began to decline around the turn of the twentieth century. In 1902, he resigned from his position as German ambassador to Austria-Hungary and withdrew increasingly to Liebenberg. Although he remained personally acquainted with Wilhelm II, his earlier role as a central figure in the emperor's political entourage gradually diminished.

== Harden–Eulenburg affair ==
The Liebenberg Circle became the centre of a major political and social controversy following accusations published by journalist Maximilian Harden in his weekly journal Die Zukunft. Beginning in November 1906, Harden criticized the influence of Eulenburg and his associates on Wilhelm II, presenting the group as an informal network that exercised excessive influence over imperial policy.

Harden was particularly critical of what he regarded as Eulenburg's conciliatory approach to foreign affairs. He believed that the emperor's advisers had contributed to Germany's diplomatic difficulties during the First Moroccan Crisis of 1905–1906 and had encouraged policies that weakened Germany's position among the European powers.

The controversy intensified when Harden's articles suggested that prominent members of the circle engaged in homosexual relationships. Eulenburg and Moltke became the principal targets of the accusations. At the time, sexual acts between men were criminalized under Paragraph 175 of the German Criminal Code, while public allegations of homosexuality could destroy the careers and reputations of senior military officers and public officials.

In 1907, Moltke brought a defamation action against Harden, initiating a series of legal proceedings that attracted considerable attention in Germany and abroad. Court testimony examined Moltke's marriage, his friendships with other members of the circle and the nature of his relationship with Eulenburg. The proceedings also involved medical experts, including Magnus Hirschfeld, whose testimony became part of the wider public debate concerning homosexuality.

The scandal expanded beyond Moltke and Eulenburg. Bernhard von Bülow also became the subject of allegations concerning his private life, while the imperial court faced increasing scrutiny over the conduct of senior officials and the emperor's associates.

Eulenburg himself faced accusations of perjury arising from statements he had made under oath denying homosexual conduct. Proceedings against him began in 1908 but were repeatedly interrupted by his ill health. The case was ultimately suspended without a final criminal conviction.

The accusations had consequences extending beyond the courtroom. Political opponents increasingly portrayed the emperor's aristocratic entourage as a secretive and morally compromised group. Press coverage associated alleged sexual misconduct with political weakness and challenged the legitimacy of informal influence at the imperial court.

Although the legal proceedings produced differing outcomes, the scandal seriously damaged Eulenburg's public standing and contributed to the end of his close relationship with Wilhelm II. Eulenburg returned to Liebenberg, where he lived increasingly isolated from his former political associates. The Liebenberg Circle gradually ceased to function as an influential social network surrounding the emperor.

== Historical significance ==
The Liebenberg Circle has attracted historical attention both as an example of informal political influence within the German Empire and as an important episode in the history of sexuality and gender relations.

The Harden–Eulenburg affair exposed tensions between aristocratic traditions of intimate male friendship, emerging concepts of homosexual identity and contemporary expectations of political masculinity. Critics of the circle argued that its supposedly effeminate members exercised an inappropriate influence over the emperor and encouraged weakness in foreign policy.

Modern historical scholarship has distinguished these contemporary accusations from the actual political role and personal relationships of the individuals concerned. In particular, the suggestion that the entire circle constituted a homosexual political conspiracy has been treated as an allegation shaped by the political and sexual prejudices of the period, rather than as an established historical fact.

Claudia Bruns argues that the scandal transformed debates about political accountability and informal influence into controversies over sexuality and gender. The public discussion focused increasingly on the alleged masculinity or femininity of the emperor's advisers rather than the constitutional structures that permitted informal political influence.

More recent scholarship has examined the circle through the history of queer social relationships. Claudia Kreklau's 2026 study analyzes the network as a distinctive aristocratic environment in which emotional intimacy, artistic performance and shared forms of identity shaped the emperor's private life and his relationships with his companions.

The affair also contributed to the public visibility of homosexuality in early twentieth-century Germany. While the proceedings brought discussions of same-sex relationships into mainstream political discourse, they also intensified discrimination and social hostility toward homosexual men. The scandal remains an important case study in the relationship between sexuality, the press, political authority and public opinion in Imperial Germany.

== See also ==
- Eulenburg affair
- Philipp, Prince of Eulenburg
- Kuno von Moltke
- Wilhelm II, German Emperor
- Paragraph 175
- LGBTQ history in Germany
