= Liebenberg Castle =

- Schloss Liebenberg
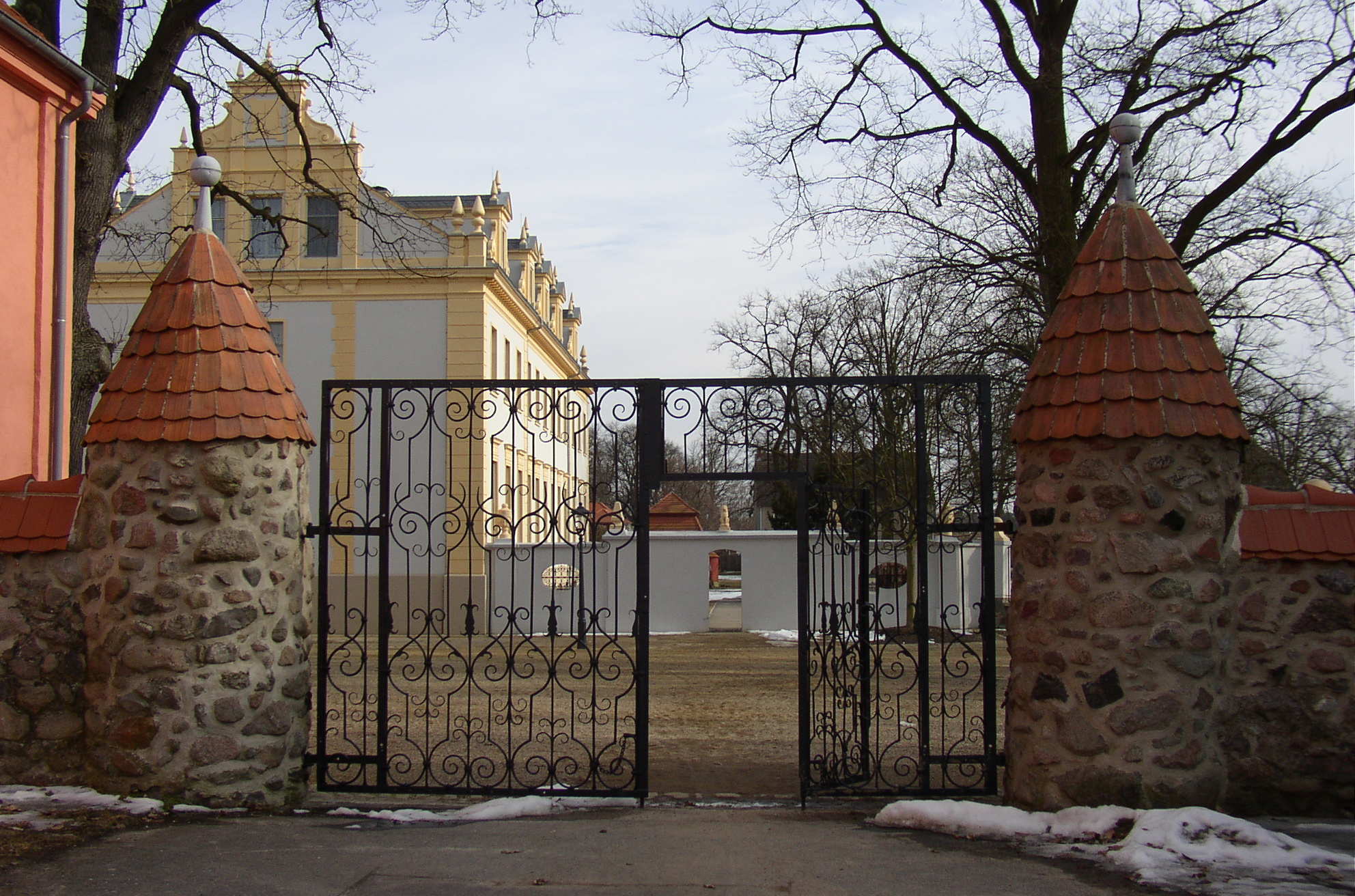
- Liebenberg Castle viewed from the park

General information
- Type: Manor house
- Architectural style: Historicism
- Location: Liebenberg, Löwenberger Land, Brandenburg, Germany
- Coordinates: 52°53′39″N 13°15′31″E
- Construction started: 1743–1747 (earlier manor house)
- Renovated: 1833–1834; 1875–1906
- Owner: DKB Stiftung für gesellschaftliches Engagement

Website
- https://www.schloss-liebenberg.de/

Liebenberg Castle is a historic manor house and former aristocratic estate in the village of Liebenberg, part of the municipality of Löwenberger Land in the Oberhavel district of Brandenburg, Germany. The estate originated as a medieval landholding and developed into a substantial country residence during the eighteenth and nineteenth centuries. The present buildings largely date from alterations and extensions carried out between 1833 and 1906.

From 1867 until 1945, Liebenberg was associated with the Eulenburg family. Its most prominent owner was Philipp, Prince of Eulenburg (1847–1921), a diplomat and close confidant of German Emperor Wilhelm II. The castle became a gathering place for the emperor and his aristocratic friends, whose informal association became known as the Liebenberg Circle. The estate subsequently became associated with the Harden–Eulenburg affair, a major political scandal of the German Empire.

During the twentieth century, the castle was connected with figures from both the Nazi regime and the German resistance. After the Second World War, it was expropriated and used by the Socialist Unity Party of Germany (SED). Following German reunification, the estate was restored and converted into a hotel, conference venue and cultural centre. Since 2005, it has belonged to the DKB Stiftung für gesellschaftliches Engagement, which manages its historic preservation and cultural activities.

== History ==
=== Medieval origins and the Bredow family ===
The settlement of Liebenberg was first documented in 1267 under the name Leveberges. During the Middle Ages, the surrounding territory belonged to the Prince-Bishopric of Brandenburg. In 1460, the bishopric sold the Löwenberg territory, including Liebenberg, to the Brandenburg noble Bredow family. During the sixteenth century, the family developed the property into a knightly estate (Rittergut).

The Thirty Years' War (1618–1648) severely affected the region. In 1652, the estate was acquired by Jobst Gerhard von und zu Hertefeld (1594–1659), a nobleman from the Duchy of Cleves who served as a senior hunting official in Brandenburg. His family subsequently developed Liebenberg into an agricultural and residential estate.

The Hertefeld family also held estates in the Lower Rhine region, including Haus Hertefeld and Haus Kolk. Liebenberg eventually became one of the family's principal Brandenburg residences.

=== Development under the Hertefeld family ===
The earliest known single-storey manor house on the site was constructed between 1743 and 1747. Archaeological evidence suggests that parts of the present complex may incorporate structural remains dating from the period of Bredow ownership, including portions of the cellar vaulting.

Following the Napoleonic Wars, Karl Adolf Freiherr von und zu Hertefeld (1794–1867) undertook substantial improvements to the property. In 1833–1834, he replaced the earlier building with a larger manor house, forming the architectural nucleus of the present castle.

The estate also became known for its gardens and landscaped grounds. During the nineteenth century, the earlier formal gardens were transformed into an English-style landscape park influenced by the designs of Peter Joseph Lenné (1789–1866), one of the leading landscape architects of Prussia.

The novelist and travel writer Theodor Fontane visited Liebenberg and described its landscape, history and aristocratic residents in Fünf Schlösser (Five Castles), the fifth volume of his Wanderungen durch die Mark Brandenburg (Walks through the March of Brandenburg), published in 1889. His account remains an important historical description of the estate and its inhabitants.

=== The Eulenburg family ===
In 1867, Karl Adolf von Hertefeld died without children, and his estates passed to his great-niece Alexandrine Freiin von Rothkirch-Panthen, who was married to Count Philipp Conrad zu Eulenburg (1820–1889). Through this inheritance, Liebenberg and several associated estates passed into the possession of the Eulenburg family.

Around 1875, Philipp Conrad zu Eulenburg enlarged the manor house with a ceremonial hall wing, a staircase tower and a terrace overlooking the park. These extensions gave the previously modest country residence the character of a representative aristocratic castle.

Following Philipp Conrad's death in 1889, his son Philipp zu Eulenburg inherited Liebenberg. He continued to expand the buildings, adding historicist architectural features, a chapel and additional wings around the courtyard. The approach to the castle was redesigned, with ornamental gates and smaller houses associated with the estate's hunting activities.

Under Philipp's ownership, Liebenberg became a notable centre of aristocratic social life in Imperial Germany. The estate's proximity to Berlin, extensive forests and secluded surroundings made it attractive for private gatherings and royal hunting parties.

=== Wilhelm II and the Liebenberg Circle ===
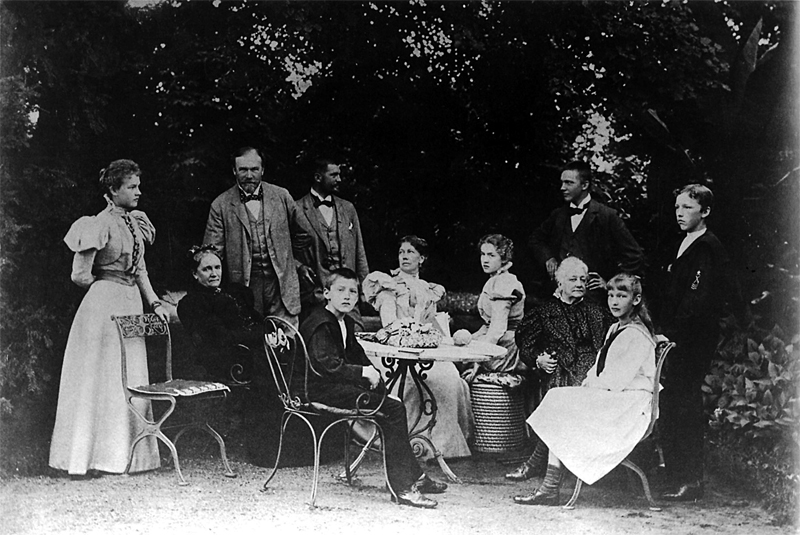
Members of the Eulenburg family at Liebenberg.

Philipp zu Eulenburg was one of the closest personal friends of Emperor Wilhelm II. The emperor frequently visited Liebenberg, where the two men and their associates participated in hunting expeditions, musical performances and private discussions.

The informal association of aristocrats, diplomats and military officers surrounding Eulenburg and the emperor became known as the Liebenberger Kreis or Liebenberger Tafelrunde (Liebenberg Circle or Liebenberg Round Table). Its members included the Prussian general Kuno von Moltke, while the circle maintained political connections with leading figures such as Bernhard von Bülow, who became Imperial Chancellor in 1900.

The Liebenberg gatherings acquired political significance because several participants had privileged personal access to Wilhelm II. The circle became associated with the emperor's system of personal government, in which informal friendships and court relationships could influence political appointments and decision-making.

In 1906–1907, the group became the target of a public campaign by journalist Maximilian Harden, who criticized the political influence of Eulenburg and his associates and published allegations concerning their private lives. The controversy developed into the Harden–Eulenburg affair, involving a series of widely publicized legal proceedings and accusations of homosexuality.

The scandal seriously damaged Eulenburg's reputation and his relationship with the imperial court. His son Friedrich Wend zu Eulenburg-Hertefeld assumed the management of the estate in 1907.

In 1908, the family constructed the Seehaus, a separate residence on the eastern shore of the Großer Lankesee, which later acquired its own historical significance.

=== Liebenberg during the Nazi period ===
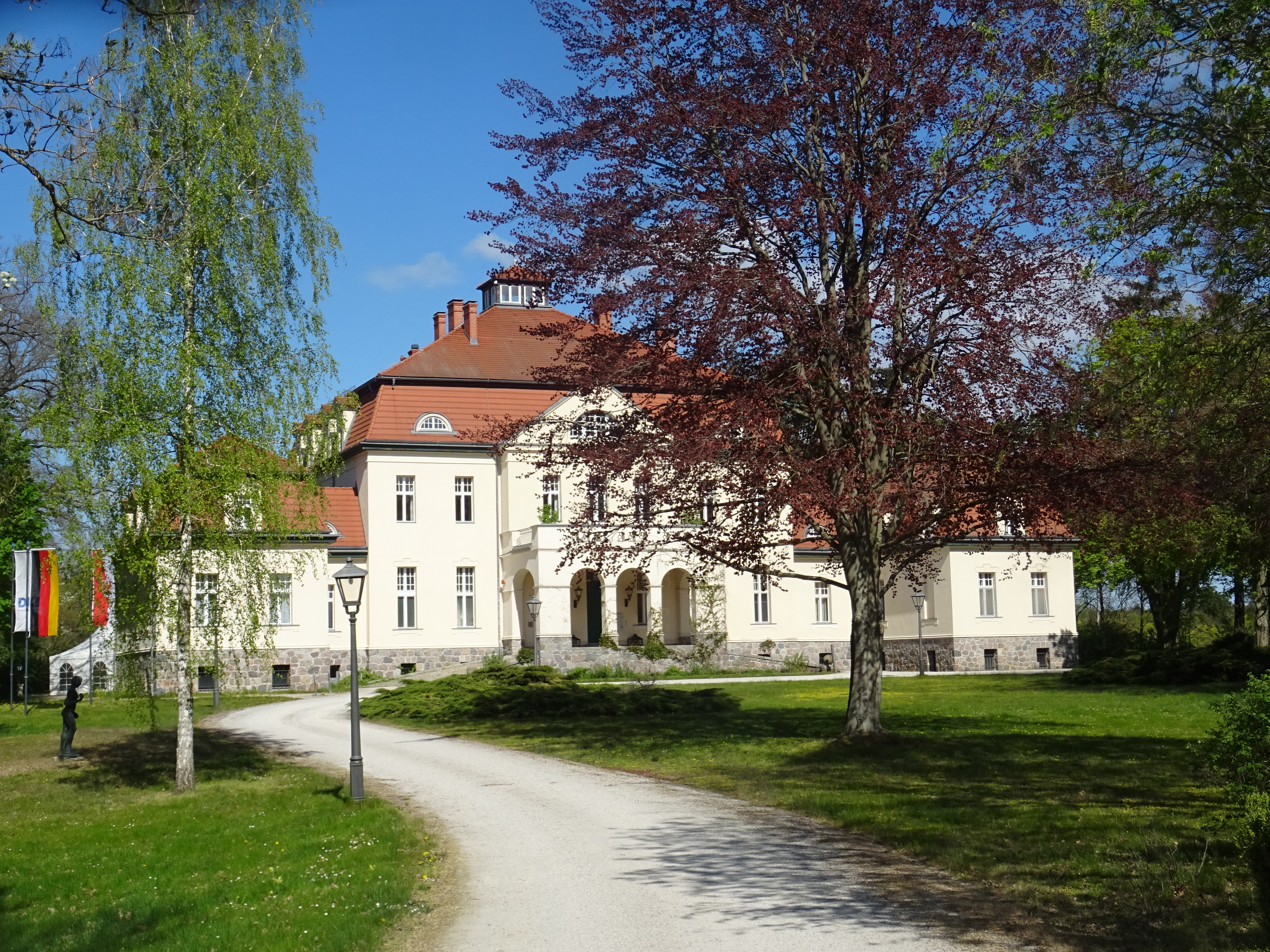
Schloss Seehaus, a lakeside residence associated with the Liebenberg estate.

Following the Nazi seizure of power in 1933, Liebenberg remained in the possession of the Eulenburg family. Friedrich Wend zu Eulenburg-Hertefeld joined the Nazi Party in 1934, according to the estate's published historical account. The property also hosted hunting visits by senior Nazi officials, including Hermann Göring.

With the outbreak of the Second World War, the agricultural estate increasingly relied on women and forced labourers, including prisoners of war, after many male workers were called up for military service.

The estate was also closely associated with Libertas Schulze-Boysen (1913–1942), a granddaughter of Philipp zu Eulenburg who had spent part of her childhood at Liebenberg. On 16 July 1936, she married Harro Schulze-Boysen (1909–1942) in the castle chapel.

Although the couple initially had sympathies with elements of National Socialism, they subsequently became involved in resistance activities. Harro and Libertas were associated with a network of opponents of the Nazi dictatorship that was later designated by the Gestapo as the Red Orchestra (Rote Kapelle). Both were arrested in 1942 and executed in Berlin on 22 December of that year.

The castle and its chapel subsequently became places of remembrance for their resistance activities. In 2017, two Stolpersteine commemorating Harro and Libertas Schulze-Boysen were installed near the entrance to the castle.

==== Otto Warburg and the Seehaus ====
An unusual episode in the estate's wartime history involved the physiologist and Nobel laureate Otto Heinrich Warburg (1883–1970).

In 1943, the Kaiser Wilhelm Society transferred Warburg's Institute for Cell Physiology from Berlin-Dahlem to the Seehaus at Liebenberg because of the increasing danger posed by Allied air raids. The property was made available by Friedrich Wend zu Eulenburg-Hertefeld.

The building initially required extensive repairs because of its deteriorated condition, including problems with the roof and the absence of functioning heating and electrical installations. Nevertheless, the researchers were able to resume scientific work after the conversion.

In May 1945, the Soviet Red Army dismantled the institute's equipment at Liebenberg, ending its wartime use as a scientific research facility.

=== End of the Second World War and expropriation ===
The final months of the Second World War brought major destruction and disruption to the estate. Parts of the castle complex were damaged by fire, while other buildings survived but subsequently suffered extensive looting.

Research published by the Museumsverband Brandenburg in 2024, based on contemporary administrative records, documented the loss and dispersal of the castle's art collections, furniture, library and archives. A police-assisted inspection conducted on 27 March 1946 found that much of the estate had been plundered and that portions of the buildings had burned. Significant parts of the family archive were lost or damaged, although some surviving records eventually reached the Brandenburg State Main Archive.

The collections formerly preserved at Liebenberg included historical portraits, sculptures, furniture, porcelain and paintings. The 1946 inventory recorded approximately 60 pieces of furniture, 25 carpets, 19 decorative objects, several paintings and a sculpture among the objects identified at the site.

Following the end of the war, the Eulenburg family left Liebenberg. The property was expropriated during the land reforms undertaken in the Soviet occupation zone of Germany.

=== German Democratic Republic ===
The castle courtyard and historic village church, which forms part of the surrounding architectural ensemble.

In 1946, the estate was assigned to the Socialist Unity Party of Germany (SED), which developed it as a party-operated agricultural enterprise. It supplied food and other agricultural products to party institutions, including the SED's Karl Marx Party Academy.

The main castle building was adapted for administrative, residential and practical purposes. Its rooms were used for offices, accommodation, storage and local services. During the decades of socialist administration, alterations and changes of use affected parts of the historic interiors.

The Seehaus became a restricted recreational residence for senior East German officials. Among its guests were prominent leaders of the German Democratic Republic, including Wilhelm Pieck, Otto Grotewohl and Walter Ulbricht. The surrounding forests were also used for official hunting activities. In 1964, the Liebenberg forest was designated a state hunting district.

During the period of Erich Honecker's leadership, the Seehaus continued to be used by party officials, although its earlier prominence declined. Access to the building and its immediate surroundings remained controlled.

Following the political upheavals of 1989, demonstrators gathered outside the previously restricted Seehaus in December of that year and demanded access. The protests formed part of the wider Peaceful Revolution that brought an end to SED rule in East Germany.

=== Reunification and restoration ===
Following German reunification in 1990, the estate passed through a period of administrative and economic restructuring. In 1991, the property came under the control of the Treuhandanstalt, the agency responsible for managing and privatizing former East German state property.

During the following decade, various attempts were made to establish sustainable commercial uses for the historic buildings and agricultural land. Around the beginning of the twenty-first century, Deutsche Kreditbank (DKB) acquired the estate and initiated redevelopment projects.

The main castle was converted into a hotel and conference venue, while the Seehaus was developed for accommodation and meetings. The former agricultural buildings were adapted to support cultural activities and visitor facilities.

In 2005, the DKB Stiftung für gesellschaftliches Engagement acquired the property. The foundation subsequently undertook restoration and conservation work intended to preserve the historic buildings and landscape while establishing long-term uses for the estate.

== Architecture and grounds ==
=== Main castle ===
Liebenberg Castle is an example of a Brandenburg manor house extensively remodelled during the nineteenth century in historicist styles.

The present building developed from a relatively simple eighteenth-century manor house. The reconstruction of 1833–1834 created a larger residence, while later nineteenth-century additions introduced ceremonial rooms, towers, terraces and architectural ornamentation.

The enlargements undertaken by the Eulenburg family transformed the property into a multi-wing complex. Its exterior combines traditional country-house proportions with decorative historicist features, including gables, projecting sections and steeply pitched roofs.

A chapel was added to the complex during the Eulenburg period. It later became historically significant as the location of the 1936 marriage of Harro and Libertas Schulze-Boysen.

=== Park and estate buildings ===
A tea pavilion in the landscaped grounds of Liebenberg Castle.

The castle is surrounded by a landscaped park developed during the nineteenth century. Its design was influenced by the work of Peter Joseph Lenné and combines open lawns, tree-lined paths and remnants of earlier formal garden arrangements.

The park includes historic ornamental buildings and garden structures, including a tea pavilion, the Lindenhaus and the Rosenburg. The nearby village church dates in part from the thirteenth century and is associated with the history of the estate and its noble families.

The wider estate also includes agricultural buildings, former stables, residential houses, hunting-related structures and other service buildings. Together, these structures illustrate the development of Liebenberg as both an aristocratic residence and a working rural estate.

=== Seehaus ===
The Seehaus, constructed in 1908 on the eastern shore of the Großer Lankesee, formed a separate lakeside residence within the estate. Its history includes use as a private country house, a wartime scientific research facility and a restricted recreational residence for East German officials.

== Heritage protection ==
The Liebenberg estate is protected as a historic architectural complex under Brandenburg's heritage legislation.

The protected ensemble comprises the main manor house, associated buildings, agricultural structures, landscaped grounds and other historic features. The Seehaus is also recognized as a protected historic property.

The estate's architectural heritage spans several centuries, including the thirteenth-century church, a historic half-timbered building dating from 1698, the eighteenth-century origins of the manor house and the substantial additions made during the nineteenth and early twentieth centuries.

Conservation work since reunification has sought to preserve this architectural diversity while adapting the complex for contemporary use.

== Present-day use ==
Today, Liebenberg Castle operates as a hotel, conference centre and cultural venue under the name Schloss & Gut Liebenberg. Its activities include accommodation, weddings, conferences, educational programmes and cultural events.

The DKB Stiftung für gesellschaftliches Engagement uses the estate as a centre for projects involving heritage conservation, education, sustainability and social inclusion. The grounds also contain museum exhibitions concerning local history, aristocratic life, agriculture and the political history of the twentieth century.

A memorial exhibition in the castle chapel commemorates Harro and Libertas Schulze-Boysen and their involvement in resistance against National Socialism. The Stolpersteine installed in 2017 further commemorate the couple.

Since 2009, the foundation has supported employment programmes for people with disabilities through its associated social enterprises, integrating heritage tourism with social and educational initiatives.

== See also ==
- Liebenberg Circle
- Philipp, Prince of Eulenburg
- Kuno von Moltke
- Eulenburg affair
- Libertas Schulze-Boysen
- Harro Schulze-Boysen
- Otto Heinrich Warburg
