= Zukunft =

Zukunft may refer to:

- Paul F. Zukunft (born 1955), former Commandant of the United States Coast Guard
- Die Zukunft (The Future), German social-democratic weekly (1892–1923) founded and edited by Maximilian Harden
