= Friedrich von Holstein =

German diplomat (1837–1909)

Holstein at the Foreign Office, 1906

Friedrich August Karl Ferdinand Julius von Holstein (24 April 1837 – 8 May 1909) was a civil servant of the German Empire and served as the head of the political department of the German Foreign Office for more than thirty years. He played a major role in shaping foreign policy after Bismarck was dismissed in 1890.

== Biography ==
Holstein was born in Schwedt, Province of Brandenburg on 24 April 1837, the son of a Prussian military officer August Friedrich Carl Ernst Leopold von Holstein (1800-1863) and Karoline von Brünnow (1791-1858). He studied jurisprudence at the Frederick William University of Berlin, from which he was graduated in 1856. Holstein joined the diplomatic service and in 1860 became an attaché at the Prussian embassy in Saint Petersburg under the authority of Otto von Bismarck and later served as a member of the legations at Rio de Janeiro, London, Washington, Florence, and Copenhagen. During his time at Washington, 1866–1867, his relationship with Alice Mason Hooper, wife of Senator Charles Sumner, was a source of speculation. It is not clear if their relationship became romantic. The married couple soon became separated. Holstein was recalled back to Berlin in the spring of 1867, around the time of the separation. It was believed that Sumner sent a letter to Bismarck informing him of Holstein's close relationship with Alice; however, there is no record of any letter in any archives and Sumner would later deny that he sent any such letter.

With the establishment of the German Empire in 1871, Holstein became secretary of the ambassador in Paris, Harry von Arnim. Von Arnim was a patroniser of the French royalists and a fierce opponent of Chancellor Bismarck, who finally enforced Arnim's discharge and conviction for breach of secrecy. Holstein returned to Berlin, where he assumed office as legation secretary in the Auswärtiges Amt in 1876, both an essential and a suspiciously eyed associate of Bismarck, who behind his back called him a "hyena". Holstein's career as an éminence grise was promoted by Bismarck's dismissal in 1890. The new chancellor, Leo von Caprivi, was ignorant of foreign affairs; and Holstein, as a repository of the Bismarckian tradition, became indispensable.

Holstein remained a bachelor all his life, regarded as a skillful though devious man. His reluctance to emerge into publicity has been ascribed to the part he had played under Bismarck in the Arnim scandal, which had made him powerful enemies; it was, however, possibly due to a shrinking from the responsibility of office. Yet the weakness of his position lay just in the fact that he was not ultimately responsible. He protested against the despatch of the Kruger telegram, but protested in vain. On the other hand, where his ideas were acceptable, he was generally able to realize them.

Thus, it was as Political Secretary to the Foreign Office that he determined policy in the 1890s. It was almost entirely due to him that Germany acquired Tsingtao (now Qingdao) and asserted German interests in China; the acquisition of Samoa was also largely his work. If the skill and pertinacity with which Holstein carried through his plans in these matters was learned in the school of Bismarck, he had not acquired Bismarck's faculty for foreseeing their ultimate consequences. This is seen by blunders made on the abandonment of the Reinsurance Treaty with Russia in 1890, his Chinese policy, and also of his part in the Moroccan crisis which led to the Algeciras Conference in 1906. The Kaiser's journey to Tangier was undertaken on his advice, as a protest against the supposed attempt at Germany's isolation. Holstein did not approve the later developments of German policy in Morocco, on the ground that the result would merely be to strengthen the Anglo-French entente. From 12 March 1906 onward he took no active part in the matter and resigned one month later.

To the last he believed that Germany's position would remain unsafe until an understanding had been arrived at with Britain, and it was this belief that determined his attitude towards the expansion of the Imperial Navy: beside this, he wrote in February 1909, all other questions were of lesser account. His views on this question were summarized in a memorandum of December 1907, of which Rath gives a résumé: Holstein objected to the programme of Admiral Alfred von Tirpitz and the Navy League on three main grounds: the ill-feeling likely to be aroused in South Germany, the inevitable dislocation of the finances through the huge additional charges involved, and the suspicion of Germany's motives in foreign countries, which would bind Britain still closer to France. As for the idea that Germany's power would be increased, he wrote in reply to a letter from Tirpitz's opponent Admiral Karl Galster, this was a simple question of arithmetic: for how would the sea-power of Germany be relatively increased if for every new German ship Britain built two?

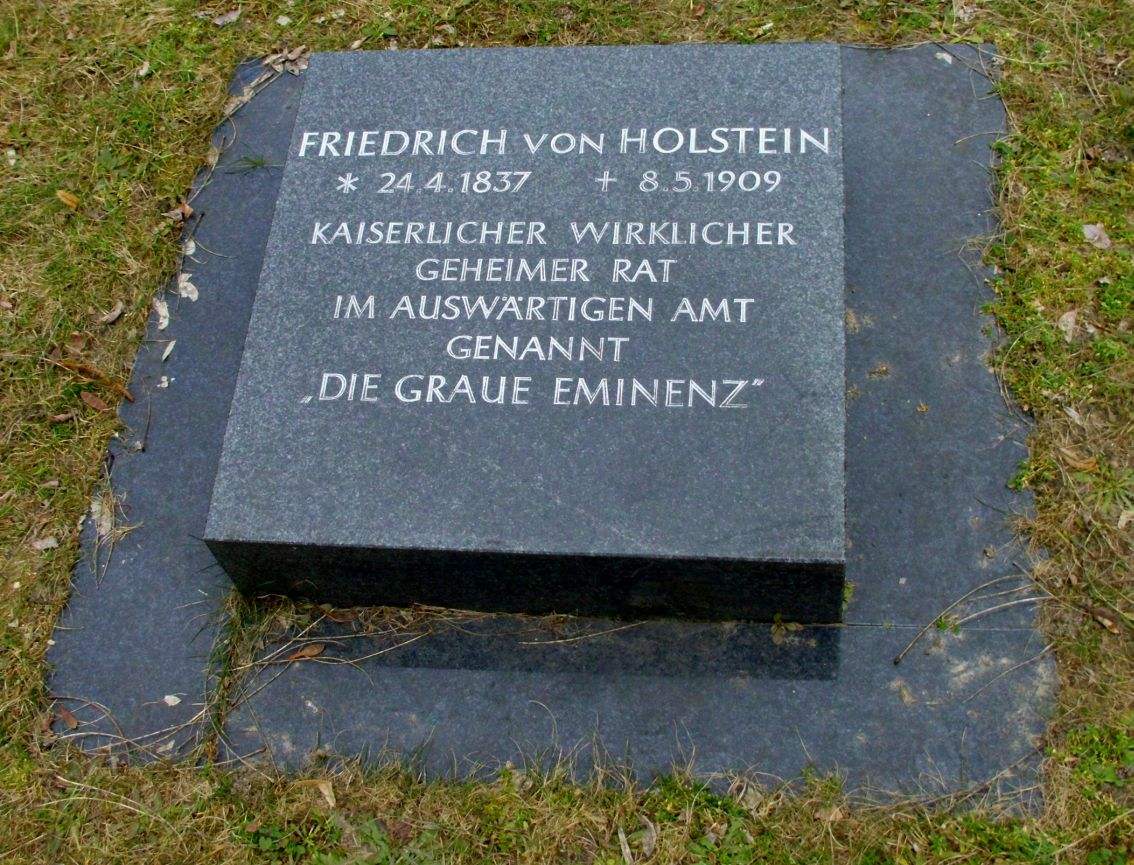
Grave of Friedrich von Holstein on the Invalidenfriedhof Berlin

Holstein died on 8 May 1909 in Berlin and his body was buried in the Invalidenfriedhof Cemetery. His assets included extensive secret dossiers concerning German statesmen that were not published until 1956. Rumours that he may have been an informant of journalist Maximilian Harden in the Harden-Eulenburg Affair have never been conclusively established.

=== Relationship with Eulenburg ===
Holstein was a conservative who in no way wanted to change the existing system, but he also believed that Germany should be a Rechtsstaat ("law state") that should function according to the laws laid down, and not according to the imperial whim. Holstein wrote in December 1894 in a letter to Eulenburg that Germany was now faced with a choice between a "système de Louis XIV" and the coming 20th century. Holstein wrote that thanks to advisors like Eulenburg, Wilhelm was behaving like an absolute monarch who at the current rate would be "far more of an autocrat" than the Russian emperor, and that if things continued on their current course Germany would to have become either a dictatorship or a republic because the current system was "an operetta government, but not one that a European people at the end of the nineteenth century will put up with". Holstein wrote he wanted "a moderate use of a practicable system of constitutional co-operative government, which with the exceptions of St. Petersburg and Constantinople, is in operation in the rest of the European and civilised world". Holstein accused Eulenburg of believing "instinctively...to an autocratic regime no matter whether it be Russian patriarchal or despotisme éclairé on the French model" and that "every political, military and legal question is best decided directly by the Kaiser". Holstein ended his letter with the warning: "See to it that world history does not some day picture you as the evil spirit who was at the side of the imperial traveler when he chose the false path". In response, Eulenburg wrote to Holstein a mystical letter saying: "I am convinced that the Guiding Hand of Providence lies behind this elemental and natural drive of the Kaiser's to direct the affairs of the Kingdom in person. Whether it will ruin us or save us I cannot say. But I find it difficult to believe in the decline of Prussia's star".

== In popular culture ==
Friedrich von Holstein was portrayed by actor Frederick Jaeger in the 1974 TV series Fall of Eagles.

== Honours ==
- Commander of the Imperial Austrian Order of Franz Joseph, with Star, 1878

== Bibliography ==
- Donald, David Herbert (1970). Charles Sumner and the Rights of Man.
- Joachim von Kürenberg, His Excellency the Spectre: The Life of Fritz von Holstein (Constable & Co., 1933)
- Robert K. Massie, Dreadnought: Britain, Germany, and the Coming of the Great War (Random House, 1991). He is the subject of Chapter 6, "The Monster of the Labyrinth."
- Rich, Norman (1965a). Friedrich von Holstein, Politics and Diplomacy in the Era of Bismarck and Wilhelm II. Vol. 1. Cambridge University Press.
- Rich, Norman (1965b). Friedrich von Holstein, Politics and Diplomacy in the Era of Bismarck and Wilhelm II. Vol. 2. Cambridge University Press.
- T. G. Otte, "Great Britain, Germany, and the Far-Eastern Crisis of 1897-8," English Historical Review (1995) 110#439 pp. 1157–1179 in JSTOR

=== Primary sources ===
- The Holstein Papers. Vol. I. Memoirs and Political Observations, edited by Norman Rich and M. H. Fisher (Cambridge Univ. Press, 1955); The Holstein Papers. Vol. 3 (1961)
  - Volume 2: Diaries vol 2 Diaries online
  - Review by J. C. G. Röhl, "Review: Friedrich von Holstein," Historical Journal, Sept 1966, Vol. 9 Issue 3, pp 379–388 online
