= Bundesrat (German Empire) =

German Empire's highest legislative body

Bundesrat Deutscher Bundesrat
- Legislative body of Germany

History
- Established: 1871
- Disbanded: 1918
- Preceded by: Bundesrat of the North German Confederation
- Succeeded by: Reichsrat of the Weimar Republic
- Seats: 61 (at dissolution)

Elections
- Voting system: Appointed

Meeting place
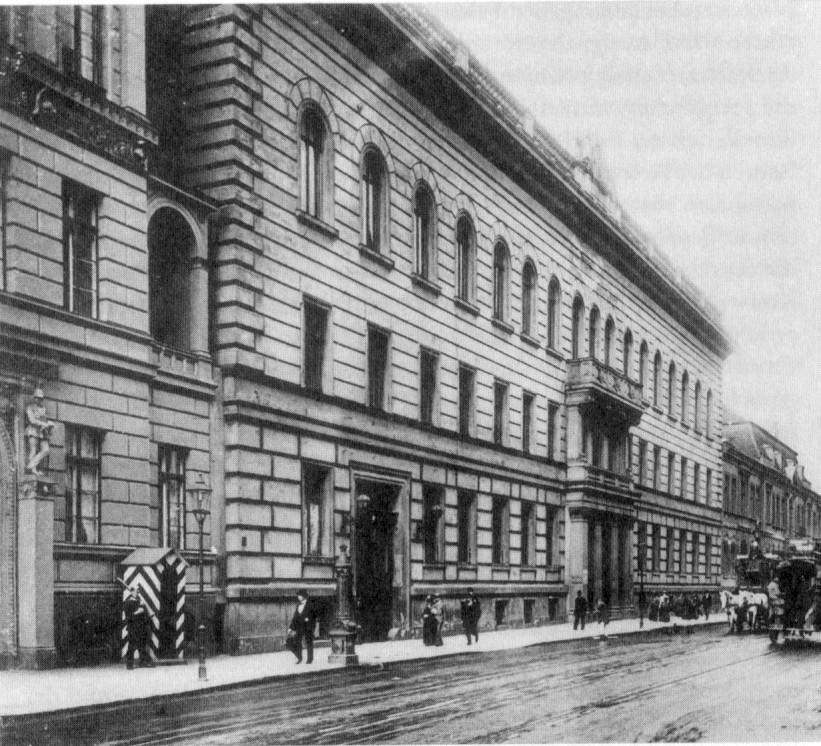
- Leipziger Straße 4, Berlin (1871–1894)

Constitution
- Constitution of the German Empire

The Bundesrat (German for 'Federal Council') was the highest legislative body in the German Empire (1871–1918). Its members were appointed by the governments of Germany's constituent states to represent their interests in the German parliament. The Reichstag was the popularly elected parliament. The Constitution of the German Empire required that both the Bundesrat and the Reichstag approve laws before they came into force. The Bundesrat was responsible for the enactment of the laws, administrative regulations and the judicial resolution of disputes between constituent states. Its approval was required for declarations of war and, with certain limitations, the conclusion of state treaties.

The chairman of the Bundesrat was the chancellor, who was appointed by the emperor. Constitutionally, his only functions were to chair the Bundesrat's meetings and implement its resolutions. He had neither a seat nor a vote in the chamber and could not propose legislation. In practice, however, the chancellor was almost always the minister president of Prussia as well. As Prussian minister president, the chancellor could act as a member of the Bundesrat and introduce legislation.

The predecessor of the German Empire, the North German Confederation (1867–1870), had a Bundesrat that was carried over to the newly united Germany with little change. Emperor Wilhelm I (r. 1871–1888) wished to rename the Bundesrat to the "Reichsrat", but his chancellor, Otto von Bismarck, convinced him that the federal character of the Empire should continue to be emphasized. The name therefore remained "Bundesrat".

== Powers ==
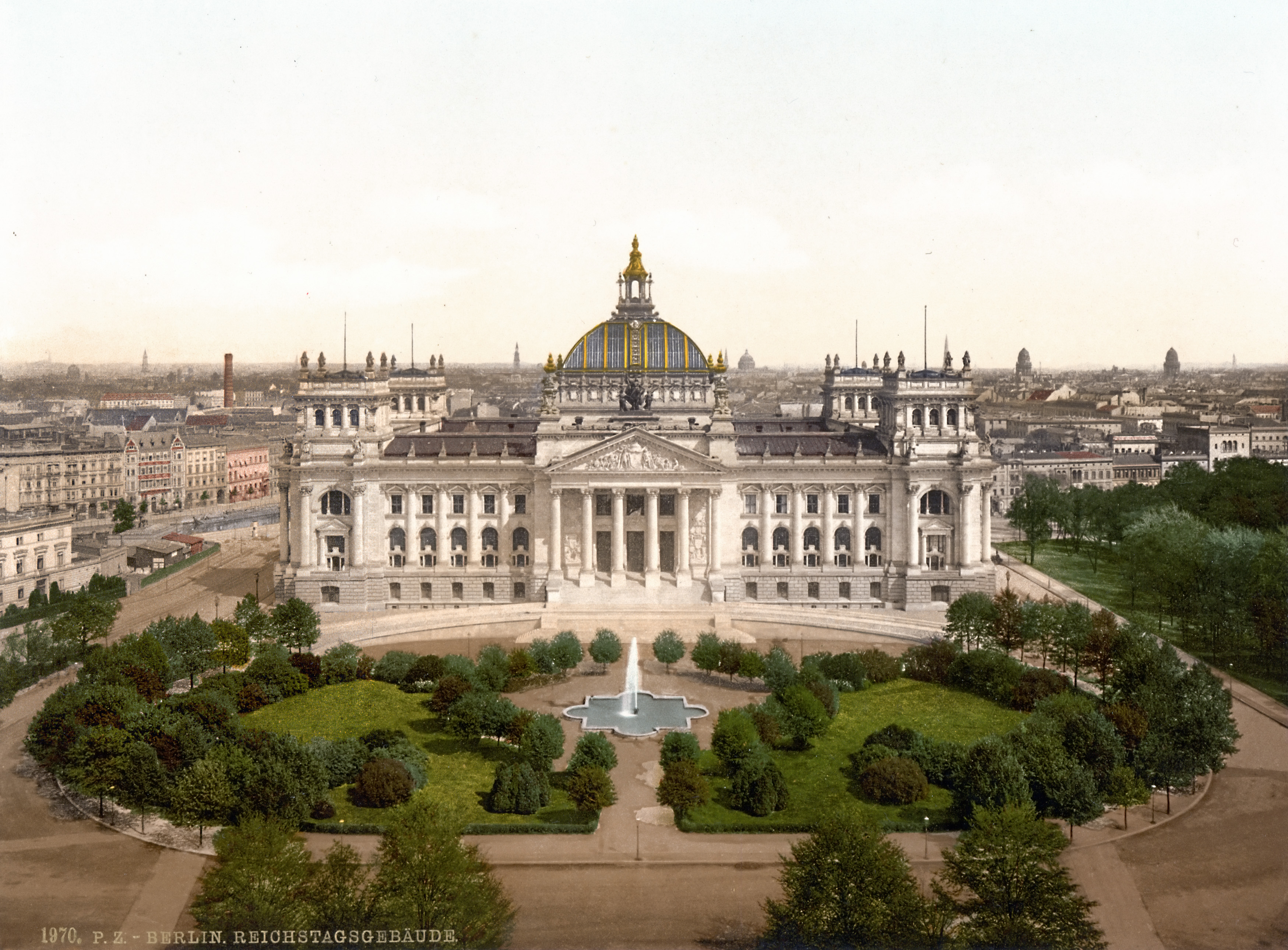
The Reichsrat's new building as of 1894

The emperor summoned and closed the Bundesrat. It had to be summoned once each year or whenever one-third of the Bundesrat's members requested it. It could be in session when the Reichstag was not, but the Reichstag could not convene without the Bundesrat also being in session (Art. 12).

The Bundesrat combined legislative and executive powers in accordance with the constitution and imperial laws. It was thus a constitutional hybrid that was also entrusted with limited judicial powers. Its legislative and executive functions were:

- participation on an equal footing with the Reichstag in legislation (Art. 5)
- participation in declarations of war and, with certain limitations, the conclusion of state treaties (Art. 11)
- deciding with the emperor on the dissolution of the Reichstag (Art. 24)
- enactment of legal ordinances and general administrative regulations (Art. 7)
- determination of deficiencies within the framework of federal oversight (Art. 7)
- decision on the initiation of a Reichsexecution, by which the emperor could force a member state that did not fulfil its duties to the Empire to do so (Art. 19)

The Bundesrat had no specifically enumerated military competence under the imperial constitution.

The constitution of the German Empire did not provide for a constitutional court. Bismarck's solution was similar to that of the German Confederation (1848–1866) in that the constitution he drafted assigned certain quasi-judicial tasks to the Bundesrat:

- resolution of disputes between constituent states that were not of a private legal nature (Art. 76)
- settlement of constitutional disputes within the constituent states (Art. 76)
- judicial assistance in the event of denial of justice in a constituent state (Art. 77)

After Alsace–Lorraine was given more autonomy in 1877, its Territorial Committee (Landesausschuss) made the laws for the formerly French region. The Bundesrat had to approve the laws before they were formally enacted by the emperor.

== Mode of operation ==
=== Representatives and votes ===
Federal state	Number of votes
Kingdom of Prussia (Note: Included the Duchy of Saxe-Lauenburg, ruled in personal union until annexed 1 July 1876)	17
Kingdom of Bavaria	6
Kingdom of Saxony	4
Kingdom of Württemberg	4
Grand Duchy of Baden	3
Grand Duchy of Hesse	3
Alsace–Lorraine (Note: Represented from 1911 although not a federal state)	3
Grand Duchy of Mecklenburg-Schwerin	2
Duchy of Brunswick	2
Grand Duchy of Mecklenburg-Strelitz	1
Grand Duchy of Oldenburg	1
Grand Duchy of Saxe-Weimar-Eisenach	1
Duchy of Anhalt	1
Duchy of Saxe-Altenburg	1
Duchy of Saxe-Coburg and Gotha	1
Duchy of Saxe-Meiningen	1
Principality of Lippe	1
Principality of Reuss-Gera	1
Principality of Reuss-Greiz	1
Principality of Schaumburg-Lippe	1
Principality of Schwarzburg-Rudolstadt	1
Principality of Schwarzburg-Sondershausen	1
Principality of Waldeck-Pyrmont	1
Free Hanseatic City of Bremen	1
Free and Hanseatic City of Hamburg	1
Free and Hanseatic City of Lübeck	1
Total	61 (until 1911: 58)
Notes:

Each member state had at least one vote and could submit proposals to the Bundesrat. If the state had more than one vote, they had to be cast uniformly since it was the constituent state that voted, not an individual authorized representative voting as he wished. A simple majority of the votes cast (not of all possible votes) was required for a motion to pass. In the event of a tie, the presidential vote, which belonged to the chancellor (Art. 15), was decisive (Art. 7).

A representative could be a state minister, but it was not required. Bismarck wanted to have state ministers in the Bundesrat in order to enhance its position, but many constituent states appointed civil servants or their state envoys in Berlin (constituent states were still allowed to have their own foreign missions, including within the Empire). Prussia increasingly appointed not only its state ministers but also state secretaries of federal departments (who were equivalent to ministers) as its representatives in the Bundesrat.

A Bundesrat representative was not allowed to be a member of the Reichstag (Art. 9, para. 2). The prohibition was considered an obstacle to the parliamentarization of the executive. When politicians from the Reichstag first became state secretaries in 1917/18, they retained their Reichstag mandates and were not appointed as Bundesrat representatives of Prussia or any other constituent state. That left them further away from power than their colleagues who were members of the Bundesrat. Under the short-lived October reforms of 1918, members of the Bundesrat could still not be in the Reichstag, but state secretaries were given the right to speak in the Reichstag even if they were not members of the Bundesrat.

=== Distribution of votes among the states ===
The number of votes for the constituent states was specified in the federal constitution (Art. 6). In 1911 the Imperial Territory of Alsace–Lorraine was granted three votes in the Bundesrat even though it never became a federal state. The addition brought the number of Bundesrat votes to its final total of 61. The number of Prussian votes remained unchanged at 17 throughout the Bundesrat's history. In terms of percentage, its share fell from 40% in the North German Confederation to just under 28% in 1911. By way of comparison, the Weimar Constitution of 1919 limited the share of Prussian votes in the Reichsrat to a maximum of 40% (the clausula antiborussica, or anti-Prussian clause). In both the Empire and the Weimar Republic, about two-thirds of all Germans lived in Prussia. Prussia's 17 votes nevertheless were sufficient to block all constitutional amendments. Only fourteen negative votes were required to do so (Art. 78).

=== Committees ===
The representatives deliberated partly in full session and partly in committees. Some of the committees were defined in the Rules of Procedure and some in the constitution (Art. 8). When Bavaria joined the Federation in 1870, it negotiated the chairmanship of the Foreign Affairs Committee for itself, although it did not result in Bavaria gaining any particular political weight. Prussia chaired the other committees.

The permanent (constitutionally defined) Bundesrat committees were: Land Army and Fortresses; Naval Affairs; Customs and Taxation; Trade and Transport; Railways, Mail and Telegraphs; the Judiciary; Accounts; and Foreign Affairs.

== The chancellor and the Bundesrat ==
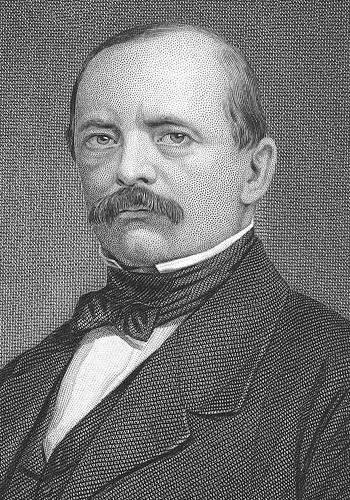
Otto von Bismarck in 1873. He was German chancellor from 1871 to 1890.

The chancellor's powers were rather meagre under the constitution. Unlike in many other countries, he had no right to speak in parliament (the Reichstag), could not submit bills to it, had no veto power over laws and could not dissolve the Reichstag. As minister president of Prussia, however, the chancellor was a member of the Bundesrat and had both the right to speak in the Reichstag and to control the 17 Prussian votes in the Bundesrat. Although only a member state was allowed to submit proposals to the Bundesrat, in practice it was often the chancellor who did so.

The constitutional power of the Bundesrat was of considerable benefit to the chancellor and was the reason he treated his Bundesrat colleagues obligingly. They in turn helped the Bundesrat to present a united front to the outside world. They never used their right to speak in the Reichstag to voice an opinion that dissented from the chancellor's.

In spite of the Bundesrat's considerable powers, the general public showed little interest in it. Experts held it in high esteem, but it was neither particularly criticized nor did the public have any special affection for it, due in large part to the fact that it did not meet in public. Precisely because the Bundesrat was an important instrument for Bismarck and emphasized the Empire's federalism, he wanted to enhance its position. He thought of making the meetings public, but it is doubtful whether the move would have changed the fact that the people were more interested in the unitary (one-state) bodies such as the emperor and the Reichstag.

== First World War ==
On 4 August 1914, shortly after the outbreak of the First World War, the Reichstag unanimously passed a series of laws, among which was the War Enabling Act, in full the "Law on the Authorization of the Bundesrat to Take Economic Measures and on the Extension of the Time Limits of the Law on Bills of Exchange and Cheques in the Case of Warlike Events". With the War Enabling Act, the Reichstag partially transferred its legislative co-determination rights to the Bundesrat.

The Act was a breach of the constitution and controversial in constitutional law. Although the term "economic measures" was elastic, the Bundesrat made rather moderate use of the War Enabling Act. It had to submit the emergency decrees drafted under the law to the Reichstag, which in turn rarely objected. Both state bodies shied away from open conflict.

In the early days of the German Revolution of 1918–1919, on 10 November 1918, Friedrich Ebert, the chairman of the Council of the People's Deputies, which then exercised the rights of both the emperor and the chancellor, said that the Reichstag should not be reconvened but that there was no decision yet on its dissolution. According to the constitution, a resolution of the Bundesrat would have been necessary to dissolve the Reichstag. In light of the ongoing revolution, the Council saw no place for the Bundesrat as a combined executive and legislative body. Ebert did not want to simply dissolve the Bundesrat out of fear of making enemies of the (by then also revolutionary) state governments. On 14 November the Council issued a decree according to which the Bundesrat would continue to exercise its administrative powers, indicating implicitly that the remaining powers were no longer in effect.

The new Reichsrat of the Weimar Republic convened on 14 August 1919, the date on which the Weimar Constitution became effective.
