= Die Zukunft =

Die Zukunft ("The Future") has been the name of three newspapers.

Die Zukunft was a German social-democratic weekly (1892–1923) founded and edited by Maximilian Harden. It published allegations of homosexuality against Philipp, Prince of Eulenburg, leading to the Eulenburg affair in Wilhelmine Germany.

Die Zukunft was also the name of an exile German language paper, both anti-Nazi and anti-Stalinist in its politics, which was founded in 1938, and was based in Paris and edited by Arthur Koestler and Willi Münzenberg. Olof Aschberg provided the funds for launching this weekly political broadsheet. It ceased publication with the Nazi occupation of France in 1940.

Die Zukunft is also a Yiddish magazine published in the United States. Founded in New York in 1892, as an organ of the Socialist Labor Party, Die Zukunft was one of the first serious Yiddish periodicals to be published anywhere and the oldest still appearing at the turn of the 21st century. Die Zukunft, for many years a publication of the New York-based Congress for Jewish Culture, continues to appear, albeit approximately twice a year, publishing poetry, literary reviews and essays in Yiddish.
