= Eulenburg affair =

1907–1909 German government homosexuality scandal

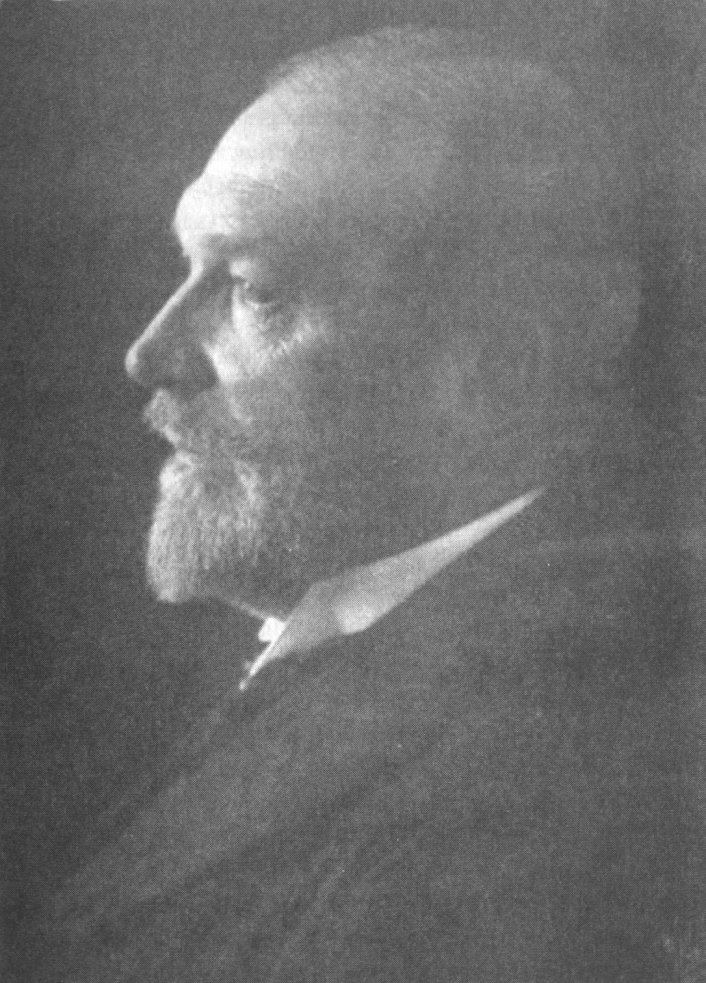
Philipp, Prince of Eulenburg (1905)

The Eulenburg affair (Note: German: Eulenburg-Affäre) (also called the Harden–Eulenburg affair (Note: German: Harden-Eulenburg-Affäre)) was a public controversy surrounding a series of courts-martial and five civil trials regarding accusations of homosexual conduct, and accompanying libel trials, among prominent members of German Emperor Wilhelm II's cabinet and entourage during 1907–1909.

The issue centred on journalist Maximilian Harden's accusations of homosexual conduct between the Kaiser's close friend Philipp, Prince of Eulenburg, and General Kuno von Moltke. Accusations and counter-accusations quickly multiplied, and the phrase "Liebenberg Round Table" came to be used for the homosexual circle around the Kaiser.

The Eulenburg affair has been held up as one example of anti-homosexuality sentiment being used as a means to attain certain political goals. As Eulenburg's wife later commented, "They are striking at my husband, but their target is the Kaiser."

The affair received wide publicity and is often considered the biggest domestic scandal of Imperial Germany. It has been described as "the biggest homosexual scandal ever." It led to one of the first major public discussions of homosexuality in Germany, comparable to the trial of Oscar Wilde in England. Historians have linked the aftermath of the affair to the changes in German foreign policy that heightened its military aggression and ultimately contributed to World War I.

== Causes ==
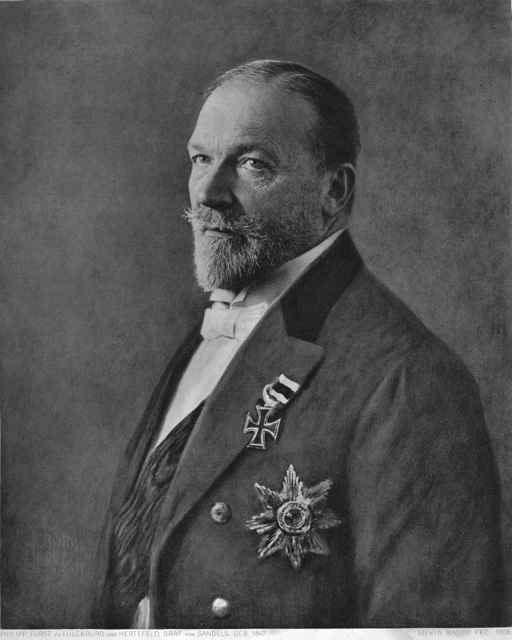
Philipp, Prince of Eulenburg (1906)

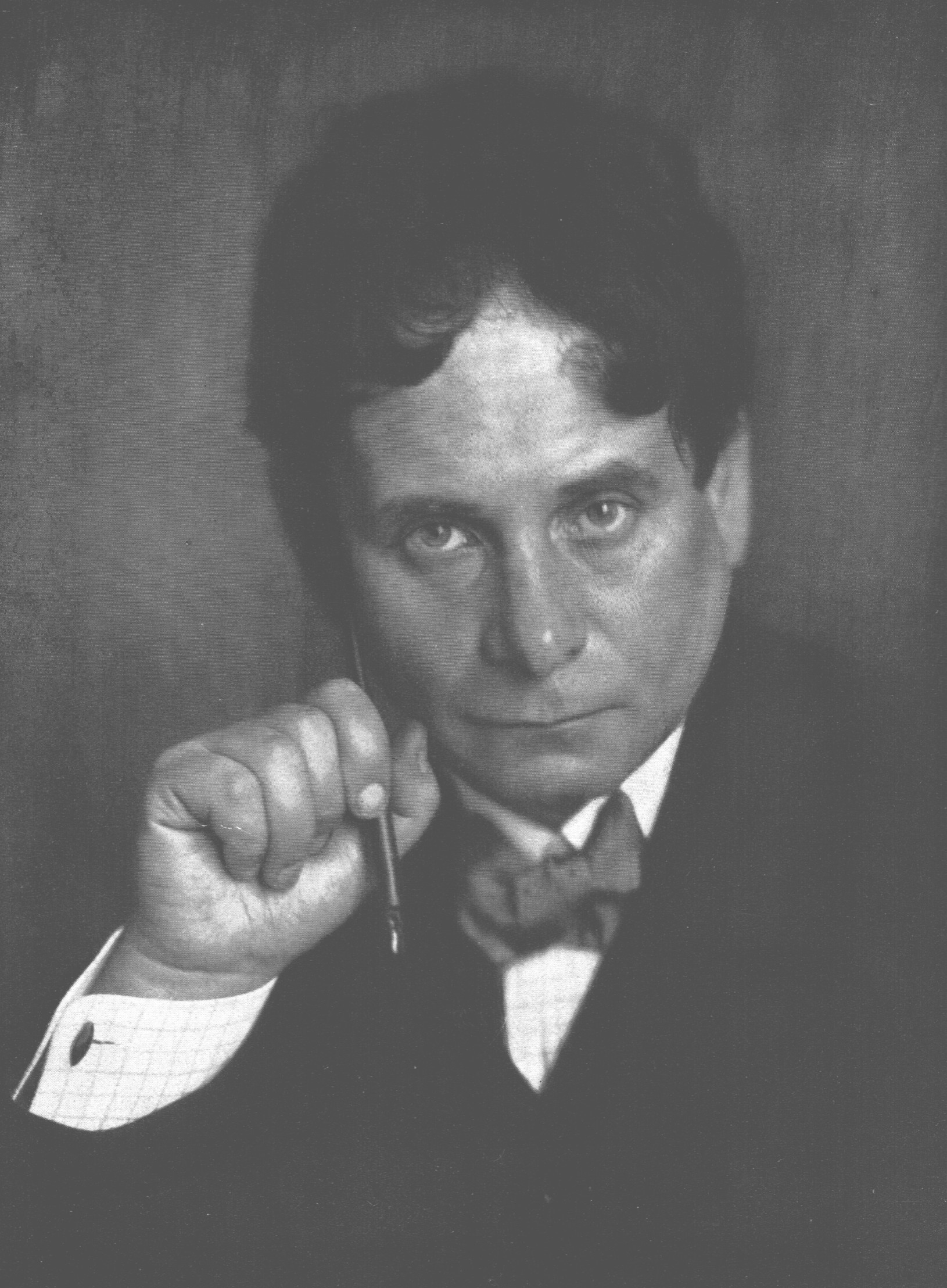
Maximilian Harden

The scandal was used by opponents of Germany's foreign policies. Wilhelm II dismissed "Iron" Chancellor Otto von Bismarck and his Realpolitik system of treaties and agreements in 1890, replacing Bismarck's clear rule with a muddle and his foreign policies with a confrontational, expansionist Weltpolitik. The anti-imperialist Eulenburg became the most prominent member of Wilhelm II's entourage, having been promoted from a member of the diplomatic corps to an ambassador. Like many others, Bismarck noticed that the nature of the relationship between Wilhelm II and Eulenburg could "not be confided to paper" and felt, alongside those others, that even these activities in the private sphere were not to be exposed to the public. Beyond that, the Auswärtiges Amt suffered what the British historian John C. G. Röhl called a "culture of intrigue" with German diplomats forever forming factions to plot against one another. The two dominant factions in the early 20th century were the faction headed by Friedrich von Holstein, the powerful director of the Political Department at the Auswärtiges Amt, and the Bülow–Eulenburg clique, headed by Bernhard von Bülow and his close friend Eulenburg, which was rapidly eclipsing the Holstein faction. Holstein had known Eulenburg since June 1886 and had once been his ally when the two had plotted against Bismarck in 1889–1890, but starting around 1894, Eulenburg and Holstein had begun to come into conflict with each other. The close friendship between Eulenburg and the Kaiser meant that Holstein tended to lose his disputes with Eulenburg. As a trump card to destroy his rival Eulenburg, Holstein had contacted Maximilian Harden to inform him that Eulenburg was a homosexual.

Harden, imperialist head of the periodical Die Zukunft, felt similarly about the direction of German foreign policy, and in 1902 personally threatened to expose Eulenburg unless he retired from his ambassadorship in Vienna; Eulenburg did so, withdrawing from public life until 1906. Harden reaffirmed his threat after Germany at the Algeciras Conference of 1906 recognized Morocco as being within the French sphere of influence, in what was for Germany a major foreign policy fiasco, and Eulenburg responded by moving to Switzerland. In May 1906, Holstein sent Eulenburg an extremely insulting and rude letter alongside a challenge to fight a duel to the death. After Eulenburg declined to fight the duel, Holstein decided to destroy Eulenburg by exposing his homosexuality.

Between 1906 and 1907, six military officers committed suicide after blackmail, while in the preceding three years, around twenty officers were convicted by courts-martial, all for homosexual acts. A Gardes du Corps officer was charged with homosexuality, an embarrassment because the elite Corps was commanded by Lieutenant General Wilhelm Graf von Hohenau, a blood relative to the Kaiser. Worse than these sexual scandals, in Harden's eyes, was Eulenburg's decision to return to Germany and be admitted to the Order of the Black Eagle; he did not change his mind when Prince Friedrich Heinrich of Prussia declined to be admitted to the Order of Saint John because of his own homosexual proclivities.

== Outing ==
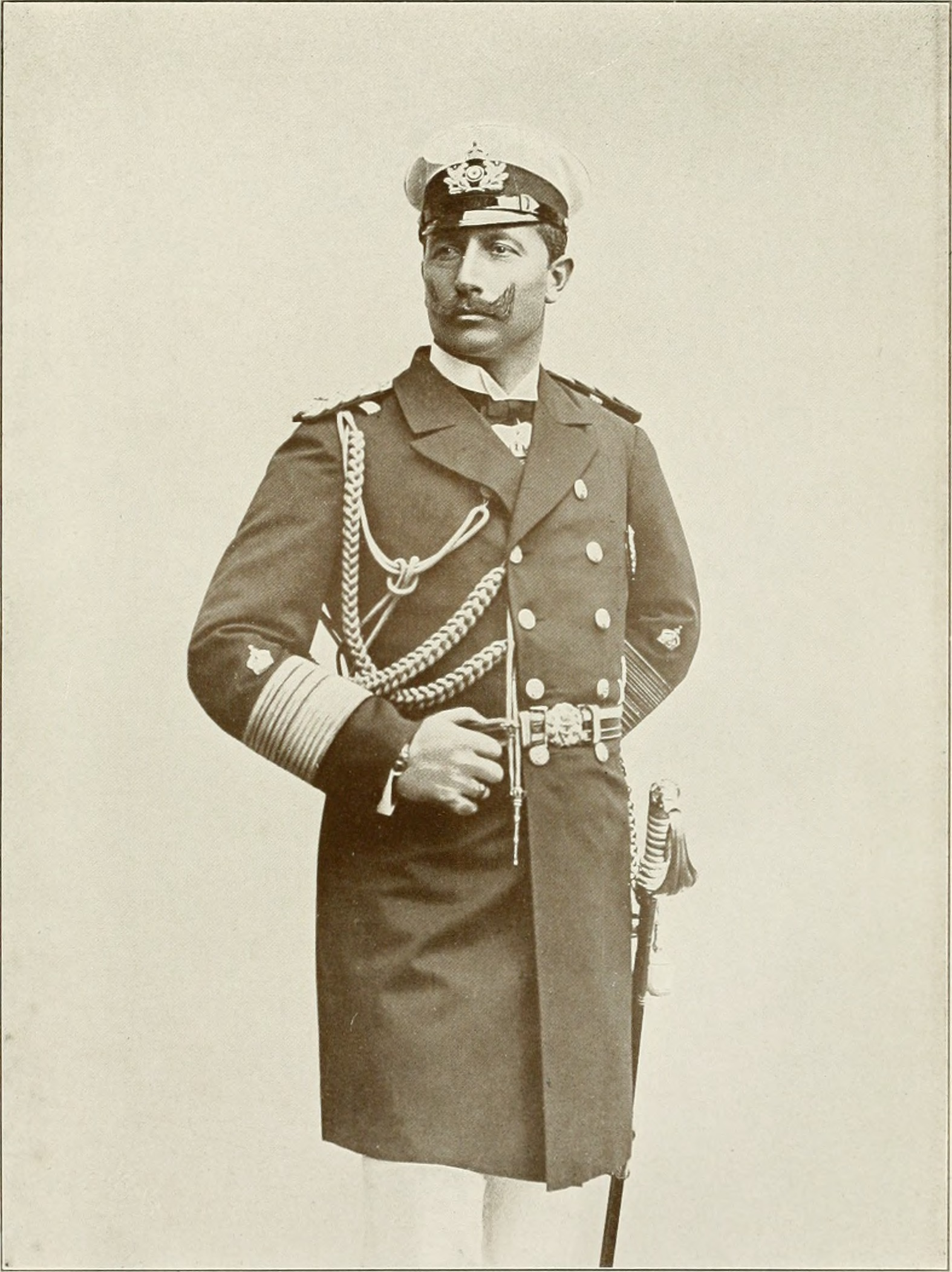
Wilhelm II of Germany (1908)

Harden outed Eulenburg on April 27, 1907, confirming the identity he previously had parodied as "the Harpist" (Eulenburg), after outing "Sweetie" General Kuno Graf von Moltke in 1906. Wilhelm II, informed of the growing story, responded by requiring the resignation of three of fifteen prominent aristocrats, Hohenau, Moltke, and Count Johannes von Lynar, listed as homosexual by the Berlin vice squad; however, the actual list, not shown to Wilhelm II, contained several hundred names.

Moltke's lawyer attempted to file criminal libel against Harden, but was dismissed and civil libel was suggested. Eulenburg denied any culpability and presented a self-accusation of violating the applicable Paragraph 175 to his district attorney who, as hoped and expected, cleared Eulenburg of all charges in July. Meanwhile, manager of the Königliche Oper Georg von Hülsen, the crown prince's equerry von Stückradt, and Imperial Chancellor Bernhard Prince von Bülow were accused of having homosexual tendencies or engaging in homosexual activities.

== The main trials ==
=== Moltke v. Harden ===
This trial was held from October 23 to 29, 1907.

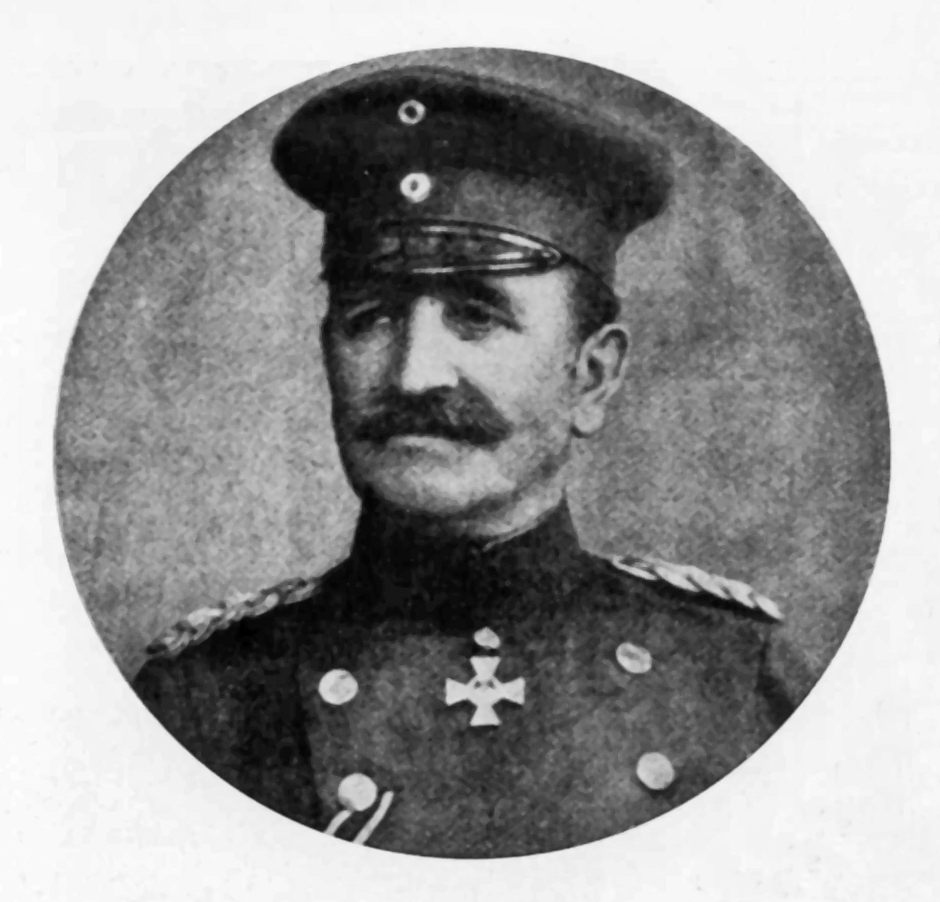
General Kuno Graf von Moltke

Testifying against Moltke were Lilly von Elbe, his former wife of nine years, a soldier named Bollhardt, and Dr. Magnus Hirschfeld. Elbe described the lack of conjugal relations, happening only on the first and second night of their marriage, Moltke's overly close friendship with Eulenburg with whom he was always spending too much time, and her ignorance of homosexuality. Elbe's testimony was sensational for the time and attracted much media attention as she spoke openly of her sexual needs and how difficult it was for her to be married to a man like Moltke who had no sexual interest in her, causing her to attack him several times in desperation. At the time, Germany had a very conservative culture where the existence of female sexuality was never spoken of in public, and Elbe's testimony was noteworthy for the first time where the subject of female sexuality was addressed in Germany. The revelation that his young wife had attacked General von Moltke without his defending himself was seen at the time as confirming that Moltke was not manly, as the expectation was that a Prussian officer and a "real man" would have beaten his wife if she struck him, which in turn confirmed the belief that Moltke was homosexual. Moltke's lawyers counterattacked using the subject of Elbe's sexuality, arguing that any woman who spoke openly of her sexuality was a deranged "hysterical nymphomaniac" who could not be trusted. Bollhardt described attending champagne-filled parties at Lynar's villa at which he saw both Hohenau and Moltke. Hirschfeld, a prominent German sexologist who was himself homosexual, had observed the trial and testified that Moltke most certainly had a feminine side and was homosexual even if he had never committed sodomy. On October 29, the court found Moltke homosexual and Harden innocent of libel.

However, the trial was voided on procedural grounds, and the state prosecutor decided to allow a criminal libel trial.

=== Bülow v. Brand ===
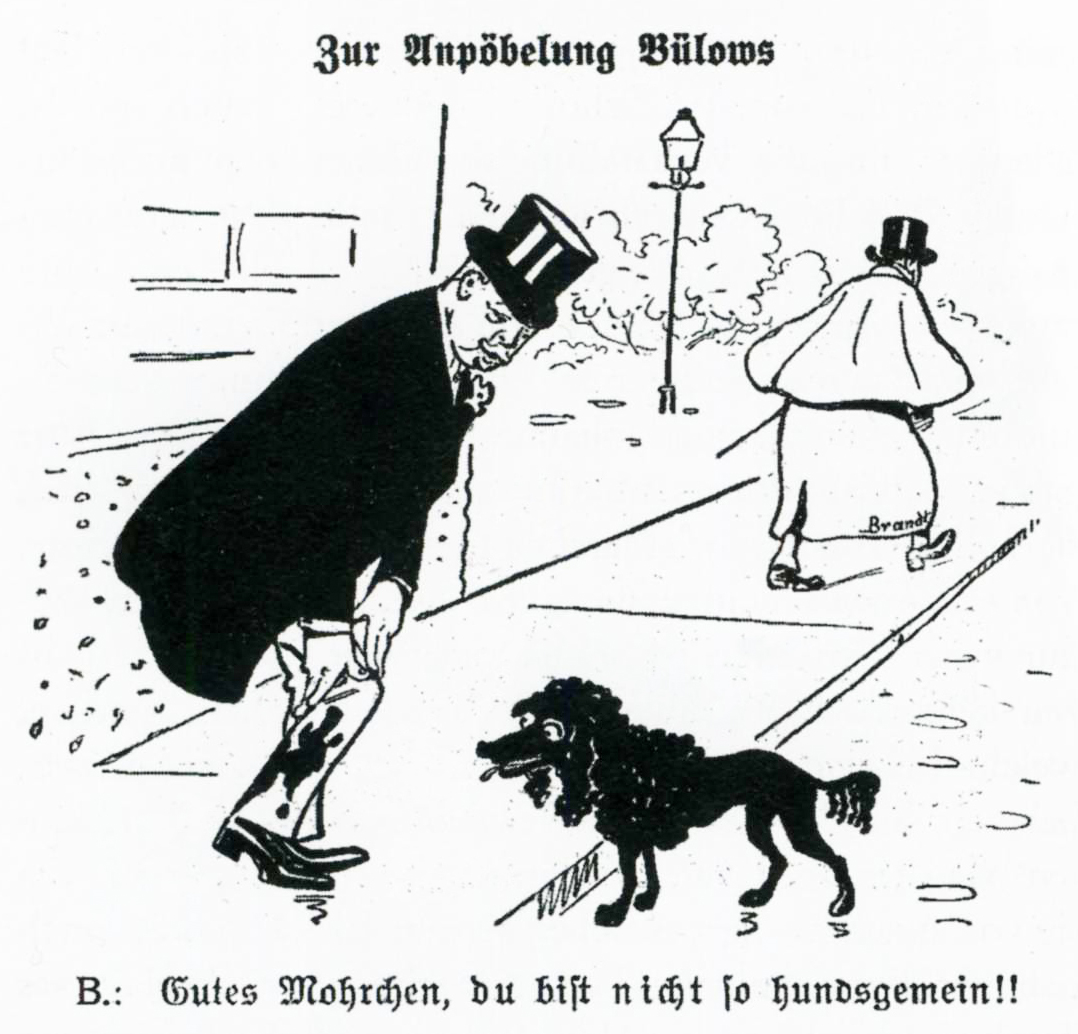
Cartoon satirising Bülow published October 1907 in Kladderadatsch. Title "On the maligning of Bülow", caption "Good Mohrchen, you would never be such a bad dog!"

November 6, 1907.
Adolf Brand, founder of the first homosexual periodical, Der Eigene (The Unique), had printed a pamphlet which described how Bülow had been blackmailed for his sexuality and had kissed and embraced his private secretary Max Scheefer at male gatherings hosted by Eulenburg, and thus was morally obliged to publicly oppose Paragraph 175. Brand was found guilty of libel and sentenced to 18 months in prison.

=== Harden v. Moltke ===
December 18–25, 1907.
Elbe, through a diagnosis of classical hysteria, and Hirschfeld, by retracting his earlier testimony, were discredited and Harden was convicted of libel and sentenced to four months imprisonment.

=== Harden v. Städele ===
April 21, 1908.
Now motivated by political goals, morals, and vengeance, Harden set out to prove Eulenburg's homosexuality by persuading Anton Städele to publish an article claiming Harden took hush money from Eulenburg. Harden then sued his accomplice for libel, Städele was found guilty and charged a hundred mark fine, repaid by Harden. During the trial, however, Georg Riedel and Jacob Ernst testified to having had sexual relations with Eulenburg. Eulenburg was charged with perjury and brought to trial on May 7, 1908. Two weeks later Harden's conviction was overturned. A second trial was then scheduled.

=== Eulenburg ===
June 29, 1908.
After the first of 41 witnesses, including Ernst and ten witnesses who described watching Eulenburg through a keyhole in 1887, the trial was delayed because of Eulenburg's ill health. It was moved to his hospital bed on July 17, but was delayed again. The trial was postponed indefinitely in 1909; until that point Eulenburg had twice-yearly undergone a medical examination to determine if he was well enough to stand trial.

=== Moltke v. Harden ===
April, 1909.
The trial date was originally set for November 24, 1908, but was postponed. With little press, Harden was again convicted and fined six hundred marks plus the forty thousand marks of court costs, while Moltke was rehabilitated in the public eye.

== Effects ==
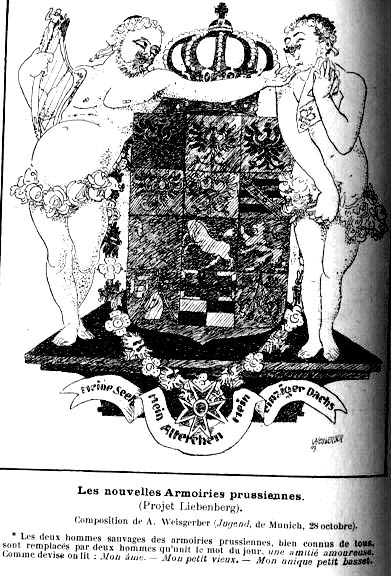
Satirical cartoon portraying the "new" coat of arms of Prussia as supported by homosexual men, published in Jugend magazine

The stress of the trials caused most participants to get ill during 1908.

In November 1908, the chief of the Military Secretariat Dietrich von Hülsen-Haeseler died of a heart attack while performing a pas seul dressed in a woman's ballet tutu for Wilhelm II and his hunting party, requiring further damage control in the form of a cover up.

Harden, like some in the upper echelons of the military and Foreign Office, resented Eulenburg's approval of the Anglo-French Entente, and also his encouragement of Wilhelm to rule personally. The scandal led to Wilhelm suffering a nervous breakdown, and the removal of Eulenburg and others of his circle from the court. Despite Eulenburg's own approval of Weltpolitik, his clique was a stabilizing factor. By removing Eulenburg, Harden enabled his own highly aggressive foreign policy to take root in the Auswärtiges Amt. By 1914, Harden had moved sufficiently to the right that he welcomed the German invasion of Belgium. During the war, Harden was an annexationist who wrote numerous articles demanding that Germany win the war, annex most of Europe, Africa, and Asia, and become the world's greatest power. However, after the defeat of Germany he became a pacifist. Eulenburg himself was irrelevant by then.

The Eulenburg affair has been held up as one example of anti-homosexuality sentiment being used as a means to attain certain political goals. As Eulenburg's wife later commented, "They are striking at my husband, but their target is the kaiser."

The affair also led people in other countries to perceive homosexuality as especially prevalent in Germany. New euphemisms for homosexuality came into use, such as le vice allemand ('the German vice') or Eulenbougre (in French), or Berlinese (Italian).

== See also ==
- Daily Telegraph Affair, a concurrent political scandal in Germany
- LGBT rights in Germany
- Röhm scandal
  - Gay Nazis myth
- Frankfurt homosexual trials
- Persecution of homosexuals in Nazi Germany

== References and further reading ==
- Doktor, Frederik (2021). Die Eulenburg-Affäre und die Genese des modernen Homosexualitätskonzepts. transcript Verlag. ISBN 978-3-8394-5356-8.
- Domeier, Norman. The Eulenburg Affair. A Cultural History of Politics the German Empire (German History in Context 1), New York 2015, ISBN 978-1571139122.
- Domeier, Norman. "The homosexual scare and the masculinization of German politics before World War I." Central European History 47.4 (2014): 737–759.
- Duberman, Martin. Jews Queers Germans (Seven Stories Press, 2017).
- Dynes, Wayne R. (ed.) Encyclopedia of Homosexuality. (New York and London, Garland Publishing, 1990).
- Hull, Isabel V. The Entourage of Kaiser Wilhelm II, 1888–1918 (2004) excerpt
- Johansson, Warren and Percy, William A. Outing: Shattering the Conspiracy of Silence. (Harrington Park Press, 1994).
- Massie, Robert K. Dreadnought: Britain, Germany, and the coming of the Great War (Random House, 1991) excerpt see Dreadnought (book), popular history pp 663–679.
- Röhl, John. The Kaiser and his Court: Wilhelm II and the Government of Germany (Cambridge: Cambridge University Press, 1994)
- Röhl, John C. G; Sombart, Nicolaus (Editors) Kaiser Wilhelm II New Interpretations: The Corfu Papers, (Cambridge University Press, 1982).
- Young, Harry F. Maximilian Harden. Censor Germaniae: The Critic in Opposition from Bismarck to the Rise of Nazism (The Hague: M. Nijhoff, 1959).
