= Kuno von Moltke =

German general (1847–1923)

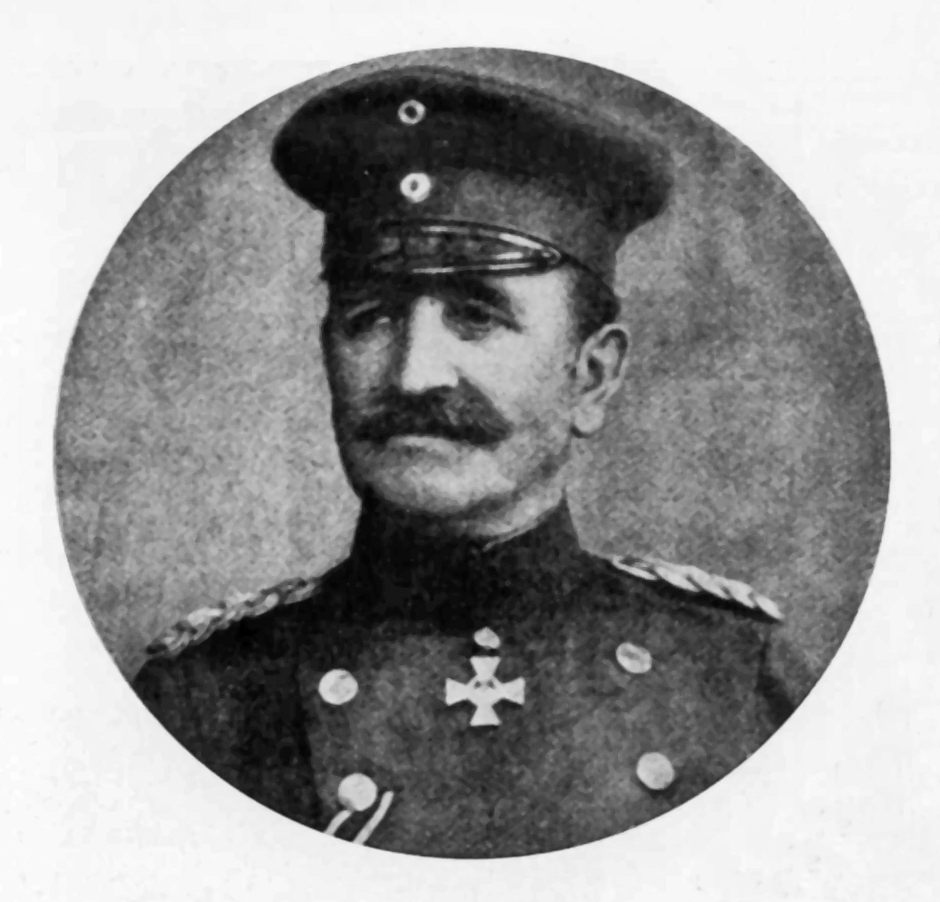
Kuno von Moltke

Lieutenant General Kuno Augustus Friedrich Karl Detlev Graf von Moltke (13 December 1847 – 19 March 1923), adjutant to Kaiser Wilhelm II and military commander of Berlin, was a principal in the homosexual scandal known as the Harden-Eulenburg Affair (1907) that rocked the Kaiser's entourage. Moltke was forced to leave the military service.

== Biography ==
=== Early life and military career ===
Kuno Augustus Friedrich Karl Detlev Graf von Moltke was born on 13 December 1847 in Neustrelitz, in the Grand Duchy of Mecklenburg-Strelitz. He belonged to the German noble House of Moltke. His father was Count Friedrich Karl Ludwig von Moltke (1798–1860), and his mother was Marie Eugenie von Roeder (1810–1875). His parents married in Potsdam in 1834 and had six children together. Although he shared his surname with the Prussian field marshal Helmuth von Moltke the Elder, he belonged to a different branch of the family.

Following the military traditions of his family, Moltke entered the Prussian Army in 1866. During the Franco-Prussian War of 1870–1871, he served as a second lieutenant in the 1st Silesian Life Cuirassier Regiment. During the conflict, he sustained a gunshot wound to his forearm and received treatment at a military hospital in Étampes, France. For his wartime service, he was awarded the Iron Cross, Second Class.

Alongside his military career, Moltke developed a strong interest in music and gained recognition as an accomplished pianist. He became a close friend of Philipp, Prince of Eulenburg, whose connections to the imperial court played an important role in Moltke's subsequent career. Through Eulenburg, Moltke was introduced to Wilhelm II in 1888 and became a regular member of the emperor's personal entourage. He accompanied Wilhelm on riding and hunting excursions at Hubertusstock and participated in musical gatherings at Eulenburg's Liebenberg estate, where he entertained guests with his piano performances.

Moltke was also active as a composer of military music. In 1892, he composed Des Großen Kurfürsten Reitermarsch (The Great Elector's Cavalry March), dedicated to the 1st Life Cuirassier Regiment in Breslau, in which he had served from 1884 to 1889. The composition was first performed in Prökelwitz, East Prussia, on 31 May 1892, and was officially adopted as an army march later that year.

In 1893, Moltke was appointed an aide-de-camp to Emperor Wilhelm II, strengthening his position within the imperial household. He became a member of the emperor's circle of aristocratic friends and advisers, commonly known as the Liebenberg Circle. His position at court combined military service with participation in the social and artistic activities of the imperial entourage.

In 1896 Moltke, a 'confirmed bachelor' in his early 50s, married Nathalie von Hayden ('Lilly'), a woman more than twenty years his junior. The couple soon became estranged, with Moltke's physician later alleging that Lilly had physically attacked Moltke several times. The couple were eventually divorced in 1902 (the formal divorce proceedings took several years to conclude).

== The Eulenburg affair ==
In 1907, the journalist Maximilian Harden publicly accused Moltke and Philipp, Prince of Eulenburg of a homosexual relationship. At this time, homosexual acts between men were illegal per Paragraph 175 of the German Criminal Code.

Accusations and counter-accusations quickly multiplied. Later that year, Moltke sued Harden for libel. His ex-wife Lilly (who had since remarried and was now called Lilly von Elbe) voluntarily testified against him. Magnus Hirschfeld, a physician and sexologist who supported the legalization of homosexuality in Germany, testified that he believed Moltke to be homosexual. The court "sensationally" acquitted Harden, concluding that he had been telling the truth about Moltke's sexuality. However, the verdict was voided due to faulty procedure.

In 1908, Harden was retried, and this time he was found guilty of libel against Moltke.

== German press reaction ==
After the first trial, the German press were sympathetic to Moltke. Newspapers condemned the tactics of the defense and expressing condolence with Count von Moltke, who was declared to have presented a dignified figure in court. Berliner Tageblatt condemned Harden for his salacious articles, and argued that they amounted to the unnecessary hunting down of an old soldier.

== Later life ==
Following the public accusations made during the Harden–Eulenburg affair, Moltke retired from military service in May 1907, relinquishing his position as military commandant of Berlin. During subsequent court proceedings, he stated that he had submitted his resignation because he considered it incompatible with his position as a senior officer to remain in uniform while facing public allegations concerning his private life. His retirement was approved by an imperial cabinet order dated 24 May 1907. Moltke maintained that he had left the army honourably and described his legal action against Maximilian Harden as an attempt to restore his reputation after a long military career.

The legal proceedings continued after the initial trials of 1907 and 1908. In May 1908, the Reichsgericht overturned an earlier judgment against Harden because of a procedural irregularity, requiring the case to be reconsidered. On 19 March 1909, Moltke and Harden signed a joint declaration stating that Harden had not accused Moltke of homosexuality in his published articles. Both men expressed the view that further examination of evidence was unnecessary and subsequently agreed that they would not oppose the termination of the proceedings. However, the Berlin court declined to dismiss the case on procedural grounds.

The final hearing took place on 20 April 1909. Harden was found guilty of publishing statements considered damaging to Moltke's public reputation and was fined 600 marks, together with the costs of the proceedings. Following the judgment, the two men exchanged correspondence concerning their earlier agreement. In a letter dated 12 June 1909, Moltke reaffirmed his acceptance of Harden's declaration and expressed regret that his statements during the hearing might have appeared inconsistent with their settlement. Harden subsequently withdrew his appeal on 15 June 1909, bringing the litigation to an end.

The scandal effectively ended Moltke's position within the imperial court. His departure formed part of the wider removal of associates of Philipp, Prince of Eulenburg, from the immediate entourage of Wilhelm II. Moltke did not return to his former command in Berlin and played little further part in public life. The affair contributed to the dissolution of the informal aristocratic circle that had previously exercised influence through its personal connections with the emperor.

Moltke died on 19 March 1923 in Breslau, Germany (now Wrocław, Poland), at the age of 75. His death was reported in the international press, including the North Otago Times in New Zealand, which recalled his involvement in the imperial court scandals of 1907.

Moltke's surviving personal papers, covering the period from 1898 to 1923, are preserved in the Secret State Archives Prussian Cultural Heritage Foundation under the collection reference VI. HA, Nl Moltke, K. v..

== Orders and decorations ==
German honours

- Service Award Cross (Prussia)
- Iron Cross, 2nd Class (Prussia)
- Knight of the Order of the Red Eagle, 3rd Class with Bow and Crown; 2nd Class with Oak Leaves (Prussia)
- Knight of the Royal Order of the Crown, 2nd Class with Star (Prussia)
- Knight's Cross of the Royal House Order of Hohenzollern (Prussia)
- Commander of the Order of the Zähringer Lion, 2nd Class, 1894; Commander 1st Class, 1904 (Baden)
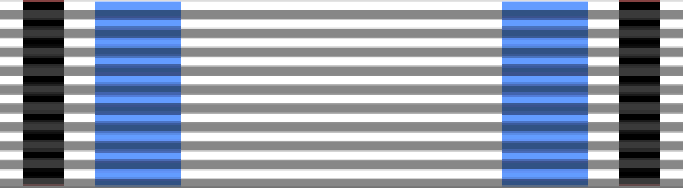
- Knight of the Military Merit Order, 2nd Class with Swords; Commander (Bavaria)
- Grand Commander of the House Order of the Wendish Crown (Mecklenburg)
- Grand Cross of the Order of the Griffon (Mecklenburg)
- Commander of the Order of the White Falcon (Saxe-Weimar-Eisenach)
- Commander of the Albert Order, 1st Class (Saxony)
- Cross of Honour of the House Order of Schaumburg-Lippe, 2nd Class (Schaumburg-Lippe)
- Cross of Honour of the Order of the Württemberg Crown, with Crown, 1893 (Württemberg)

Foreign honours

- Knight of the Imperial Order of the Iron Crown, 2nd Class (Austria-Hungary)
- Commander of the Imperial Austrian Order of Franz Joseph, with Star (Austria-Hungary)
- Commander of the Order of Saints Maurice and Lazarus (Italy)
- Commander of the Order of Orange-Nassau (Netherlands)
- Order of the Medjidie, 1st Class (Ottoman Empire)
- Knight of the Imperial Order of Saint Anna, 2nd Class in Diamonds (Russia)
- Knight of the Imperial Order of Saint Stanislaus, 1st Class (Russia)
- Commander of the Most Noble Order of the Crown of Siam (Siam)
- Commander of the Royal Order of the Sword (Sweden)
