= Maximilian Harden =

German journalist (1861–1927)

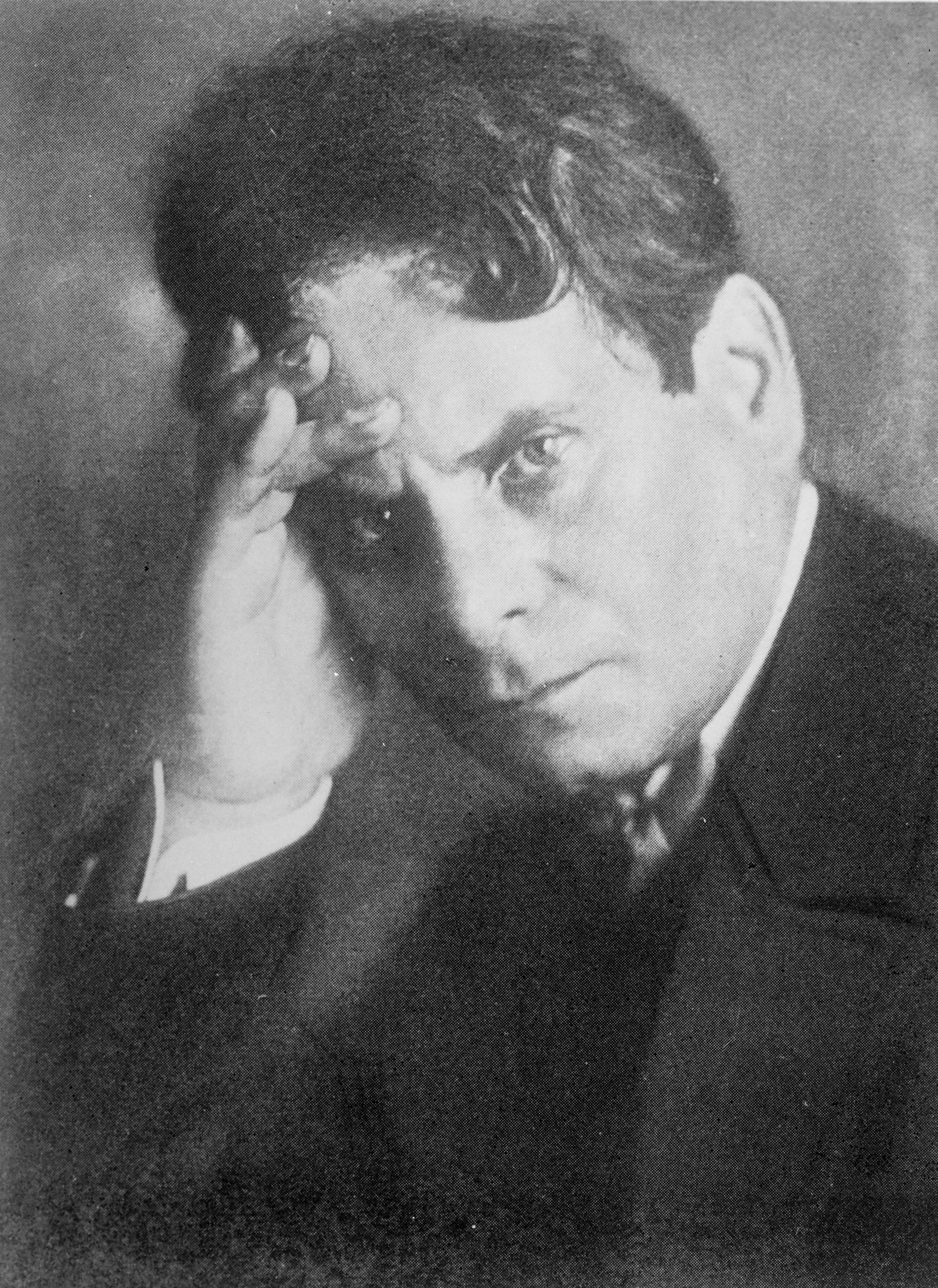
- Photograph by Rudolf Dührkoop (1914)
- Born: Maximilian Harden; 20 October 1861
- Died: 30 October 1927 (aged 66)

Maximilian Harden (born Felix Ernst Witkowski, 20 October 1861 – 30 October 1927) was an influential German journalist and editor.

== Biography ==
Born the son of a Jewish merchant in Berlin, he attended the Französisches Gymnasium until he began to train as an actor and joined a traveling theatre troupe. In 1878 Harden converted to Protestantism and started his journalistic career as a theatre critic in 1884. He also published political essays under the pseudonym Apostata in several liberal newspapers like the Berliner Tageblatt edited by Rudolf Mosse.

Commencing from 1892, Harden published the journal Die Zukunft (The Future) in Berlin. His baroque style was mocked by former friend Karl Kraus, who wrote a satire entitled "Translations from Harden".

Initially a monarchist, Harden became a fierce critic of Kaiser Wilhelm II and his entourage including Philipp, Prince of Eulenburg, and General Kuno von Moltke. His public accusations, from 1906 on for homosexual behaviour—according to Paragraph 175 of the criminal code, a criminal offence at that time—led to numerous trials and caused sustained damage to the reputation of the ruling House of Hohenzollern and the German jurisdiction, the whole episode denoted as the Eulenburg affair.

In reaction, Karl Kraus, disgusted by the public display of intimate details, in 1907 wrote an obituary: Maximilian Harden. Eine Erledigung (A Takedown).

By 1914, Harden had moved sufficiently to the right that he welcomed the German invasion of Belgium. During the war, Harden was an annexationist who wrote numerous articles demanding that Germany win the war to annex most of Europe, Africa, and Asia to make the Reich the world's greatest power. However, after the war, he turned into a pacifist and supported the regime of the Weimar Republic. In 1921, he devoted two issues of Die Zukunft to the assassination of Talat Pasha and the subsequent trial of the assassin, harshly criticizing Germany's failure to take action against the Armenian genocide.

In the following years, Harden's readership diminished. On 3 July 1922, a few days after the assassination of Walther Rathenau, he was severely injured in an assault conducted by Freikorps members. In the following trial, the court ruled that his writings had "provoked" the two assailants, Bert Weichardt and Albert Wilhelm Grenz. Both were charged and sentenced to two years and five months, and four years, respectively.

Harden abandoned the publishing of Die Zukunft and, in 1923, retired to Montana, Switzerland, where he died four years later. His grave is located in Berlin at the Friedhof Heerstraße (Feld 8-C-10 (Reg. 335) (Ehrengrab)).

British historian A. J. P. Taylor wrote:

Harden was certainly the most brilliant political writer during the reign of Wilhelm II. His paper, Die Zukunft, had a unique influence despite its small circulation. But Harden's spirit was essentially critical and destructive. He always took up men when they were down—Bismarck after his fall and Holstein after his resignation. Equally he denounced those who were up—Wilhelm II when in power, and even Ebert. His outstanding achievement was to hound Eulenburg from public life—not much to be really proud of. In international affairs, he swung from one extreme to another: at one time a Big Navy man, later an advocate of a naval agreement. At the beginning of the First World War, he was a violent annexationist, towards its end, a Wilsonian democrat and internationalist. He remained constant only in his high opinion of himself and contempt for everybody else.

== See also ==
- Harden–Eulenburg Affair
