= Friedrich Wend zu Eulenburg =

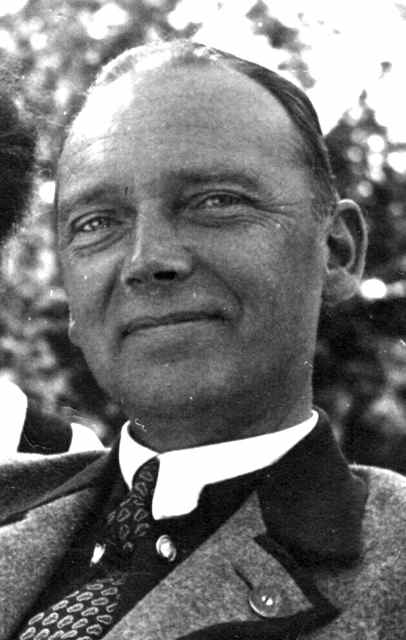
Friedrich-Wend Fürst zu Eulenburg und Hertefeld, Hinterstoder 1924

Friedrich-Wend, Count of Eulenburg and Hertefeld, known as Prince of Eulenburg and Hertefeld, Count of Sandels (19 September 1881, in Starnberg – 1 August 1963, at Hertefeld Castle in Weeze), was a German aristocratic farmer and estate owner of Liebenberg and Häsen in (Brandenburg) as well as Hertefeld and the Castle of Kolk (Niederrhein).

== Origin and education ==
Friedrich-Wend was the oldest surviving son of Philipp, Prince of Eulenburg (1847–1921) and his wife Augusta, born Countess Sandels (1853–1941), daughter of Samuel, the last Count Sandels, and Augusta Tersmeden. On account of his father's diplomatic duties he spent his childhood and school days in Starnberg, Oldenburg, Stuttgart and Vienna. On attaining his Abitur, Friedrich-Wend joined the 1st Guards Infantry Division in 1902 and a year later the Kriegsschule in Engers. In 1906 he withdrew from the military with the rank of Lieutenant of Reserves.

During his time in Vienna he had met his later wife, the Austrian Marie von Mayr-Melnhof (1884 -1960). Marie came from the family of the Barons of Mayr von Melnhof that had risen in society very rapidly some decades before; having been the peasants Mayr of the Melnhof, they succeeded in paving the way for the industrialisation of Styria, and thus acquired a vast fortune. This fortune was invested in large areas of forestry and formed the basis of the Mayr-Melnhof company today.

== Marriage, the Harden-Eulenburg affair and World War I ==
Wedding of Friedrich-Wend and Marie took place on 21 My 1904 at Liebenberg in the presence of the Emperor Wilhelm II. Because of the bride's Catholic confession, it had been a problematic union, as Wilhelm II had elevated his friend Philip zu Eulenberg to the rank of prince just a few years earlier in an attempt to create parity between the Catholic and Protestant peers of the empire. The impending marriage appeared to threaten this equilibrium, whereupon Wilhelm at first forbade it. The Emperor himself thereupon sought a solution by asking Pope Pius X to grant an exception. This led to the marriage being celebrated in both confessions and all the children were later baptised in the Protestant faith. Immediately thereafter, between 1904 and 1906 the so-called Lake House, was built for the young couple on the shores of a lake close to the family estate, the costs being met by the bridal dowry.

After his wedding, Friedrich-Wend set out on a course of agricultural studies at the University of Halle, that he was, however, unable to complete. The dramatic events of Harden-Eulenburg affair involving his father in the period between 1907 and 1909 made it necessary for him to be present with his family, for the two older sons were often called upon to physically protect their father from the surge of Paparazzi. The family doctor, Wilhelm zur Linden, writes in his memoirs that he was still treating the after-effects of the shock in Friedrich-Wend in the year 1937. So at the age of 26, Friedrich-Wend took over full responsibility for the family affairs, erecting a brickworks the following year and beginning with the mechanisation of the agricultural estate.

In the course of the general mobilisation, he was called for active service in August 1914. His regiment advanced through Belgium and reached Ghent during the offensive, after which he was awarded the Iron Cross 1st. Class. Soon after this he was poisoned by locals. For months he could only take in fluids and only regained his health after many years. In June 1915 his younger brother, Botho Sigwart fell in Galicia when a shot pierced his lung. His death brought considerable consequences for the family, who had been close to Rudolf Steiner and received him as guest at Liebenberg estate occasionally since 1906. Sigwart had been an avid student of Anthroposophy together with two of his sisters, Tora and Lyki and with his sister-in-law, Marie, the wife of Friedrich-Wend. Soon after he died, they felt he was trying to communicate with them from the world beyond, made extensive notes and showed these to Rudolf Steiner. The three volumes Bridge Over the River give an account of these communications.

After the First World War, things changed considerably also for the circumstances at Liebenberg, which was no longer competitive. Friedrich-Wend, heir to the title after the death of his father in 1921, engaged an external consultant in 1925, Rudolf, Baron of Engelhardt-Schönheyden, under whose management the estate was successfully upgraded. In 1926 Engelhardt married the daughter of his employer, Ingeborg, Countess zu Eulenburg and moved with her into one wing of the Lake House.

== The family under the Nazi regime ==
As a monarchist, Eulenburg was a member of and involved with the conservative German National People's Party (DNVP). He soon realised, however, that the influence of the large landowners could only be maintained if they had broad basis of support amongst the masses. He saw in the Nazi Party (NSDAP), that had already outdistanced the DNVP during the 1930 elections, a political force that could secure this broad popular consent. He therefore met with Adolf Hitler in 1931 in order to address the interests of the big landowners:

"In order to clarify this question I decided to seek out Adolf Hitler personally in order to hear directly out of his mouth what we could expect from him."

After this conversation, Friedrich-Wend believed to have found in Hitler the right man to secure his aims. He thereupon wrote to the other landowners so as to encourage them to join the NSDAP:

"If we do not wish to embrace Bolshevism we have no other choice but to enter into this party which, despite many socialist ideas, is the counter-pole of Marxism and Bolshevism."

He became a member of the party himself and the bulk of the population of Liebenberg later followed his example. His son-in-law, Baron von Engelhardt, had already some years earlier founded a Liebenberg branch of the National Socialist Motor Corps (NSKK), organising field games and battle exercises.

The Eulenburg's neighbour on the next estate was Hermann Göring, who had built a country residence, Carinhall in the Schorfheide forest nearby. He would at times join the deer hunting on the Liebenberg estate. It was during one of these stays at Liebenberg that the niece of Eulenburg, Libertas Schulze-Boysen, who had spent the decisive years of her childhood with the family at Liebenberg, spoke to Göring on behalf of her fiancé, Harro Schulze-Boysen. He was in a subordinate position in Göring's Reichsluftfahrtministerium, the Ministry of Aviation, and shortly after this he was promoted. The couple were married in 1936 at Liebenberg. Six years later, Harro and Libertas were identified as the heads of the resistance group Rote Kapelle, by the Gestapo and executed in December 1942 at Plötzensee Prison.

In reaction, the only son of Friedrich-Wend, Wend, Count of Eulenburg (1908–1986), who had up to that point been classified as "u.K." (indispensable), at once received his call-up papers to a Strafbattalion (penal battalion), unit that experienced an extraordinarily high rate of casualties, and was sent to the Eastern Front to combat partisans. His father continued ceaselessly to attempt to secure his transfer and Wend eventually was moved into a tank battalion that was completely wiped out during the Allied invasion of Salerno. He survived the war and was taken prisoner in April 1945 by American troops near Como.

Prior to this, in 1941, Prince Eulenburg had already drawn the attention of the Nazi authorities when he signed a petition calling for the release of the priests of the Christian Community, who had been arrested as a body by the Gestapo on 10 June 1941, the churches prohibited and their property confiscated. Other notable signatories to the petition were the operatic soprano, Marta Fuchs, the two marine captains Helmuth von Ruckteschell and Hans Erdmenger together with his wife, as well as a few officials from some of the ministries. The priests had been released from captivity some two months later, but the signatories' names had been noted by the Gestapo.

== Fleeing to West Germany, rebuilding and death ==
Friedrich-Wend and his wife fled in April 1945 as the last of the family to leave Liebenberg right before the invasion of the Red Army troops. They spent the next years on their estate of Gut Kaden in Schleswig-Holstein while the Soviet military administration of Germany confiscated their properties in Liebenberg and Häsen. The family estates of Hertefeld and Kolk, as well as the forestry and hunting estates of his wife Marie in Austria were either destroyed or occupied by refugees.

By 1947 Friedrich Wend had once again built up the revenue administration of the main estate, Hertefeld, while his son Wend re-established the agricultural concerns. When the last refugees had left the estate in Hinterstoder, Upper Austria the family could once again take possession of it. Prince Eulenburg devoted the last years of his life to his family and to the hunt until his death on 1 August 1963 at Hertefeld, where he lies buried next to his wife, Marie, who had preceded him in 1961.

== Descendants ==
Children:

- 1. Ingeborg (Ingi) Gräfin zu Eulenburg (* 8. September 1906; † 15. December 2000)

∞ 1. Rudolf Baron von Engelhardt (* 18. September 1896; † 27. August 1991) (divorced) 4 children
∞ 2. Carl-August von Schoenebeck (* 19. January 1898; † 4. September 1989) 2 children

- 2. Wend Graf (bore the title of prince only genealogically) zu Eulenburg and Hertefeld; heir to Hertefeld and Kolk (* 28. October 1908; † 26. August 1986)

∞ 1. Hildegard Semper (* 10. June 1913; † 25. April 1986) (divorced) 2 children
∞ 2. Gisela von der Schulenburg (* 29. June 1920; † 22. May 2014)

Grandchildren:

- Philipp (carries the princely title solely genealogically) Graf zu Eulenburg und Hertefeld (* 27. April 1938); heir to Hertefeld and Kolk. (Sister: Fides von Gersdorff, b. Gräfin zu Eulenburg (* 7. Oktober 1943) ∞ Bolko von Gersdorff (* 18. November 1938), 2 Kinder)

∞ Christiane Pollay (* 16. August 1941; † 13. January 2013) 2 sons

Great-grandchildren:

- Friedrich Graf zu Eulenburg and Hertefeld (* 7. September 1966; Heir to Hertefeld)

∞ Patricia Erkel (* 15. January 1970) 2 daughters, 1 Son

- Siegwart Graf zu Eulenburg and Hertefeld (* 27. März 1969; Heir to Kolk)

∞ Franziska Wirtz (* 17. January 1973) 1 daughter, 1 son

== Notable relatives ==
His great-uncle was the Prussian Minister of the Interior Friedrich Albrecht zu Eulenburg, and other uncles the Prussian Prime Minister (1892–1894) and Minister of the Interior Botho zu Eulenburg and the royal Prussian Oberhofmarschall August zu Eulenburg. The composer Botho Sigwart zu Eulenburg was his younger brother. The resistance fighter Libertas Schulze-Boysen, who grew up at Schloss Liebenberg, was his niece.

== See also ==
- Eulenburg (surname)
- Harden-Eulenburg affair

== Literature ==
- Stephan Malinowski: Vom König zum Führer. Deutscher Adel und Nationalsozialismus. Fischer Taschenbuch Verlag, 2010, S. 447, 477–479, 519.
- Andrea Geffers, Jörn Lehmann: Schloss und Gut Liebender in Geschichte und Gegenwart. Hrsg. Kuratorium der DKB Stiftung für gesellschaftliches Engagement, Liebenberg 2006, S. 21–37.
- Stefan Müller: Liebenberg – Ein verkauftes Dorf. Im Selbstverlag BoD, 2003, S. 25–74.
- Genealogisches Handbuch des Adels, Fürstliche Häuser XVI. Band 124, Starke 2001.
- Wend Graf zu Eulenburg-Hertefeld: Ein Schloß in der Mark Brandenburg. DVA / Engelhorn Verlag, Stuttgart 1990.
- Friedrich-Wend Graf zu Eulenburg-Hertefeld: Erinnerungen an den Feldzug 1914. o.A. August 1915.
- Kurt Gossweiler, Alfred Schlicht: Die Junker und die NSDAP 1931/32, in: ZfG 15 (1967), Heft 4, S. 644–662.
