= Schwarzbach (Mulde) =

River in Germany

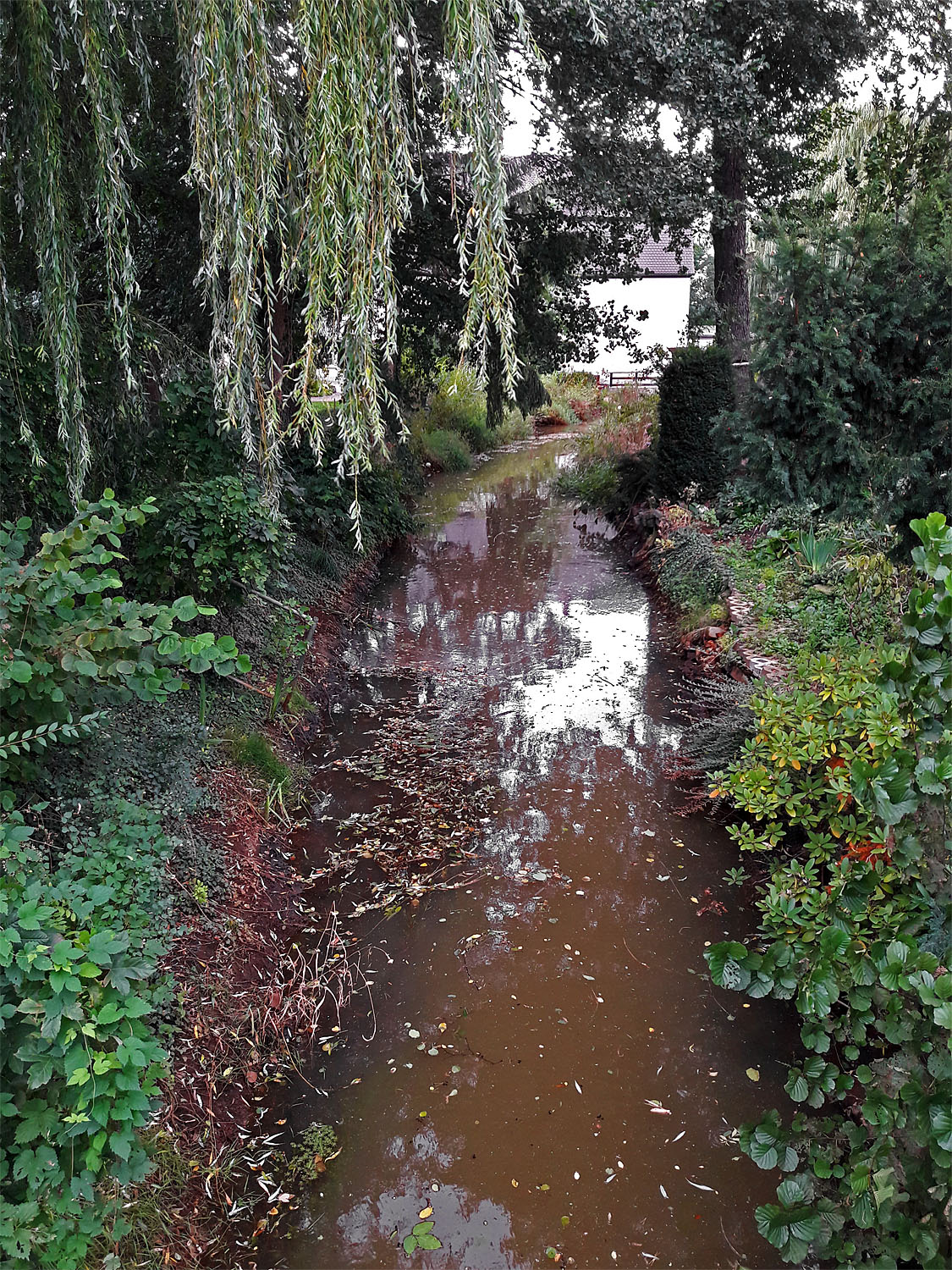

Location
- Country: Germany
- States: Saxony

Physical characteristics
- Source
  - location: Eilenburg
  - coordinates: 51°29′29.41″N 12°40′55.19″E
- Mouth
  - location: Mulde
  - coordinates: 51.5882°N 12.5813°E

Basin features
- Progression: Mulde→ Elbe→ North Sea
- River system: Elbe

The Schwarzbach (German pronunciation: [ˈʃvaʁtsˌbax]) is a river of Saxony, Germany. It rises in Eilenberg and flows northerly from there through the communities of Sprotta, Doberschütz, Battaune, Wöllnau, Pressel, Authausen, Görschlitz and Bad Düben, where it becomes a right tributary of the Mulde. It drains a watershed of 180 square kilometres (69 sq mi).

== See also ==
- List of rivers of Saxony
