= Eulenberg (disambiguation) =

Eulenberg is a municipality in Rhineland-Palatinate, Germany

Eulenberg or Eulenburg may also refer to:

== People ==
- Eulenburg (surname)
- Philipp, Prince of Eulenburg and Hertefeld (1847–1921)

== Other uses ==
- Ernst Eulenburg (musical editions), music publisher established by Ernst Eulenburg
- Eulenburg Expedition, a diplomatic mission conducted by Friedrich Albrecht zu Eulenburg to establish diplomatic and commercial relations with China, Japan and Siam (now Thailand)
- Eulenburg Affair, or Harden–Eulenburg Affair, a controversy regarding accusations of homosexual conduct, and accompanying libel trials, among prominent members of Kaiser Wilhelm II's cabinet and entourage
- Sovinec (German: Eulenburg), a castle in Bruntál District of the Czech Republic

== See also ==
- Eilenburg, a town in Saxony, Germany
