= Eilenberg =

Eilenberg is a surname. Notable people with the surname include:

- Samuel Eilenberg (1913–1998), Polish mathematician
- Richard Eilenberg (1848–1927), German composer

== Named after Samuel ==
- Eilenberg–MacLane space
- Eilenberg–Moore algebra
- Eilenberg–Steenrod axioms
- Eilenberg machine

== See also ==
- Eilenburg
- Eulenberg (disambiguation)
