= Hertefeld Castle =

Coordinates: 51°37′42.5″N 6°12′5.5″E

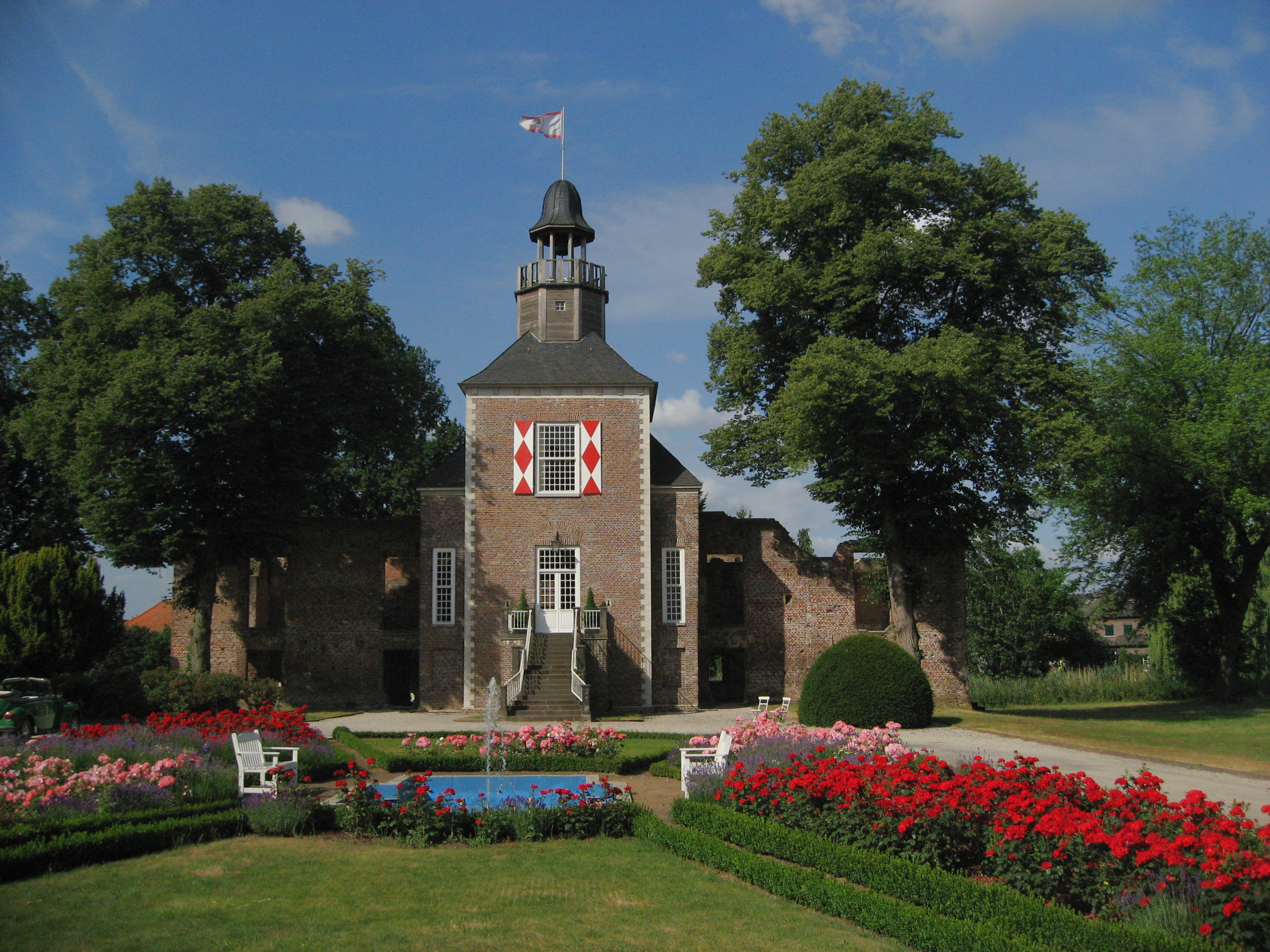
Hertefeld castle

The Hertefeld Castle estate, consisting of a castle ruin and attached park, stands in the town of Weeze in North Rhine-Westphalia. It was established in the fourteenth century.

== Inhabitants and owners ==
The castle was first mentioned as a knight's seat in 1322. However, it appears that a family of this name lived nearby for significantly longer, since a man named Theodoricus de Hertevenlde was first mentioned in 1179.

In the fourteenth century the castle was the center of an independent domain. However, this independence disappeared in the following years de to increasing subservience to the dukedom of Cleves. In 1322, the domain excluding the castle was sold in 1322 by Wilhelm von Herteveld to Graf Dietrich VII of Cleves. Three years later, the castle too entered the ownership of Cleves. However, the castle was later returned to the Herteveld family in the person of Stephan II von Herteveld, but now as a loan from the house of Cleves.

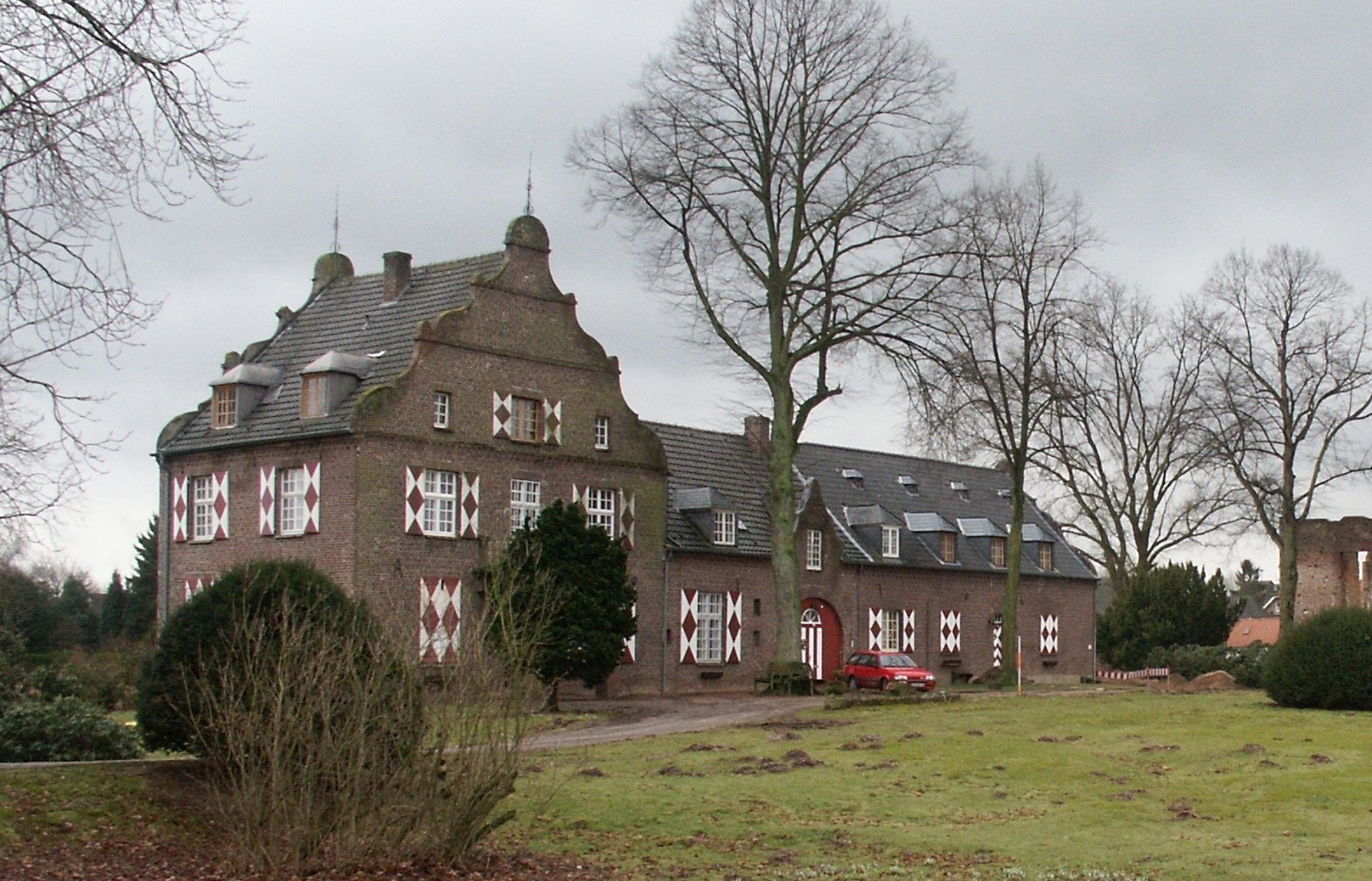
The "Renteigebäude" of Hertefeld castle (2005)

Following the death of the count Stephan IV in 1485, the family was divided via his two sons into two branches. With the senior branch acquiring through marriage the castle of Kolk in Uedam, Hertefeld castle passed to the junior branch under count Heinrich. This branch later died out in the direct line with Elbert von und zu Hertefeld, who however transferred the estate to his stepbrother Elbert von Steenhaus. Facing financial difficulties, Elbert in turn passed it to his relative Jobst Gerhard von Hertefeld, thereby reunifying the property of the two branches. The hartefeld properties had by this time become quite extensive, incorporating not just Uedam and Weeze but also Boetzelaer castle, Hoennepel, Kervenheim and Zelhem (today part of Bronckhorst).

Jobst Gerhard's father had previously through his good relations with the Duke of Brandenburg, Friedrich Wilhelm, inherited the property of Liebenberg in Brandenburg, which he later made the principle residence of his family. His grandson, Samuel von und zu Hertefeld, was raised to the rank of Freiherr by Friedrich I of Prussia, who frequently lodged at Hertefeld castle during his tours of inspection along the lower Rhine. Another prominent guest was Tsar Alexander I of Russia.

The male line of the family died out in 1867 with Karl von Hertefeld, whose grandniece Alexandrine inherited the property. Since she was married to Philipp Konrad zu Eulenburg, Hertefeld became incorporated into his family property. Alexandrine's son Philipp zu Eulenburg became a personal friend of Wilhelm II, who raised him in 1900 to the rank of Furst. Since the family had also acquired the title of Graf from the king of Sweden, he and his successors were henceforth able to style themselves "Fürst zu Eulenburg und Hertefeld, Graf von Sandels". Philipp himself became notorious only a few years later as a result of the Harden-Eulenburg Affair, in which he became a target of the influential publicist Maximilian Harden. In several court cases, he defended himself against allegations of homosexuality without being convicted.

Alexandrines second, Botho Sigwart, became the first family member for some time to make Hertefeld his long-term residence. His opera "Songs of Euripides", which premiered in 1915 at the royal Staatstheater Stuttgart. The principal line of the family returned to Hertefeld at the end of the Second World War, after their principal residence at Liebenburg was confiscated by the East German government.

== History of the building ==
The estate complex today (which is legally preserved as a historic monument), consists of the partially renovated castle ruins, the well-preserved Renteigebäude, and the keepers' lodges, together with a park of roughly 5 hectares. Within the park are an earlier agricultural yard and a small animal park.

Archeological evidence indicates that the site has been in use since the thirteenth century. The predecessor of today's castle, in all probability am inhabited tower or fortified house, dates from the fourteenth century. Around 1500 a gabled building was constructed including a room on the upper floor extending nearly six meters high. Around 1600 the building was extended with a gate tower.

The current building acquired its basic form through the reconstruction and extensions of Samuel von und zu Herteveld. In around 1700, he ordered the main house converted to a Baroque castle, and six years later constructed the "Renteigebäude". The main building acquired two wings with hipped roofs, and the three-storey gate tower was given a Baroque hemet and flanking staircase towers. Function rooms were installed, while the high living rooms were equipped with three meter tall windows. On the north side of the precinct, a Baroque garden was laid out in French style. The main building was surrounded by a moat and accessible only over a wooden bridge via a gatehouse on an island.

Later changes were of only minor or restorative character. In the first third of the eighteenth century the large uneconomical windows in the upper floor were reduced in size. From 1904 the castle was renovated by Furst Philipp. The building acquired steam heating, the gate tower a stoop, and on the north side of the park two watchtowers were constructed.

In February 1945, during World War II, the castle was burnt down. The Rentegebäude was also badly damaged, but was made inhabitable by Fürst Friedrich-Wend in 1946. The park was laid out anew in English landscape style on the foundations of the old moats (some of which had already been filled in the early 19th century.) Partes of the old French gardens were incorporated into this design.

== The castle today ==
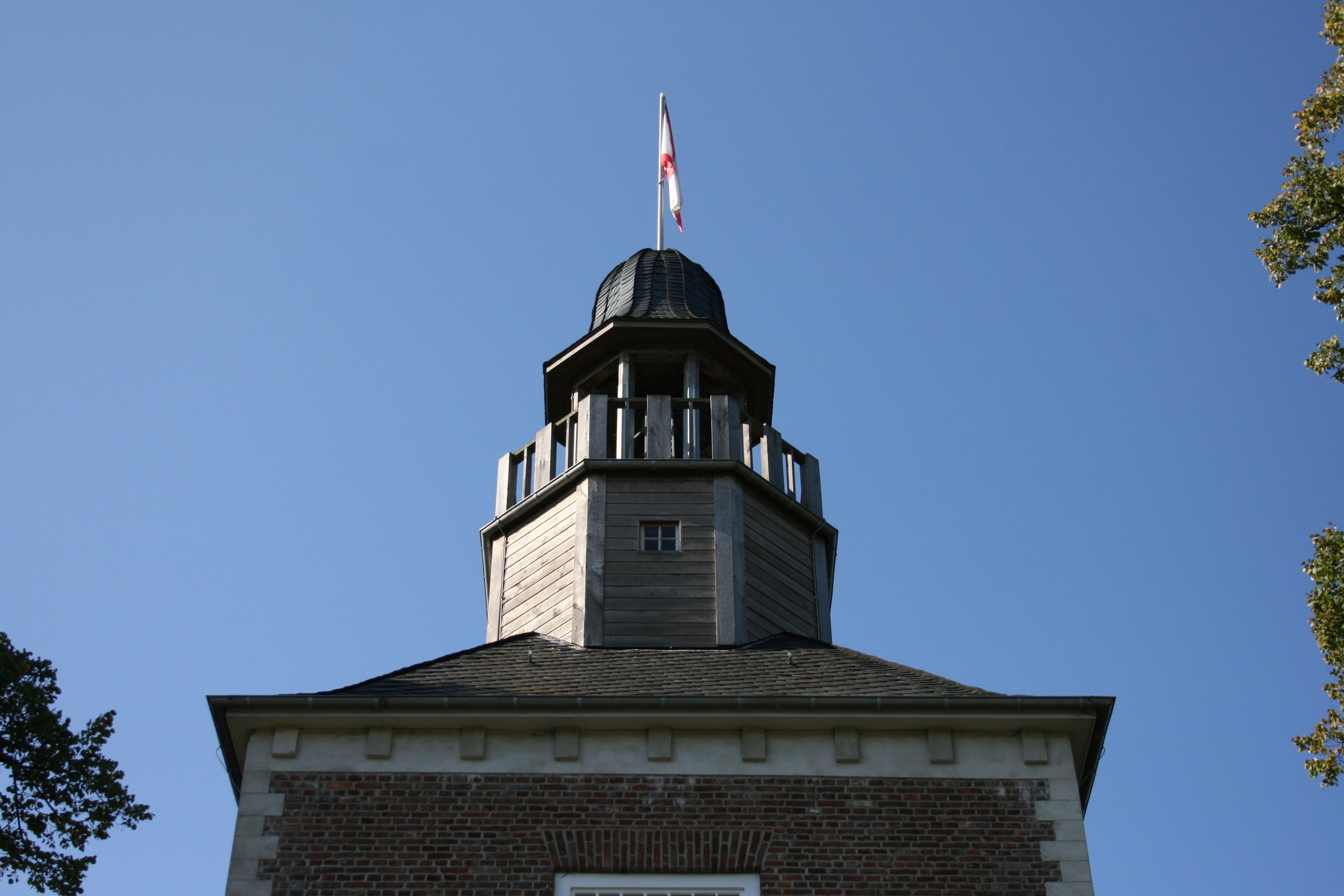
Baroque cap on the tower

Between 1998 and 2006, the castle ruins were restored. An idea formulated in 1947 was carried out: what remained of the castle was examined and measured and partially rebuilt. The central portion of the building and the historic main tower were recreated, and in April 2005 the tower was given a replica of its original Baroque cap, based on a 1734 drawing by Jan de Beijer, which was fashioned from some ten tonnes of oak, and a 280 kg bronze bell, inscribed with the Hertefeld arms, the year 2004, and the motto Gottes Wort bleibt ewig (The word of God remains eternally).

The formerly overgrown park was also restored.

The castle remains in the possession of the family and is now a successful hotel. The ruin, the rental building, the guardhouses and the park are available for overnight visits, events, weddings and conferences.

== Links ==
- Website of the castle
- Video of the castle
- Hotel website
