= Eulenburg (surname) =

Eulenburg is a German surname. Notable people with the surname include:

- Albert Eulenburg (1840–1917), German neurologist
- Botho zu Eulenburg (1831–1912), Prussian statesman
- August zu Eulenburg (1838–1921), Marshal of the Royal Court of Prussia
- Friedrich Albrecht zu Eulenburg (1815–1881), Prussian diplomat and politician
- Hedda Eulenberg (1876–1960), German translator
- Herbert Eulenberg (1876–1949), German writer
- Botho Sigwart zu Eulenburg (1884–1915), German composer
- Friedrich Wend zu Eulenburg (1881–1963), German prince and landowner
- Philipp, Prince of Eulenburg (1847–1921), German diplomat and friend of Wilhelm II, German Emperor
