= Weeze =

- Municipality
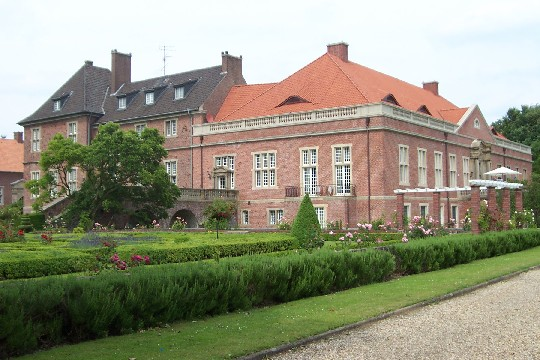
- Kalbeck Castle

- Flag Coat of arms

- Location of Weeze within Kleve district
- Interactive map of Weeze
- Location within Germany Location within North Rhine-Westphalia
- Coordinates: 51°37′36″N 6°11′48″E
- Country: Germany
- State: North Rhine-Westphalia
- Admin. region: Düsseldorf
- District: Kleve

Government
  - Mayor (2020–25): Georg Koenen (Ind.)

Area
  - Total: 79.49 km^{2} (30.69 sq mi)
- Elevation: 18 m (59 ft)

Population (2025-12-31)
  - Total: 12,364
  - Density: 155.5/km^{2} (402.9/sq mi)
- Time zone: UTC+01:00 (CET)
  - Summer (DST): UTC+02:00 (CEST)
- Postal codes: 47652 4179 1793
- Dialling codes: 0 28 37
- Vehicle registration: KLE, GEL
- Website: www.weeze.de

Weeze (German pronunciation: [ˈveːtsə]) is a municipality in the Lower Rhine (Niederrhein) region, located in the northwestern part of North Rhine-Westphalia, specifically in the district of Kleve and the Düsseldorf region.

The municipality comprises the town of Weeze and the village of Wemb and has approximately 12,000 inhabitants. Situated in the district of Kleve, it is embedded in the northwestern part of the Lower Rhine Region, lying between Goch to the north and Kevelaer to the south. The Netherlands is directly west of Weeze.

== History ==
Individual artifacts from the area's earliest settlement date back to the early/middle Stone Age. In subsequent periods, various historical items have been found on municipal soil. These include a burial site with 1,000 tumuli in the area of Kalbeck, settlement remains on the Hees, remnants of a Roman road between Cologne and Nijmegen in the Netherlands, and a significant discovery of Roman silver coins. Franconian burial sites from around the 8th century have also been unearthed near the town center.

Weeze's history is reflected in several landmarks, such as the restored Catholic Church of St. Cyriakus, archaeological excavations from the Stone and Bronze Ages, Wissen Castle complete with its moat, Kalbeck Castle, and the ruins of Hertefeld Castle.

The area in and around present-day Weeze was first mentioned in a document from King Lothar II in 855. In this document, the King presented Count Ansfried with an estate east of the River Niers, known mainly as Villa Geizefurt and situated primarily in the farmstead area of Kalbeck.

The area was populated before the name "Weeze" was officially recorded for the first time in a document in 1226. In this document, Earl Henry III of Alpen presented the Zisterzienserkloster Kamp with an estate in the farmstead of Vornick.

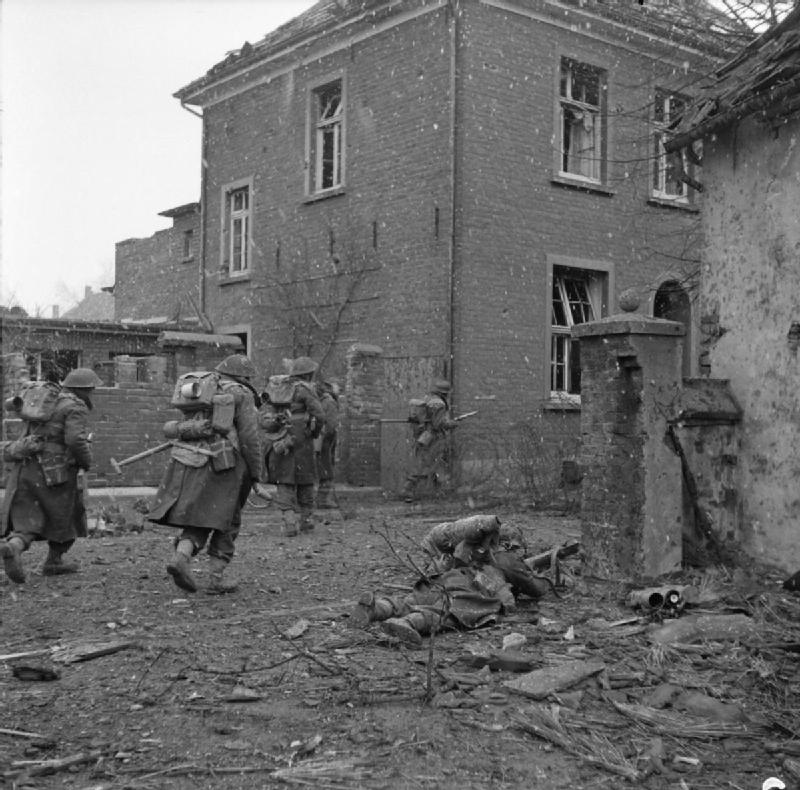
Men of the 4th Royal Welch Regiment in Weeze, 3 March 1945.

The town's development suffered a major setback during World War II when eighty percent of it was destroyed. However, through hard work, commitment, and craft skills, the citizens of Weeze managed to rebuild. Houses and buildings that were destroyed were reconstructed in the 1950s and 1960s. Town development continued and culminated in the redevelopment of the town center, which now serves as a forum for activities such as the Kirmes (carnival fair), Christmas markets, street parties, and more.

Weeze gained fame through its energetic shoemakers, whose products were distributed to Krefeld and Wuppertal. Later, the town became known for its carpentry and woodworking, as well as for hosting the Royal Air Force airbase at Laarbruch from 1954 to 1999. Today, the newly opened regional airport, "Airport Weeze," occupies the site of the former RAF airbase.

=== Coat of arms ===
The coat of arms of Weeze

The Municipality of Weeze was granted the right to carry a coat of arms by the Prussian Ministry of State on April 28, 1928. The official blazon of the coat of arms of Weeze is:

Per pale, the sinister per fess; Azure, a Saint Argent with a nimbus Or, in the right a book Or with a cross sable and in the left a palm leaf Or; sinister above Or, a dragon head sable and below Argent, a rose branch vert with five roses gules.

The saint depicted in the left half of the field is the patron saint of the town, St. Cyriacus, with a book and palm. The top right half of the field depicts a black dragon's head on a golden background (in reference to a legend of Cyriacus enchaining a dragon), and the bottom right half with a white background bears a green twig with five red roses (Geldrian roses/medlar blooms, depicting the affiliation to the former duchy of Geldern) and five leaves.

The coat of arms can be seen on the Weeze juror's (court's) crest from 1460.

== Population ==
Historical population

Year	Pop.	±% p.a.
1965	8,801	—
1970	9,075	+0.62%
1975	8,878	−0.44%
1980	8,909	+0.07%
1985	8,673	−0.54%
1990	8,570	−0.24%
1995	9,134	+1.28%

Year	Pop.	±% p.a.
2000	9,662	+1.13%
2005	10,296	+1.28%
2010	10,682	+0.74%
2015	10,611	−0.13%
2020	11,228	+1.14%
2025	12,364	+1.95%

Source: Landesdatabank Nordrhein-Westfalen

== Economy ==
The departure of almost 40% of the local population with the withdrawal of British personnel and the closure of nearby RAF Laarbruch in 1999 left Weeze's politicians and inhabitants with a major challenge. Industrial estates have been redesigned and extended so that companies have been able to expand and new companies have, as a result, chosen Weeze as a home base. The population has grown by almost 10% since the departure of RAF personnel and their families. Local politicians are targeting a future population of 12,000.

With the positive economic perspective provided by Weeze Airport, which already employs in the region of 350 locals, the municipality of Weeze is to undergo many changes in its infrastructure. Roads to and from the airport will have to be extended and improved to meet future demand. Schools and kindergartens will also have to grow in capacity for the targeted increase in population.

The municipality can be reached by road and rail: via Autobahn A 57, via the B 9 road or by rail on the Cologne-Kleve link. Due to this fact and the easy accessibility from the Rhine-Ruhr region, from Düsseldorf and Krefeld, as well as from the Netherlands, Weeze is an attractive site for commercial businesses. With recent state approval for the development of the former RAF Laarbruch airbase into a regional civilian airport with a logistical and industrial base, a projected 2,000 jobs were to be created by the year 2010.

=== Airport ===
The airport in the Municipality of Weeze was formerly home to a Royal Air Force base at RAF Laarbruch between 1954 and 1999, situated close to the village of Weeze-Wemb. Closure of the airbase in 1999 had a considerable effect on the local economy, with the loss of 400 jobs and the departure of 5,000 base personnel and dependants.

The airbase was rejuvenated by a new role as a civilian regional airport Weeze Airport (also known as Niederrhein) which saw commercial operations commence in May 2003. Situated near the city of Cleves, the new airport has been intended to enable low-cost airlines to operate efficiently. Approximately 11 million travellers, mostly Dutch and German, use the airport annually. The two-storey terminal building measures approximately 140 m × 70 m (460 ft × 230 ft) and was developed from a steel building which dated back to 1933. The large-scale glass front, granite floor and a modern interior provide for an up-to-date appearance. Parking spaces for 1,000 vehicles were built in front of the terminal.

On 3 January 2006, an administrative court suspended the airport's operating licence in response to complaints over noise. Flight operations however continue while the issue is debated in the courts.

== Politics and government ==
The municipal council of Weeze has 28 members. Since the municipal elections in 2014, the membership of the council has been:

CDU (58.7%, 16 seats);
SPD (25.1%, 7 seats)
Alliance '90 / The Greens (10.4%, 3 seats), and;
FDP (5.8%, 2 seats).

== Culture and tourism ==
The surrounding countryside draws tourists and nature lovers. Its setting on the River Niers in the northern part of the Lower Rhine Region combined with the close proximity to the Netherlands make Weeze an easily accessible town. On its way to the Meuse the Niers snakes past castles and old farmhouses. Natural and historical sights of interest are dotted throughout the municipality, making the countryside setting attractive and interesting.

=== Wissen Castle ===
Schloss Wissen is a moated castle located to south of Weeze on the B 9 trunk road. The roots of this complex date back to the 14th century. After a number of different building phases, today's castle is primarily neo-Gothic in design. The von Loe family extensively restored the castle between 1969 and 1973.

A highlight of the castle is its neo Gothic chapel which was built in 1876 and designed by the Cologne architect Vincenz Statz. An authentic servants’ settlement, the Boye, also belongs to the castle complex, where extensive buildings stemming from the past two centuries are still visible.

=== Kalbeck Castle ===
On the other side of Weeze, to the north, is the complex of Kalbeck, hardly visible from the road and situated in a large wood. This castle also has a long history, being first mentioned as a moated castle in 1326. Destroyed by fire on a number of occasions, Baron Friedrich von Vittinghoff-Schell rebuilt it in 1909 modelled on Westphalian moated castles of the 18th century. The gardens of the castle provide a backdrop for classical outdoor concerts in the summer.

=== The ruins of Hertefeld Castle ===
This historically important manor (14th century) and later Baroque castle lies to the east of Weeze in the middle of an approximately five-hectare park and is still owned by the family of zu Eulenburg und Hertefeld. The castle received extensive war damage in 1945 and of its complex only the neighbouring house from 1706 remained intact. However, the ruins of the castle were bolstered so that the remaining historical walls could host classical and theatrical events.

=== Tourism ===
The Municipality offers a wide range of outdoor activities. An almost 210 km (130 mi) network of bridle, cycling and rambling paths, partially along the Niers River, as well as recreational activities such as angling, canoeing and kart racing round off an abundance of leisure activities in and around the Municipality.

The Herrensitz-Route, a border-crossing cycling route, guides cyclists to these and many other highlights and attractions of the region, such as Kleve, home of Anne of Cleves; Kevelaer, famous for its pilgrimages, Moyland Castle between Kalkar and Bedburg-Hau, or Gennep in the Netherlands where the Meuse and Niers rivers converge. The Weeze animal park with its educational trail and children's zoo is a special attraction for families. The park is located on the edge of the town next to the ruins of Hertefeld Castle.

=== Twin towns ===
Weeze is twinned with the town of Watton, Norfolk in England.

== Facts and figures ==
Religious makeup: 72% Roman Catholic, 17% Protestant, 11% other religious denominations or non-religious

Municipal area: The Municipality encompasses Weeze, Wemb, the area of the former military airfield Laarbruch (now Weeze Airport) and 16 farmsteads.

Land cultivation: Farming 45,330 km^{2} (17,500 sq mi), woodland 19,040 km^{2} (7,350 sq mi), rest 15,080 km^{2} (5,820 sq mi)

Commercial and employment structure: 67 craftsman's guilds, 14 industrial firms, 161 trading businesses, 2 banks, 27 restaurants and pubs, 154 other businesses (insurance agents etc.)

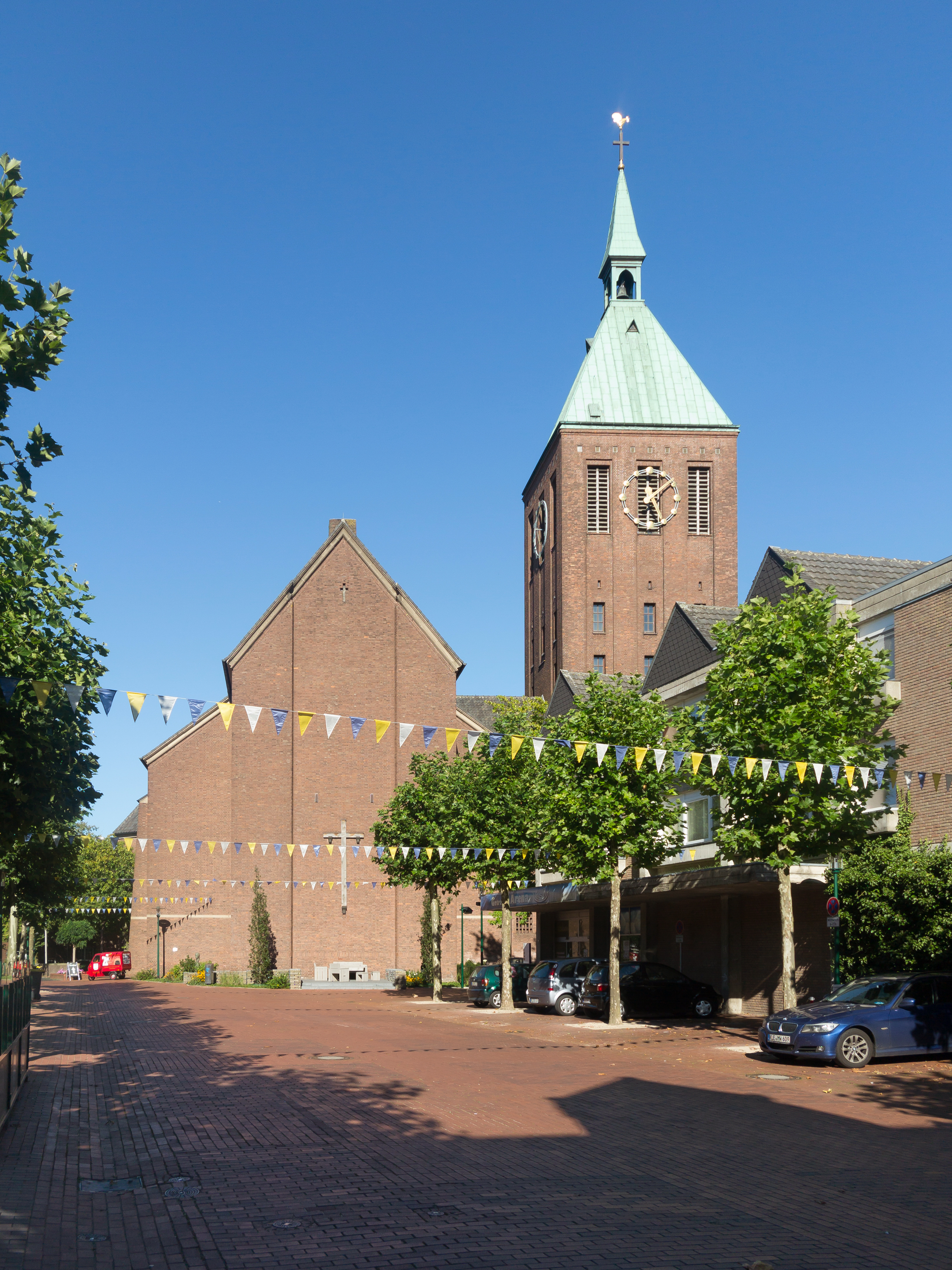
Catholic church of St. Cyriakus, Weeze

Protected buildings and natural sites of interest:

- Alte Försterei (old forester's house)
- Alte Kaplanei (old chaplain's house)
- Altenheim Clemenshaus (senior citizen's residence)
- Evgl. Pfarrkirche (Protestant church)
- Kath. Pfarrheim (Catholic vicarage)
- Kath. Pfarrkirche Heilig Kreuz (Catholic church in Wemb)
- Kath. Pfarrkirche St. Cyriakus (Catholic church in Weeze)
- Marienwasserhof (remains of the former monastery Marienwasser)
- Castle ruins and domestic building of Hertefeld Castle
- Schloss Kalbeck (Kalbeck Castle)
- Wasserburg Schloss Wissen (Wissen Castle and moat)
- Wassermühle (watermill)
- Windmühle Wemb (windmill)
- 2 Kastanien am Heishof, Kalbeck (2 chestnut trees with a circumference of 5.9 and 4 m (19 and 13 ft))
- 20 Kopfeichen am Büssenhof, Kalbeck (20 oak trees)
- Kroneiche in Vorselaer (oak tree with a circumference of 4.2 m (14 ft))
- Trüppeiche am Trüpphoff in Wissen (oak tree with a circumference of 5.8 m (19 ft))
- Zigeunereiche am evgl. Friedhof (oak tree near Protestant graveyard with a circumference of 3.8 m (12 ft))

Languages spoken German, Dutch

== People ==
- Ronald Pofalla, General-Secretary of the CDU

== See also ==
- List of windmills in North Rhine-Westphalia
- Well, Limburg#Localities
