= Botho Sigwart zu Eulenburg =

German composer and count

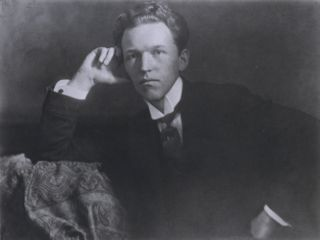
Sigwart Graf zu Eulenburg (1884–1915)

Sigwart Botho Philipp August zu Eulenburg, Count of Eulenburg (10 January 1884 – 2 June 1915) was the second son of Philipp, Prince of Eulenburg (1847–1921) and his wife Augusta, born Countess of Sandels (1853–1941) and a German late romantic composer who fell in the First World War.

== Childhood and studies ==
Prince zu Eulenburg-Hertefeld was born in Munich, but the family seat was the castle and estate of Liebenberg in the region of Brandenburg, north of Berlin. Art and music played a central role in family affairs. The prince himself played and composed music and wrote poetry and romances (the famous Rosenlieder and Scandinavian Cantos) and was a friend and confidant of Kaiser Wilhelm II, who regularly visited Liebenberg. He supported his gifted son and daughter Victoria, familiarly called Tora, who was a pianist, and they grew up in a musical environment at the castle of Liebenberg

Sigwart showed his musical talent at a young age. Already at seven he composed songs by ear and at eight years old he began music lessons in Munich and Vienna, devoting himself to musical composition and improvising at the piano, often when the emperor visited them at Liebenberg. Emperor Wilhelm even commissioned the eleven-year-old boy to compose variations on the Dessauer March, a composition for orchestra that was performed in the music salon in Vienna with Sigwart himself conducting. From 1898 he began to take lessons on the organ in Bunzlau with the city's cantor Wagner, who permitted him to select music for the church services. It was during this time that he published his first compendium of songs that he had written as a twelve-year-old, as well as a composition for orchestra that was performed in the hall of the music society in Vienna. In 1899 he left Bunzlau and returned to Liebenberg, receiving private tuition, completing his Abitur at the Friedrich-Wilhelm Gymnasium in Berlin

Eulenburg studied History and Philosophy in Munich from 1902 onward, taking courses in counterpoint with Professor Ludwig Thuille and orchestral studies with the renowned Court Kapellmeister Zumpe. His vacations were spent at home in Liebenberg or travelling to cultivate his love for nature. At the invitation of Cosima Wagner, he was able to spend one summer at the Wagner festivals in Bayreuth with access to all the performances and sometimes standing in to conduct rehearsals. He submitted his dissertation on the Rothenburg ob der Tauber composer and organist Erasmus Widmann (1572–1634), spending many months in Rothenburg until obtaining his doctorate in 1907.

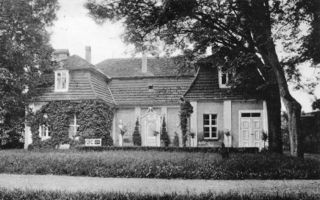
Schloss Liebenberg, Lindenhaus

== Further studies and marriage ==
Sigwart refused a post as kapellmeister in Colmar, organising a studio for himself at his home in Liebenberg where he could work in peace on his compositions. Besides this he continued with further studies under Max Reger in Leipzig. He laboured over his work on fugues, complaining to his godfather and mentor Cuno, Count of Moltke: "The fugue might be an artistic composition and one can write beautiful music by means of the fugue, but it is nevertheless true slavery for the man gifted with fantasy." Reger, his teacher, to whom he also confided this sentiment, countered, "When you have written 300 fugues, as I have, you will also be able to move freely within this form as within any other."

Apart from his diverse social life and wide circle of friends including, Wilhelm Furtwängler and Professor Arthur Nikisch, the artist continued to study the great philosophers and the different world religions. Through the family's acquaintance with Dr. Rudolf Steiner, who occasionally stayed at Liebenberg, Sigwart encountered Anthroposophy. In addition to studying the basic works of Anthroposophy, he often attended Steiner's lectures together with his sisters Lycki and Tora, his brother Karl, and his sister-in-law Marie.

In the meanwhile Sigwart had come to know the Kammersängerin Helene Staegemann (1877–1923), daughter of the Leipzig theatre director Max Staegemann and his wife, the violinist Hildegard Kirchner. Her brother was the celebrated operatic baritone and actor Waldemar Staegemann and she came from the well-known artist family Devrient. Directly after having been instructed in Voice by her father, she began her stage career in Berlin, Vienna and Prague, becoming a celebrated interpreter of song compositions with composers such as Carl Reinecke und Hans Pfitzner dedicating compositions to her. She and Sigwart were married on 21 September 1909 in Leipzig.

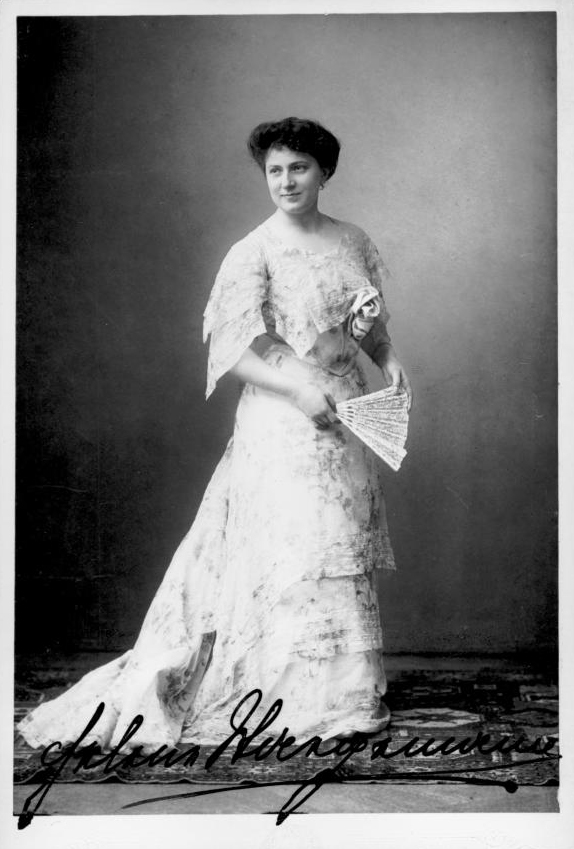
Helene Gräfin zu Eulenburg, geb. Staegemann (1877 - 1923)

The couple settled in Dresden, travelling extensively to Helene's musical engagements and occasional performances of Sigwart's compositions. He began a course of further instruction on the Organ with Albert Schweitzer, whom he sought out in Strassbourg and to whom he dedicated his composition for organ (op. 12). Then in May 1911 they undertook a journey through Greece and were deeply impressed by the holy places of antiquity. Sigwart made extensive notes in his diary, which he reworked musically on their return to Germany. His melodrama for orchestra The Funeral of Hector, with words taken from the Iliad (op. 15) was performed with considerable success in Leipzig and Dresden and led to a commission by the conductor and director of the Leipzig Conservatory, Arthur Nikisch (1855–1922), for a symphony for orchestra. For several years, however, Sigwart had been thinking about composing an opera. Having been alerted to the texts of Euripides by his early music teacher, Count Sporck, Sigwart withdrew for a period in 1912 and 1913 to his family residence Hertefeld Castle by the Rhine to work on it in solitude. The Songs of Euripides, as it was called, was accepted as a work in the spring of 1913 by the Staatstheater Stuttgart. After a labour of one and a half years, it was to be the only opera he composed, its completion coinciding with the birth of his only son Friedrich Max Donatus Sigwart on 19 February 1914.

== Battle and fall on the Eastern Front ==
A few months later Sigwart volunteered for active service first in Flanders and France, where he still managed to complete his Sonata for Piano, the Kreigssonate (op. 19) and thereafter in Galicia, where his regiment was transferred in April 1915. By now a lieutenant and bearer of the Iron Cross, he was wounded by a shot that pierced his lung. He was no longer able to experience the highly acclaimed premier of his opera at the Staatstheater in Stuttgart, succumbing to his wound on 2 June 1915 in a field hospital in Jasło. He lies buried on the estate of Liebenberg. His widow survived him by eight years, his son Friedrich, also a brilliant young musician, was accidentally killed in 1936 during a reserve duty training exercise at the age of 22.

== Post-mortem communications ==
Between 1970 and 1972 three volumes of communications between Sigwart, his sisters Lycky and Tora and sister-in-law Marie appeared in publication under the title Brücke über den Strom, published in English as Bridge over the River. They contain notes of the three women of messages he transmitted to them over the following years describing his experiences on the other side of the so-called threshold of death. On first receiving these communications, the recipients sought out Rudolf Steiner to question him as to their authenticity. He advised them to take careful notes and these they made available to be published many years later. The relationship to Anthroposophy continued in the family subsequently and Sigwart's older brother, the later Prince Friedrich Wend zu Eulenburg was one of the influential signatories to the petition to release the priests of the Christian Community, who had been interned by the Gestapo in 1941.

A foundation "Förderkreis Botho Sigwart e.V." based at the Castle Hertefeld today promotes the musical work and awareness of Botho Sigwart zu Eulenburg

== List of musical works ==
- op. 1 Vier Lieder mit Lautenbegleitung, Heft 1 (Hrsg. teilweise in: Kunstwart 2/3 1917) (Four Songs Accompanied by the Lute Book 1)
- op. 2 Vier Lieder mit Lautenbegleitung, Heft 1 (Four Songs Accompanied by the Lute Book 2)
- op. 3 Vier Lieder mit Lautenbegleitung, Heft 3 (Four Songs Accompanied by the Lute Book 3)
- op. 4 Fünf Lieder für hohe Stimme mit Klavierbegleitung (Five Songs For High Voice Voice with Piano Accompaniment)
- op. 5 Drei Lieder für tiefe Stimme mit Klavierbegleitung (Three Songs For Deep Voice with Piano Accompaniment)
- op. 6 Sonate (E-dur) für Violine und Klavier (Sonata in E-maj for Violin and Piano)
- op. 7 Vier Lieder für hohe Stimme mit Klavierbegleitung. (Verlag Bote & Bock, Berlin) (Four for High Voice with Piano Accompaniment)
- op. 8 Marienlieder. (Verlag Jonas-Eckermann, Berlin) (Songs to Mary)
- op. 9 Vier Lieder für Sopran mit Klavierbegleitung (Four Songs For Soprano with Piano Accompaniment)
- op. 10 Drei gemischte Chöre zu Dichtungen von Hölderlin (Three Songs for Mixed Choir to Poems by Hölderlin)
- op. 11 Melodien aus der Jenaer Liederhandschrift (Melodies From the Jena Song Manuscript)
- op. 12 Symphonie (C-Dur) für Orgel und Orchester (gewidmet Albert Schweitzer) (Symphony in C-Maj for Organ and Orchestra) (dedicated to Albert Schweitzer)
- op. 13 Streichquartett (H-Dur) (String Quartet in B-Maj) ASIN: B00003L3LY
- op. 14 Klaviersonate (A-Dur) (Weihnachtssonate) für Klavier (2. Satz hrsg. Kunstwart 12/2 1916) (Sonata for Piano in A-Maj - Christmas Sonata)
- op. 15 Hectors Bestattung (aus Homers Ilias) mit begleitender Musik für Orchester (Hector's Funeral from Homer's Iliad with orchestral accompaniment)
- op. 16 Sonate (Es-dur) für Viola dÀmore und Klavier (Sonata in E-flat-Maj vor Viola d'amore and Piano)
- op. 17 Vier Lieder für Sopran mit Klavierbegleitung, Text von Karl Woermann (Four Songs for Soprano and Piano to texts of Karl Woermann)
- op. 18 Ode an die Sappho von Grillparzer mit begleitender Musik für Klavier, Melodrama (Ode to Sappho of Grillparzer with accompaniment for Piano)
- op. 19 Sonate (D-Dur) (Kriegssonate) für Klavier ASIN: B00003L3LY (Sonata in D-Maj "War Sonata" for Piano)
- op. 20 Die Lieder des Euripides. Eine Mär aus Alt-Hellas nach Texten von Ernst von Wildenbruch. Oper (Kommissionsverlag: M. Brockhaus, Leipzig). (UA: Königliches Hoftheater Stuttgart 1915) (The Songs of Euripides. A tale from Ancient Hellas with texts by Ernst von Wildenbruch - Opera)

== CD and DVD ==
- Botho Sigwart Edition vol. II op. 13, 0p. 19 (CD im Pink Tonträger Verlag, D- 7219 Staufen, 1999)
- Botho Sigwart zu Eulenburg: op. 6, op. 7, op. 14, op. 18 (CD im Parzival Verlag, CH - 4143 Dornach, 1994)

== Literature ==
- Eine Erinnerung: Meine Erinnerungen an Sigwart Graf zu Eulenburg Cuno Graf zu Moltke, Volume 2, 1918
- Emil Hollack: Sigwart Graf zu Eulenburg. Eine Erinnerung. Als Handschrift gedruckt. Teil I. Im Selbstverlag, Liebenberg 1918
- Emil Hollack: Sigwart Graf zu Eulenburg. Eine Erinnerung. Als Handschrift gedruckt. Teil II. Im Selbstverlag, Liebenberg 1918
- Sigwart Graf zu Eulenburg: Erasmus Widmann. Leben und Werk. Dissertation 1907 Nabu Press February 2012 ISBN 978-1276397643
- Brücke über den Strom Oratio Verlag; Auflage: 6., Aufl. (29. April 2009) ISBN 978-3721405514
- The Bridge over the River Translated by Joseph Wetzel Steiner Books 1974, Incorporated ISBN 9780910142595
